= Rog (disambiguation) =

Rog is a 2005 Hindi film.

Rog, rog, or ROG may also refer to:

== People ==
- Ronan O'Gara (born 1977), an Irish rugby union coach and former player
- Rog Phillips, an American science fiction writer Roger Phillips Graham (1909-1965)
- Michel Rog (born 1973), a Dutch politician and trade union leader
- Marko Rog (born 1995), a Croatian footballer

== Places ==
- Rog, Albania, a village in Berat County
- Róg, Pomeranian Voivodeship, Poland, a settlement
- Róg, Warmian-Masurian Voivodeship, Poland, a village
- Rog, Kočevje, a former settlement in the Municipality of Kočevje, Slovenia
- Kočevski Rog or simply Rog, a plateau in Slovenia
- Loch Ròg, a loch on the west coast of Lewis, Outer Hebrides

== Transportation ==
- Rail Operations Group, British railway company
- Róg railway station, Pomeranian Voivodeship, Poland
- Rogart railway station, Scotland (code: ROG)
- Rogers Municipal Airport, Arkansas, United States (IATA, FAA code: ROG)

== Other uses ==
- Rog (factory), a former bicycle factory, now a squat, in Ljubljana, Slovenia
- Reactive organic gases
- Republic of Gamers, an Asus line of gaming PC enthusiast components
  - ROG Phone, an Asus gaming enthusiast smartphone
- Roog or Rog, the supreme deity in the Serer religion
- Royal Observatory, Greenwich, London
- The Northern dialect of the Roglai language of Vietnam (ISO 639-3: rog)

== See also ==
- Roog (disambiguation)
- Roger
- Republic of Ghana
- Republic of Guinea
- German Republic (disambiguation)
