= Górzyn, Lower Silesian Voivodeship =

Górzyn
- Village
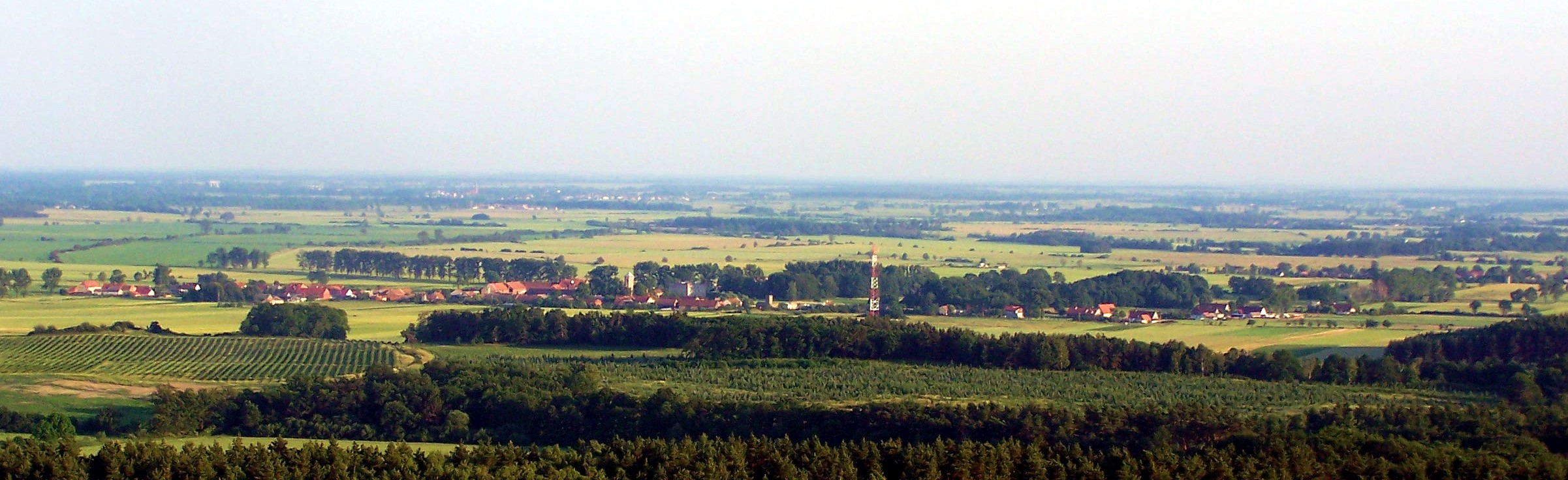
- View over Górzyn from nearby forest tower

- Location within Poland
- Coordinates: 51°30′08″N 16°23′47″E
- Country: Poland
- Voivodeship: Lower Silesian
- County: Lubin
- Gmina: Rudna
- Elevation: 108 m (354 ft)
- Population: approx. 400
- Time zone: UTC+1 (CET)
  - Summer (DST): UTC+2 (CEST)
- Vehicle registration: DLU

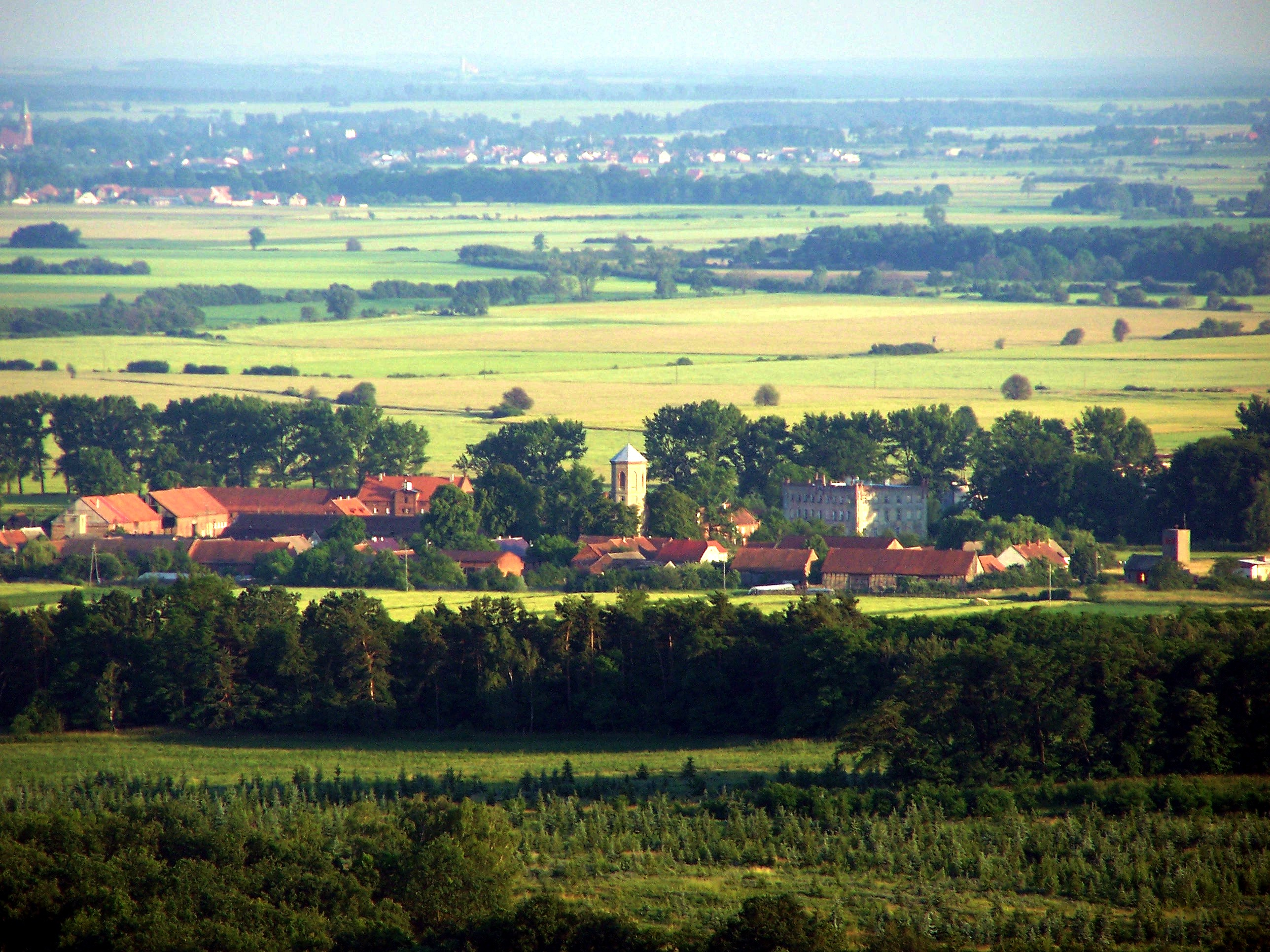
Central part of the village

Górzyn [ˈɡuʐɨn] is a village in the administrative district of Gmina Rudna, within Lubin County, Lower Silesian Voivodeship, in south-western Poland. Geographically it is located within Wzgórza Dalkowskie Hills and Obniżenie Ścinawskie which are parts of hills massif Wał Trzebnicki hills formed after glaciation (average height of approx. 100 metres (328 ft)).

== History ==
It was first mentioned in 1267. But most probably the settlement here was present much longer which may be indicated by kurgans and Slavic settlement (inhabited by Dziadoszyce tribe) near the village. In 1945 war front was moving along the village connected with heavy fights i.e. still visible in local findings such as duds.

== Present state ==
Górzyn has connections with neighbouring villages (Naroczyce, Olszany, Ciechłowice, Miłogoszcz) and moreover field roads which are still in common use like road to Kliszów which is considered locally important. In Górzyn there is a volunteer firefighter station.

Within village several relics are located including many buildings constructed before 1900. The most valuable are the Church of st. Michael (15th century), palace (19th century), school (nowadays changed to housing functions) and the old forge. As a smaller relics one may find conciliation cross from 14th-16th century. In the village there are also remnants of a manor park formed mostly from large horse-chestnuts. In the northern part there is also a small abandoned evangelic cemetery.

In the first half of 19th century there were brewery and distillery, also connected with local vineyards. On the way to Naroczyce there were three windmills and on the way to Ciechłowice during World War II there was a military airport which remnants are still visible.

== Sports ==
Górzyn had own football team LZS Burza Górzyn which is not active nowadays.
