= Róg =

Róg may refer to:

- Róg, Pomeranian Voivodeship, Poland
  - Róg railway station
- Róg, Warmian-Masurian Voivodeship, Poland
- Róg Orłowski, Warmian-Masurian Voivodeship, Poland
- Róg Osada, Pomeranian Voivodeship, Poland
- Czarny Róg, Ostróda County, Warmian-Masurian Voivodeship, Poland
- Czarny Róg, Pisz County, Warmian-Masurian Voivodeship, Poland
- Jałowy Róg, Podlaskie Voivodeship, Poland
- Jeleni Róg, Pomeranian Voivodeship, Poland
- Kozi Róg, Kuyavian-Pomeranian Voivodeship, Poland
- Krzywy Róg, Warmian-Masurian Voivodeship, Poland
- Niedźwiedzi Róg, Warmian-Masurian Voivodeship, Poland
- Ostry Róg, Warmian-Masurian Voivodeship, Poland
- Suchy Róg, Warmian-Masurian Voivodeship, Poland
- Twardy Róg, Podlaskie Voivodeship, Poland
- Żabi Róg, Warmian-Masurian Voivodeship, Poland.
