= Kostki =

Kostki may refer to the following villages:

- Kostki, Masovian Voivodeship (eastern Poland)
- Kostki, Pomeranian Voivodeship (northern Poland)
- Kostki, Warmian-Masurian Voivodeship (northern Poland)
