= Koźlice =

Koźlice may refer to the following places, all in Lower Silesian Voivodeship in southwest Poland:

- Koźlice, Lubin County in Gmina Rudna, Lubin County
- Koźlice, Polkowice County in Gmina Gaworzyce, Polkowice County
- Koźlice, Zgorzelec County in Gmina Zgorzelec, Zgorzelec County
- Koźlice, Pomeranian Voivodeship (north Poland)
