= Rudna, Lower Silesian Voivodeship =

Rudna
- Village
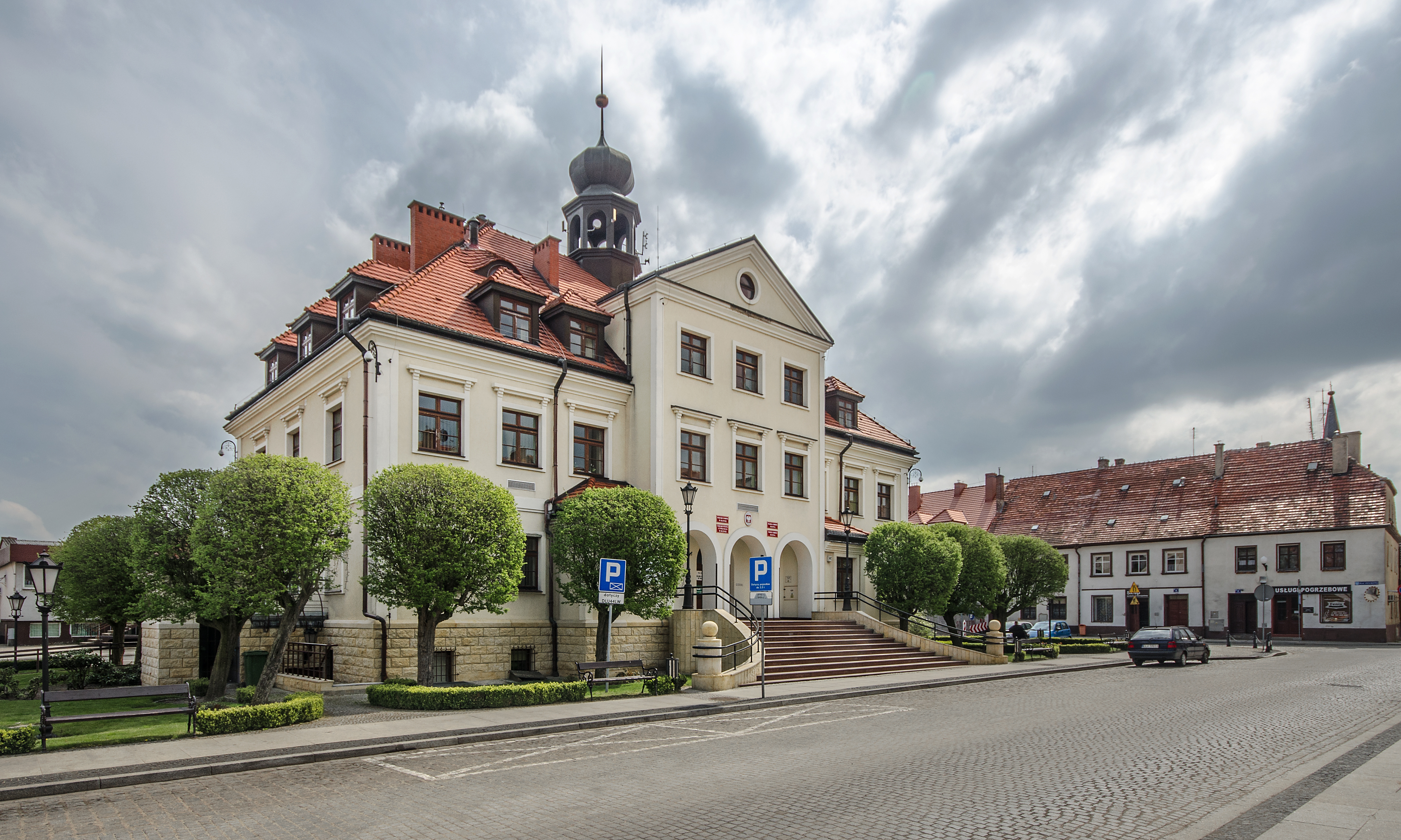
- Town hall

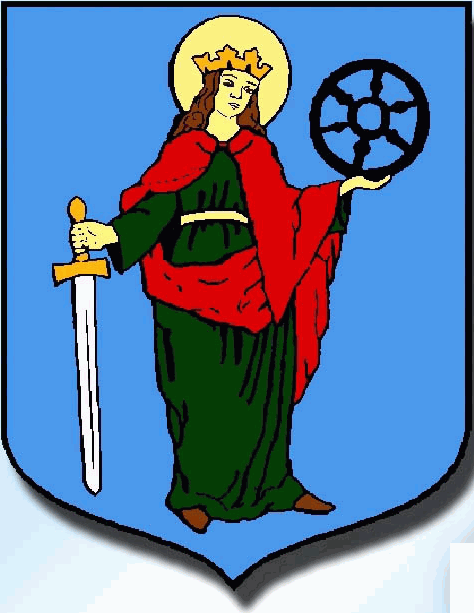
- Coat of arms

- Location within Poland
- Coordinates: 51°30′40″N 16°15′48″E
- Country: Poland
- Voivodeship: Lower Silesian
- County: Lubin
- Gmina: Rudna

Population
  - Total: 1,300
- Time zone: UTC+1 (CET)
  - Summer (DST): UTC+2 (CEST)
- Vehicle registration: DLU

Rudna [ˈrudna] is a village in Lubin County, Lower Silesian Voivodeship, in south-western Poland. It is the seat of the administrative district (gmina) called Gmina Rudna.

== History ==
The village was originally called Nowa Ruda (New Rudna) - Old Polish ruda meaning ore – to distinguish it from the neighbouring small village of Stara Rudna (Old Rudna). Originated about 1280, it was not mentioned before 1347 in a deed of King Charles IV of Bohemia, as a town within the Piast-ruled Duchy of Ścinawa. In 1527, Duke Frederick II of Legnica established a local fair. The town was hit by an epidemic in 1631 and 1633, and was invaded by Sweden in 1642 and 1644, and Russia in 1758.

After World War II, the village lost its town rights and became part of the now-defunct Legnica Voivodeship.

== Notable residents ==
- Hymn-writer Johann Heermann (1585-1647)
- Heinz-Gerhard Vogt (1911–1945), Luftwaffe fighter ace
