= Gerhard Vogt =

Gerhard Vogt may refer to:

- Heinz-Gerhard Vogt, German Luftwaffe military aviator and fighter ace
- Gerhard Vogt (motorcyclist)
- Gerhard Vogt (footballer)
