= Gorzyn =

Gorzyn may refer to the following places in Poland:

- Gorzyń, Greater Poland Voivodeship
- Górzyn, Lower Silesian Voivodeship
- Górzyn, Lubusz Voivodeship
