= Studzionki =

Studzionki may refer to the following places in Poland:

- Studzionki in Gmina Rudna, Lubin County, Lower Silesian Voivodeship (SW Poland)
- Studzionki (Gorce), a hamlet in Pasmo Lubania, Gorce Mountains, Southern Poland
