= Studzienice railway station =

Railway station in Poland

Studzienice

General information
- Location: Studzienice; Poland
- Coordinates: 54.1°N 17.6°E
- Owner: Polskie Koleje Państwowe S.A.

Construction
- Structure type: Building: No; Depot: No; Water tower: No

History
- Former names: Stüdnitz until 1945
Location

Studzienice is a non-operational PKP railway station in Studzienice (Pomeranian Voivodeship), Poland.

== Lines crossing the station ==
Start station	End station	Line type
Lipusz	Korzybie	Freight
