= Orsk (disambiguation) =

Orsk is a city in Orenburg Oblast, Russia.

Orsk may also refer to:

- Orsk Airport, serving the city of Orsk
- Orsk Urban Okrug, the municipal division containing the city of Orsk
- Orsk constituency, Russian legislative constituency in Orenburg Oblast
- Orsk, Lower Silesian Voivodeship, a village in southwest Poland
- Russian landing ship Orsk, a Tapir-class landing ship of Russia
