= Osława Dąbrowa railway station =

Railway station in Osława Dąbrowa, Poland

Osława Dąbrowa

General information
- Location: Osława Dąbrowa; Poland
- Coordinates: 54.1°N 17.6°E
- Owner: Polskie Koleje Państwowe S.A.

Construction
- Structure type: Building: No; Depot: No; Water tower: No

History
- Former names: Rudolfswalde until 1945
Location
- Location within Pomeranian Voivodeship Location within Poland

Osława Dąbrowa is a non-operational PKP railway station in Osława Dąbrowa (Pomeranian Voivodeship), Poland.

== Lines crossing the station ==
Start station	End station	Line type
Lipusz	Korzybie	Freight
