= Gaffron Castle =

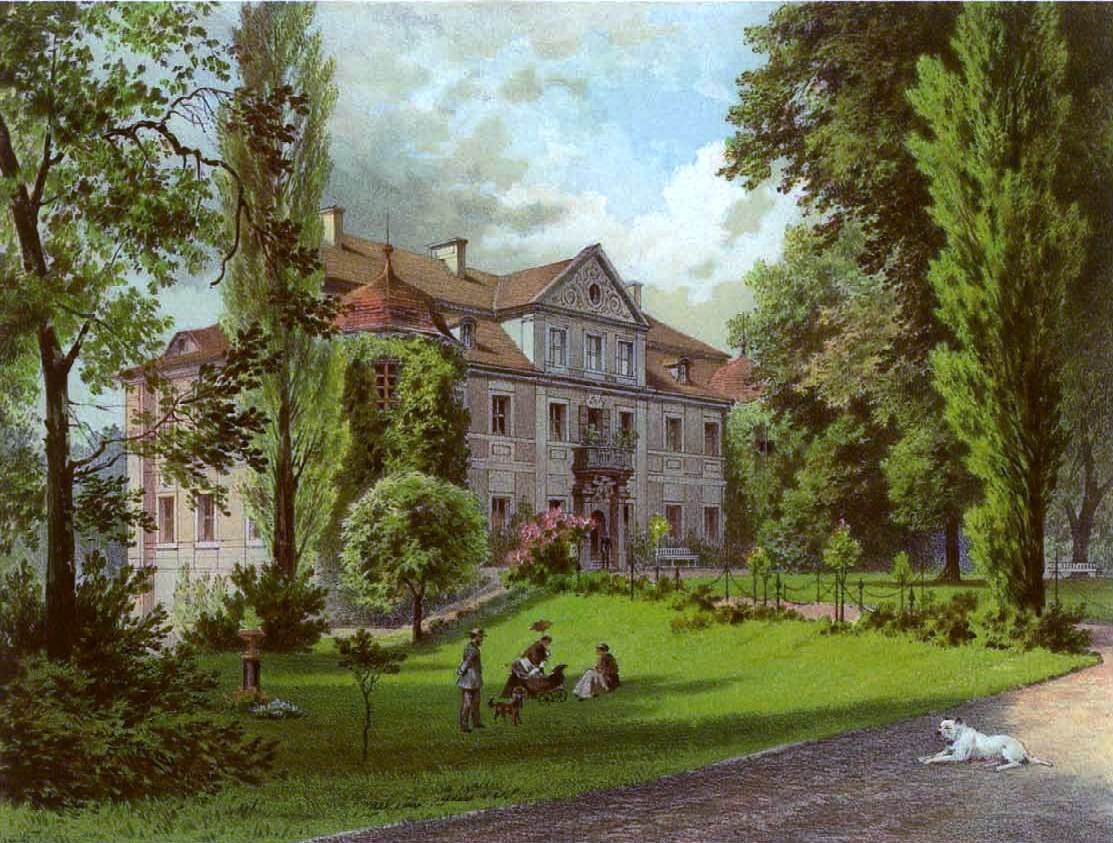
The castle Gaffron

Gaffron Castle is an old castle in Lower Silesian Voivodeship, Poland. It was a part of the former German Silesian knight holding, which consisted of the three knights' estates Groß Gaffron (Gawrony), Klein Gaffron (Gawronki) and Beitkau (Bytków). Together the property covered about 4000 hectares (2000 hectares of arable land, 1400 hectares of forest and 600 ha of water and other land).

Castles Gaffron came to pass to the von Niebeischitz, von Schweinichen - who built the present castle. From 1780 to 1834 belonged to Count von Gaffron Schönaich-Carolatb, then jointly by the Medicine Council Ebers and Captain / Hauptmann von Loeper. The year 1867 came Gaffron to belong Conrad Freiherr von der Reck.

From 1937 until the end of World War II the whole of the property including the castle was owned by Josef Veltjens and his wife Leni. The castle was damaged during the fighting in 1945, and, according to statements by locals, was later demolished to provide building materials for the city of Breslau (Wroclaw).
