= Lubieniec =

Lubieniec may refer to the following places in Poland:

- Lubieniec, Kuyavian-Pomeranian Voivodeship (north-central Poland)
- Lubieniec, Lublin Voivodeship (east Poland)
- Łubieniec, Pomeranian Voivodeship (north Poland)
