= Ugoszcz railway station =

Railway station in Poland

Ugoszcz

General information
- Location: Ugoszcz; Poland
- Coordinates: 54.126471°N 17.541008°E
- Owner: Polskie Koleje Państwowe S.A.

Construction
- Structure type: Building: No; Depot: No; Water tower: No

History
- Former names: Bernsdorf (Kr. Bütow) until 1945
Location

Ugoszcz is a non-operational PKP railway station in Ugoszcz (Pomeranian Voivodeship), Poland.

== Lines crossing the station ==
Start station	End station	Line type
Lipusz	Korzybie	Freight
