= Rynarcice, Lower Silesian Voivodeship =

Rynarcice
- Village
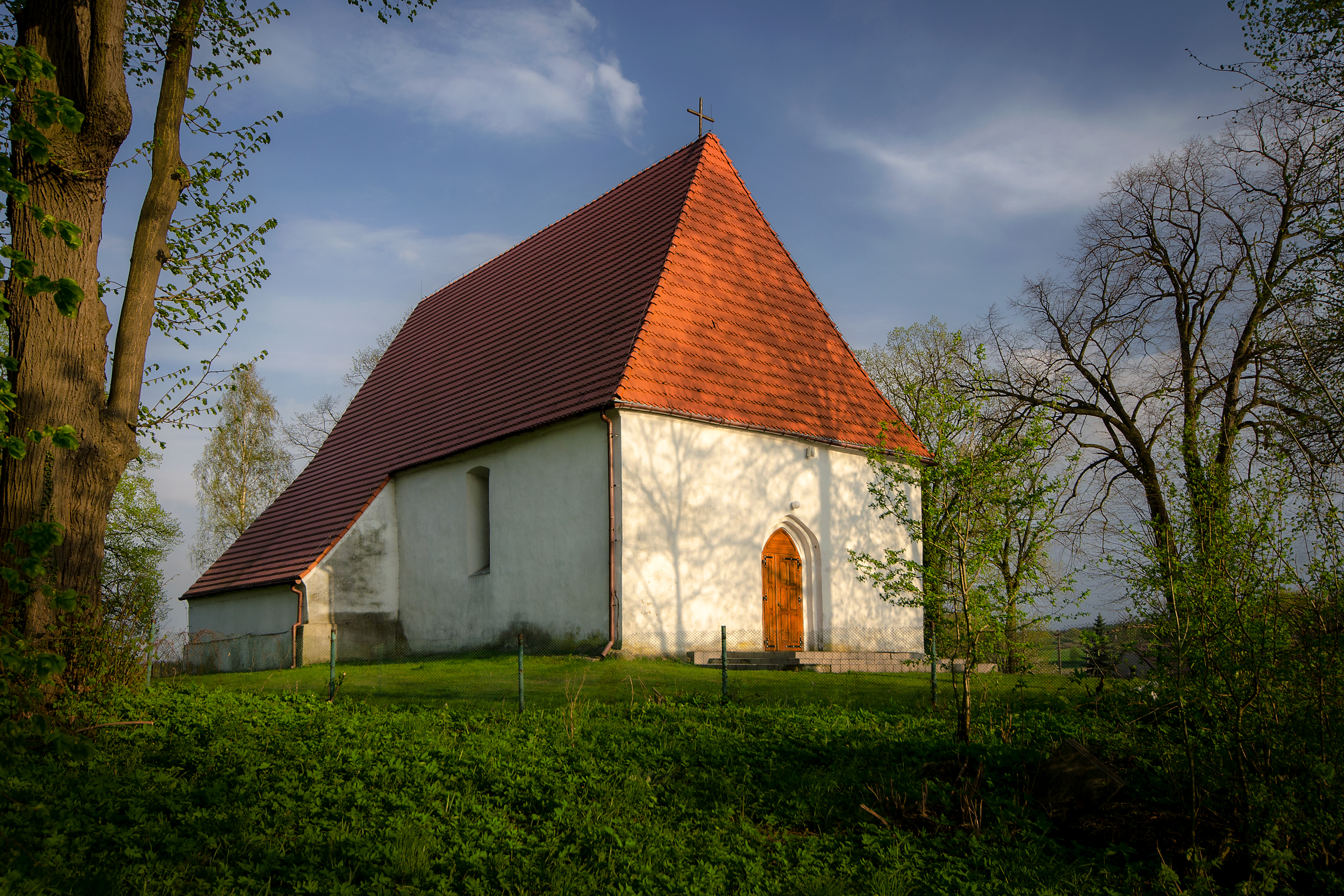
- Saint Martin church in Rynarcice

- Location within Poland
- Coordinates: 51°28′26″N 16°12′51″E
- Country: Poland
- Voivodeship: Lower Silesian
- County: Lubin
- Gmina: Rudna

Rynarcice [rɨnarˈt͡ɕit͡sɛ] (de:Groß Rinnersdorf) is a village in the administrative district of Gmina Rudna, within Lubin County, Lower Silesian Voivodeship, in south-western Poland.

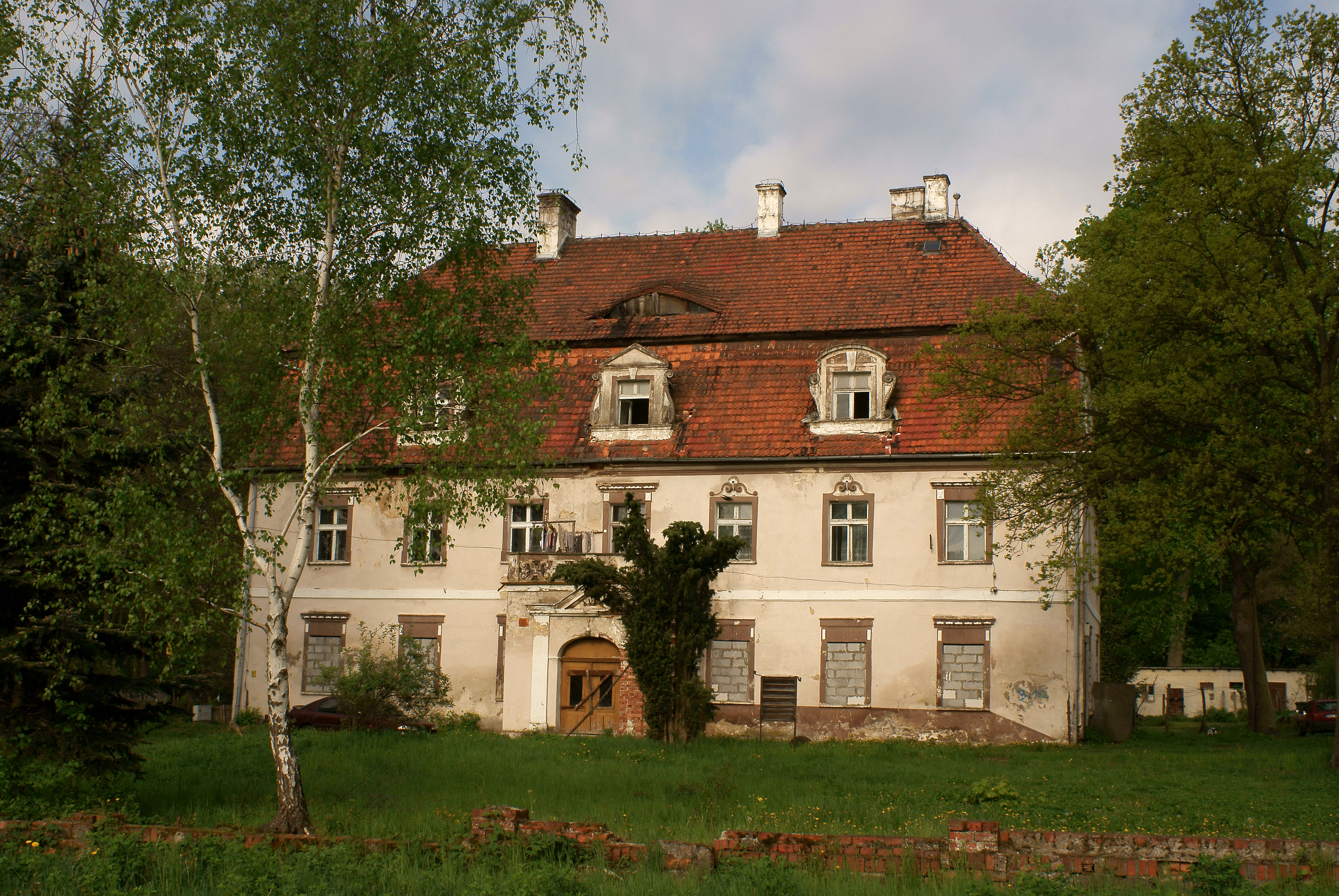
Palace Groß Rinnersdorf

== People ==
- Otto von Schlieben (1875-1932), German politician and minister for finance
