= Wądroże =

- Village
- Location within Poland
- Coordinates: 51°30′N 16°20′E
- Country: Poland
- Voivodeship: Lower Silesian
- County: Lubin
- Gmina: Rudna
- Population: 140

Wądroże [vɔnˈdrɔʐɛ] is a village in the administrative district of Gmina Rudna, within Lubin County, Lower Silesian Voivodeship, in south-western Poland.
