= Otto von Schlieben =

German politician and jurist (1875–1932)

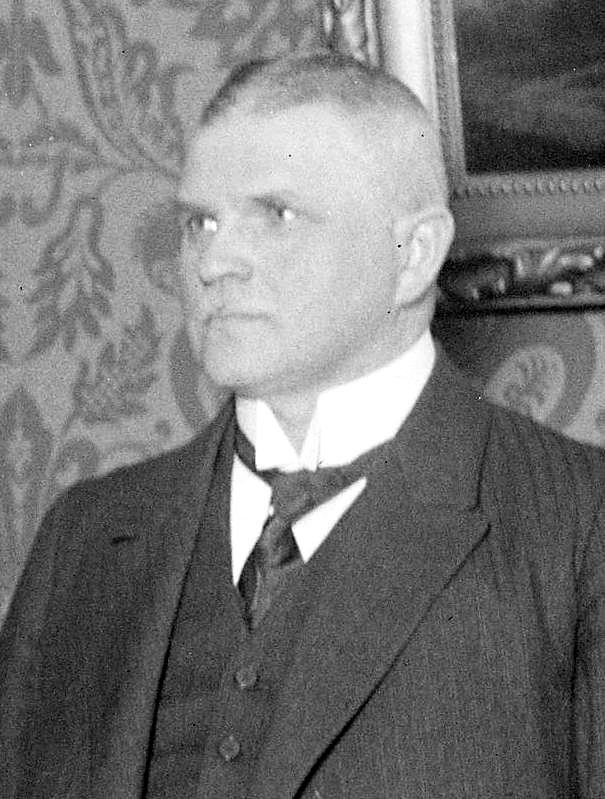
In '25

Otto von Schlieben was a German politician (14 January 1875 in Groß Rinnersdorf (Silesia) - 22 July 1932 in Halle) of the German Conservative Party and later the German National People's Party. From 15 January to 26 October 1925, he served as the Reich minister of Finances.

== Biography ==
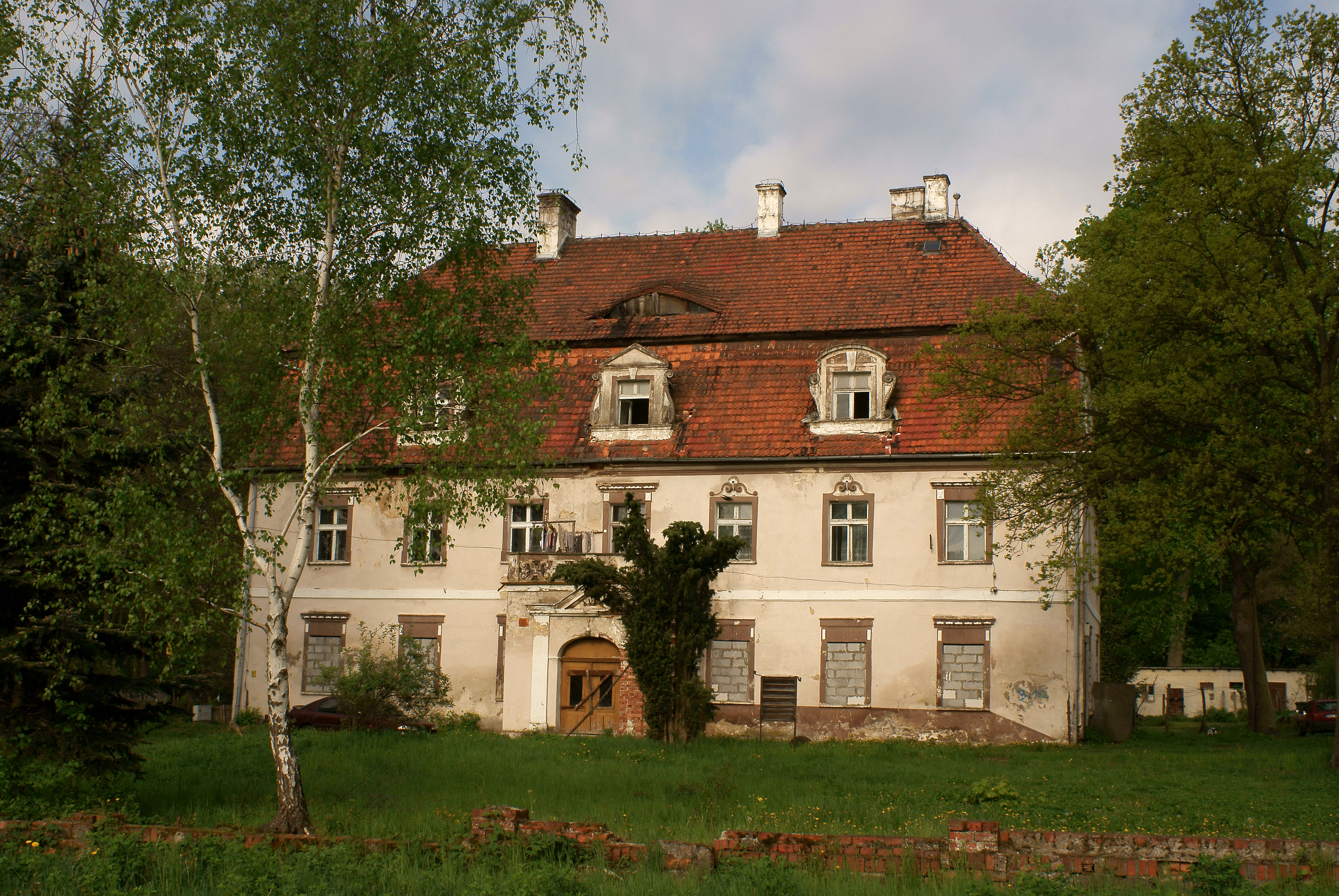
Palace Groß Rinnersdorf

He was son of nobleman Otto von Schlieben (1828–1896) and his wife Agnes von Schweinitz (1839–1915). From 1910 to 1915, von Schlieben was governor of the district of Heilsberg. He passed away at 57 in Halle and was buried in the Zehlendorf, Berlin. Sa gravestone is well-conserved.
