= Gmina Rudna =

Gmina Rudna Rudna Commune
- Gmina
- Coat of arms
- Interactive map of Gmina Rudna
- Coordinates (Rudna): 51°30′40″N 16°15′48″E
- Country: Poland
- Voivodeship: Lower Silesian
- County: Lubin
- Seat: Rudna
- Sołectwos: Brodów, Brodowice, Bytków, Chełm, Chobienia, Ciechłowice, Gawronki, Gawrony, Górzyn, Gwizdanów, Juszowice, Kębłów, Kliszów, Koźlice, Miłogoszcz, Mleczno, Naroczyce, Nieszczyce, Olszany, Orsk, Radomiłów, Radoszyce, Rudna, Rudna-Leśna, Rynarcice, Stara Rudna, Studzionki, Toszowice, Wądroże, Wysokie

Area
  - Total: 216.6 km^{2} (83.6 sq mi)

Population (2019-06-30)
  - Total: 7,793
  - Density: 35.98/km^{2} (93.18/sq mi)
- Website: http://www.rudna.pl

Gmina Rudna is a rural gmina (administrative district) in Lubin County, Lower Silesian Voivodeship, in south-western Poland. Its seat is the village of Rudna, which lies approximately 14 kilometres (9 mi) north of Lubin and 69 km (43 mi) north-west of the regional capital Wrocław.

The gmina covers an area of 216.6 square kilometres (83.6 sq mi), and as of 2019 its total population was 7,793.

== Neighbouring gminas ==
Gmina Rudna is bordered by the gminas of Grębocice, Jemielno, Lubin, Niechlów, Pęcław, Polkowice, Ścinawa and Wińsko.

== Villages ==
The gmina contains the villages of Brodów, Brodowice, Bytków, Chełm, Chobienia, Ciechłowice, Gawronki, Gawrony, Górzyn, Gwizdanów, Juszowice, Kębłów, Kliszów, Koźlice, Miłogoszcz, Mleczno, Naroczyce, Nieszczyce, Olszany, Orsk, Radomiłów, Radoszyce, Rudna, Rudna-Leśna, Rynarcice, Stara Rudna, Studzionki, Toszowice, Wądroże and Wysokie.

== Twin towns – sister cities ==
Gmina Rudna is twinned with:

- Oybin, Germany
