= Skwierawy =

- Village
- Location within Poland
- Coordinates: 54°7′N 17°42′E
- Country: Poland
- Voivodeship: Pomeranian
- County: Bytów
- Gmina: Studzienice
- Population: 175

Skwierawy [skfjɛˈravɨ] (Kashubian: Skwirawë) is a village in Gmina Studzienice, Bytów County, Pomeranian Voivodeship, in northern Poland.

From 1975 to 1998 the village was in Słupsk Voivodeship.

== Transport ==
Skwierawy lies on national road number 20.
