= Łąkie, Gmina Studzienice =

Łąkie
- Village
- Location within Poland
- Coordinates: 54°09′06″N 17°36′10″E
- Country: Poland
- Voivodeship: Pomeranian
- County: Bytów
- Gmina: Studzienice
- Elevation: 170 m (560 ft)
- Population: 22

Łąkie [ˈwɔnkʲɛ] is a village in Gmina Studzienice, Bytów County, Pomeranian Voivodeship, in northern Poland.

From 1975 to 1998 the village was in Słupsk Voivodeship.
