= Gawronki, Lower Silesian Voivodeship =

Gawronki
- Village
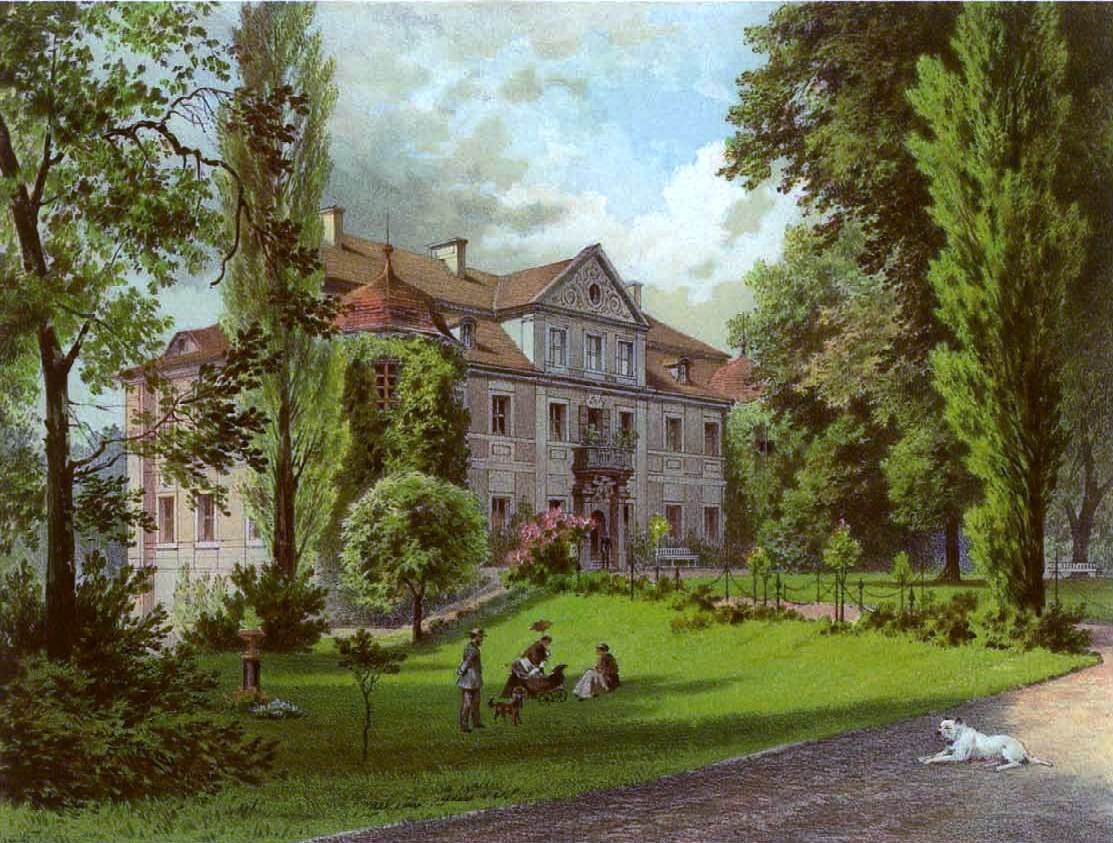

- Location within Poland
- Coordinates: 51°33′01″N 16°16′41″E
- Country: Poland
- Voivodeship: Lower Silesian
- County: Lubin
- Gmina: Rudna
- Time zone: UTC+1 (CET)
  - Summer (DST): UTC+2 (CEST)
- Vehicle registration: DLU

Gawronki [ɡaˈvrɔnki] is a village in the administrative district of Gmina Rudna, within Lubin County, Lower Silesian Voivodeship, in south-western Poland.

Gawrony Castle is located nearby.
