= Radomiłów =

- Village
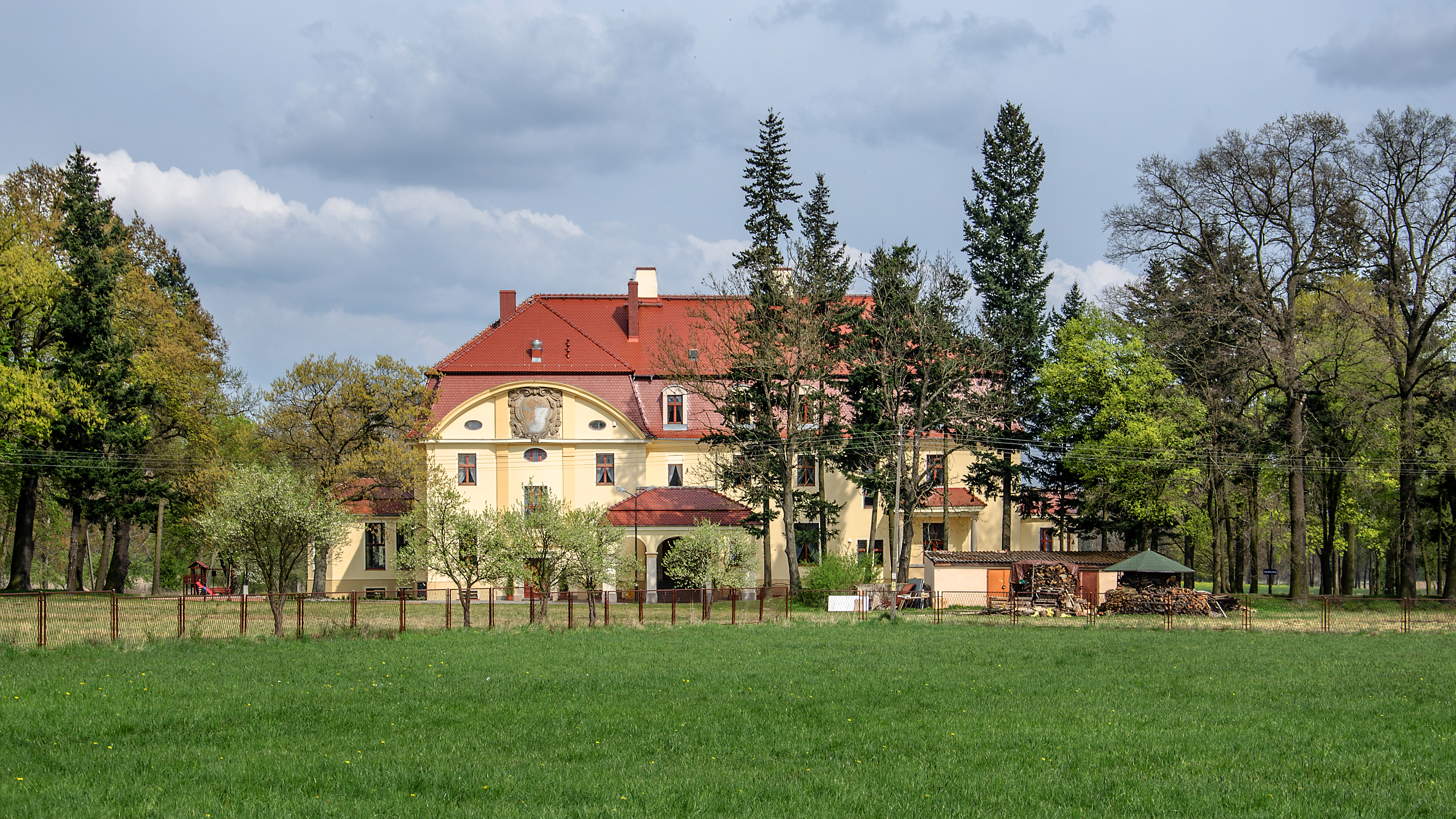
- house found in Radomiłów village

- Location within Poland
- Coordinates: 51°30′25″N 16°21′08″E
- Country: Poland
- Voivodeship: Lower Silesian
- County: Lubin
- Gmina: Rudna

Radomiłów [radɔˈmiwuf] is a village in the administrative district of Gmina Rudna, within Lubin County, Lower Silesian Voivodeship, in south-western Poland.
