= Gmina Studzienice =

Gmina Studzienice Studzienice Commune
- Gmina
- Flag Coat of arms
- Interactive map of Gmina Studzienice
- Coordinates (Studzienice): 54°5′31″N 17°34′27″E
- Country: Poland
- Voivodeship: Pomeranian
- County: Bytów
- Seat: Studzienice

Area
  - Total: 175.96 km^{2} (67.94 sq mi)

Population (2006)
  - Total: 3,408
  - Density: 19.37/km^{2} (50.16/sq mi)
- Website: http://www.studzienice.pl

Gmina Studzienice is a rural gmina (administrative district) in Bytów County, Pomeranian Voivodeship, in northern Poland. Its seat is the village of Studzienice, which lies approximately 7 kilometres (4 mi) south-east of Bytów and 76 km (47 mi) south-west of the regional capital Gdańsk. The gmina covers an area of 175.96 square kilometres (67.9 sq mi), and as of 2006 its total population is 3,408.

== Villages ==
Gmina Studzienice contains the villages and settlements of Bielawy, Błotowo, Bukówki, Cechyny, Chabzewo, Czarna Dąbrowa, Dzierżążnik, Fiszewo, Imieni, Jabłończ Wielka, Kamionka, Kłączno, Kostki, Koźlice, Łąkie, Lipuszki, Łubieniec, Małe, Ociaskowo, Okuny, Osława Dąbrowa, Osowo Małe, Półczenko, Półczno, Prądzonka, Przewóz, Rabacino, Róg, Róg Osada, Rynszt, Skwierawy, Sominki, Sominy, Studzienice, Ugoszcz and Widno.

== Neighbouring gminas ==
Gmina Studzienice is bordered by the gminas of Brusy, Bytów, Dziemiany, Lipnica, Lipusz and Parchowo.
