= Błotowo =

- Settlement
- Location within Poland
- Coordinates: 54°5′46″N 17°41′21″E
- Country: Poland
- Voivodeship: Pomeranian
- County: Bytów
- Gmina: Studzienice

Błotowo [bwɔˈtɔvɔ] is a settlement in the administrative district of Gmina Studzienice, within Bytów County, Pomeranian Voivodeship, in northern Poland.

For details of the history of the region, see History of Pomerania.
