= Przewóz, Bytów County =

Przewóz
- Village
- Location within Poland
- Coordinates: 54°03′51″N 17°32′51″E
- Country: Poland
- Voivodeship: Pomeranian
- County: Bytów
- Gmina: Studzienice
- Population: 215

Przewóz [ˈpʂɛvus] is a village in Gmina Studzienice, Bytów County, Pomeranian Voivodeship, in northern Poland.

From 1975 to 1998 the village was in Słupsk Voivodeship.
