= Rynszt =

- Settlement
- Location within Poland
- Coordinates: 54°2′58″N 17°31′18″E
- Country: Poland
- Voivodeship: Pomeranian
- County: Bytów
- Gmina: Studzienice

Rynszt [rɨnʂt] is a settlement in the administrative district of Gmina Studzienice, within Bytów County, Pomeranian Voivodeship, in northern Poland.

For details of the history of the region, see History of Pomerania.
