= Widno, Bytów County =

Widno
- Settlement
- Location within Poland
- Coordinates: 54°6′32″N 17°43′0″E
- Country: Poland
- Voivodeship: Pomeranian
- County: Bytów
- Gmina: Studzienice

Widno [ˈvidnɔ] is a settlement in the administrative district of Gmina Studzienice, within Bytów County, Pomeranian Voivodeship, in northern Poland.

For details of the history of the region, see History of Pomerania.
