= Osowo Małe, Gmina Studzienice =

Osowo Małe
- Settlement
- Location within Poland
- Coordinates: 54°3′18″N 17°30′52″E
- Country: Poland
- Voivodeship: Pomeranian
- County: Bytów
- Gmina: Studzienice
- Population: 9

Osowo Małe [ɔˈsɔvɔ ˈmawɛ] is a settlement in the administrative district of Gmina Studzienice, within Bytów County, Pomeranian Voivodeship, in northern Poland.

== See also ==
History of Pomerania
