= Kębłów, Lower Silesian Voivodeship =

Kębłów
- Village
- Location within Poland
- Coordinates: 51°32′39″N 16°20′46″E
- Country: Poland
- Voivodeship: Lower Silesian
- County: Lubin
- Gmina: Rudna

Kębłów [ˈkɛmbwuf] is a village in the administrative district of Gmina Rudna, within Lubin County, Lower Silesian Voivodeship, in south-western Poland.
