= Bielawy, Bytów County =

Bielawy
- Settlement
- Location within Poland
- Coordinates: 54°6′8″N 17°41′33″E
- Country: Poland
- Voivodeship: Pomeranian
- County: Bytów
- Gmina: Studzienice

Bielawy ([bjɛˈlavɨ]; Kashubian: Biélawë) is a settlement in the administrative district of Gmina Studzienice within Bytów County, Pomeranian Voivodeship in northern Poland.

For details of the history of the region, see History of Pomerania.
