= Roog (disambiguation) =

Roog is the supreme deity in the Serer religion.

Roog may also refer to:

- "Roog" (story), a short story by Philip K. Dick
- John Roog, an original guitarist and former member of the band Thompson Twins

== See also ==
- Rog (disambiguation)
