= Wysokie, Lower Silesian Voivodeship =

Wysokie
- Village
- Location within Poland
- Coordinates: 51°31′N 16°19′E
- Country: Poland
- Voivodeship: Lower Silesian
- County: Lubin
- Gmina: Rudna

Wysokie [vɨˈsɔkʲɛ] is a village in the administrative district of Gmina Rudna, within Lubin County, Lower Silesian Voivodeship, in south-western Poland.
