= Gwizdanów =

- Village
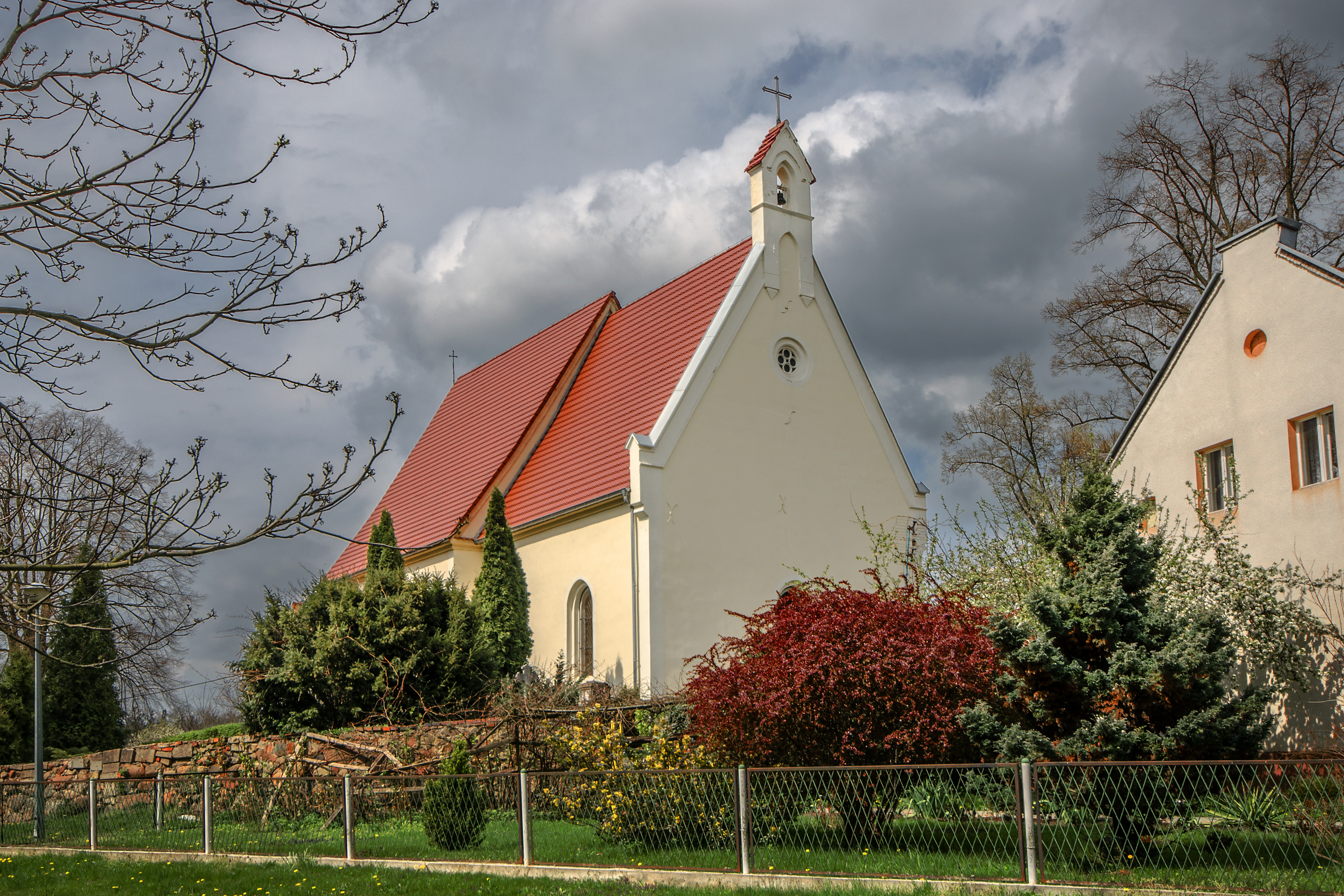
- Catholic church

- Location within Poland
- Coordinates: 51°31′51″N 16°17′18″E
- Country: Poland
- Voivodeship: Lower Silesian
- County: Lubin
- Gmina: Rudna

Gwizdanów [ɡvizˈdanuf] is a village in the administrative district of Gmina Rudna, within Lubin County, Lower Silesian Voivodeship, in south-western Poland.

== Notable residents ==
- Richard Linke (1909–1995), Luftwaffe pilot
