= Okuny =

- Settlement
- Location within Poland
- Coordinates: 54°3′47″N 17°31′1″E
- Country: Poland
- Voivodeship: Pomeranian
- County: Bytów
- Gmina: Studzienice
- Population: 18

Okuny [ɔˈkunɨ] is a settlement in the administrative district of Gmina Studzienice, within Bytów County, Pomeranian Voivodeship, in northern Poland.

For details of the history of the region, see History of Pomerania.
