= Fiszewo, Pomeranian Voivodeship =

Fiszewo
- Settlement
- Location within Poland
- Coordinates: 54°6′19″N 17°42′24″E
- Country: Poland
- Voivodeship: Pomeranian
- County: Bytów
- Gmina: Studzienice

Fiszewo [fiˈʂɛvɔ] (German: Fischwitz or Fischau) is a settlement in the administrative district of Gmina Studzienice, within Bytów County, Pomeranian Voivodeship, in northern Poland.

For details of the history of the region, see History of Pomerania.
