= Radoszyce, Lower Silesian Voivodeship =

Radoszyce
- Village
- Location within Poland
- Coordinates: 51°34′N 16°26′E
- Country: Poland
- Voivodeship: Lower Silesian
- County: Lubin
- Gmina: Rudna

Radoszyce [radɔˈʂɨt͡sɛ] is a village in the administrative district of Gmina Rudna, within Lubin County, Lower Silesian Voivodeship, in south-western Poland.
