= Chełm, Lubin County =

Chełm
- Village
- Location within Poland
- Coordinates: 51°34′35″N 16°23′35″E
- Country: Poland
- Voivodeship: Lower Silesian
- County: Lubin
- Gmina: Rudna
- Time zone: UTC+1 (CET)
  - Summer (DST): UTC+2 (CEST)
- Vehicle registration: DLU

Chełm (Polish pronunciation: [xɛwm]) is a village in the administrative district of Gmina Rudna, within Lubin County, Lower Silesian Voivodeship, in south-western Poland.
