= Kłączno =

- Village
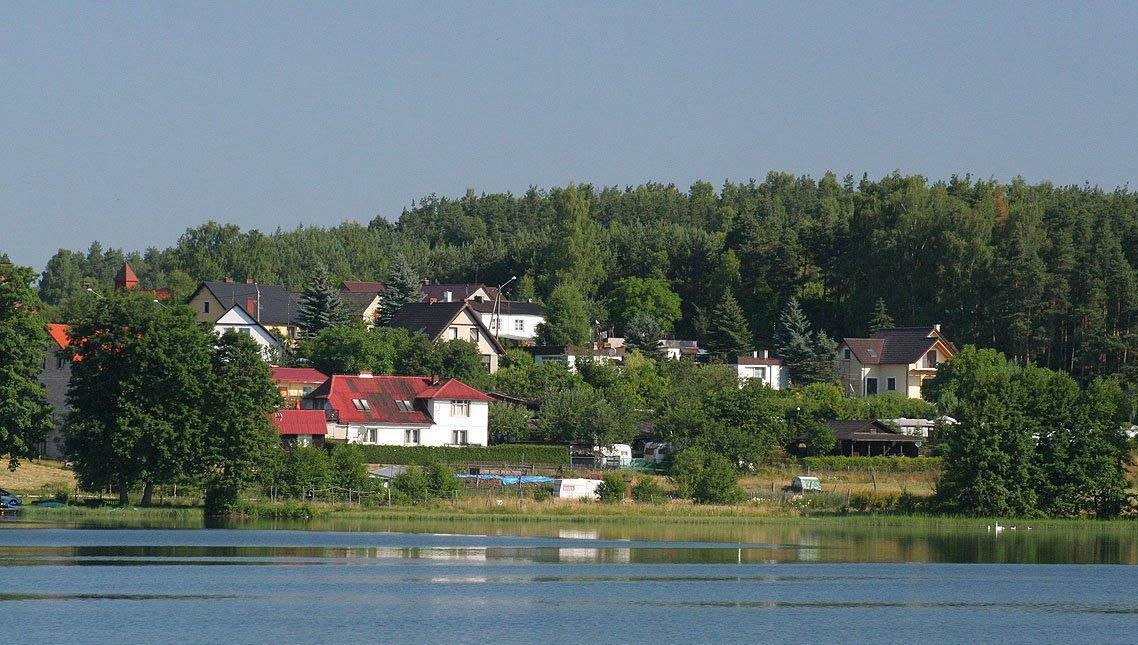

- Location within Poland
- Coordinates: 54°04′21″N 17°32′10″E
- Country: Poland
- Voivodeship: Pomeranian
- County: Bytów
- Gmina: Studzienice
- Elevation: 170 m (560 ft)
- Population (2004): 141
- Time zone: UTC+1 (CET)
  - Summer (DST): UTC+2 (CEST)
- Vehicle registration: GBY

Kłączno [ˈkwɔnt͡ʂnɔ] (German: Ulrichsdorf) is a village in Gmina Studzienice, Bytów County, Pomeranian Voivodeship, in northern Poland. It is located on the western shore of Kłączno Lake in the region of Kashubia.

== History ==
In 1939, the Germans carried out arrests of local Polish activists, whereas a local Polish teacher was captured and murdered by the invading Germans near Kościerzyna (see Nazi crimes against the Polish nation).

From 1975 to 1998 Kłączno was administratively located in Słupsk Voivodeship.
