= Rabacino =

- Village
- Location within Poland
- Coordinates: 54°07′43″N 17°34′53″E
- Country: Poland
- Voivodeship: Pomeranian
- County: Bytów
- Gmina: Studzienice
- Population (2006): 133
- Time zone: UTC+1 (CET)
  - Summer (DST): UTC+2 (CEST)
- Vehicle registration: GBY

Rabacino [rabaˈt͡ɕinɔ] is a village in Gmina Studzienice, Bytów County, Pomeranian Voivodeship, in northern Poland.

== History ==
During World War II, the local Polish teacher was among the victims of large massacres of Poles perpetrated by the Germans in the Forest of Szpęgawsk in 1939 (see Nazi crimes against the Polish nation).

From 1975 to 1998 the village was administratively located in Słupsk Voivodeship.
