= Gawrony, Lower Silesian Voivodeship =

Gawrony
- Village
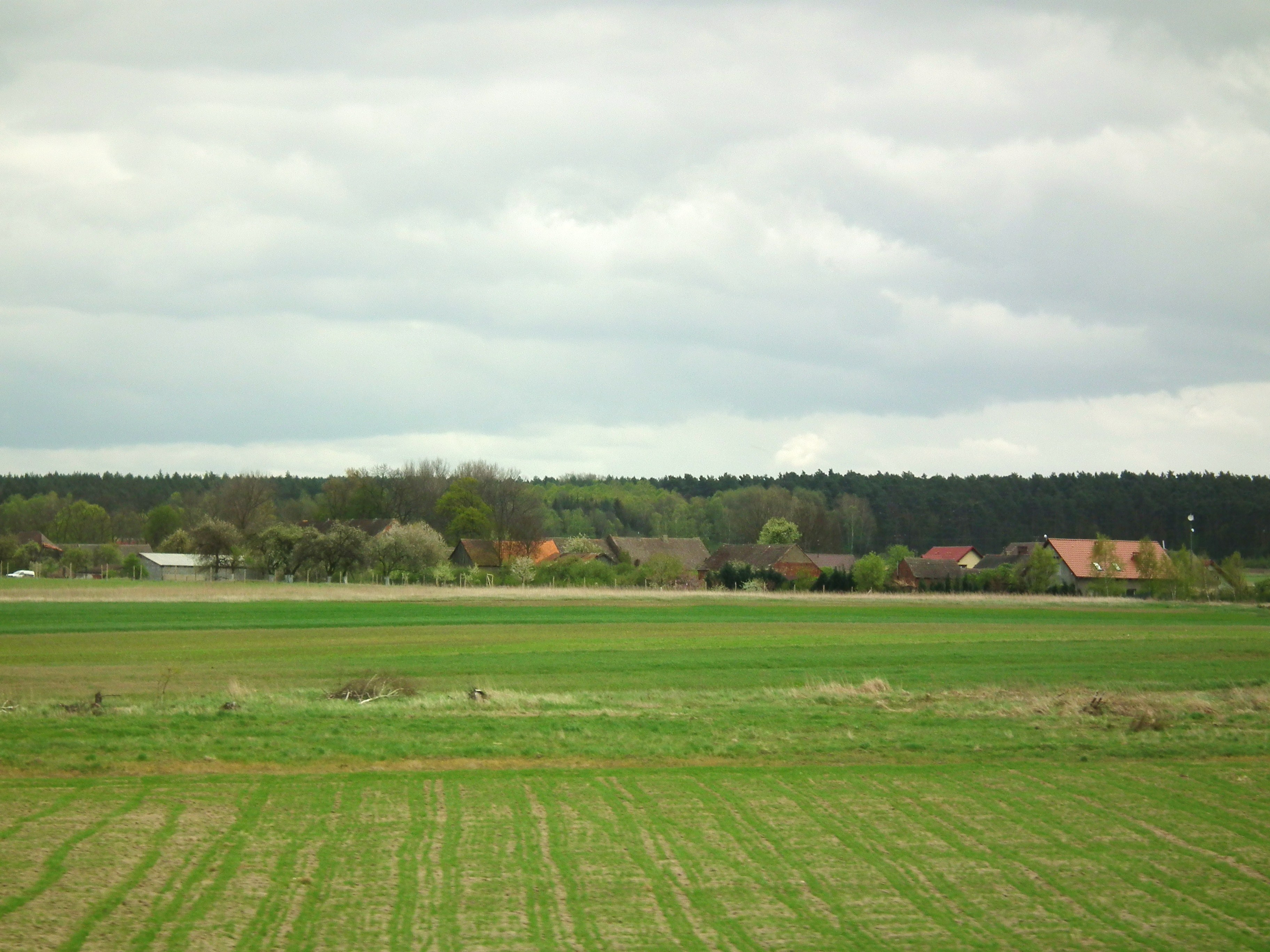

- Location within Poland
- Coordinates: 51°32′56″N 16°18′40″E
- Country: Poland
- Voivodeship: Lower Silesian
- County: Lubin
- Gmina: Rudna

Gawrony [ɡaˈvrɔnɨ] is a village in the administrative district of Gmina Rudna, within Lubin County, Lower Silesian Voivodeship, in south-western Poland.

Gawrony Castle is located nearby.
