= Brodów =

- Village
- Location within Poland
- Coordinates: 51°30′33″N 16°17′03″E
- Country: Poland
- Voivodeship: Lower Silesian
- County: Lubin
- Gmina: Rudna

Brodów [ˈbrɔduf] is a village in the administrative district of Gmina Rudna, within Lubin County, Lower Silesian Voivodeship, in south-western Poland.
