= Półczno =

- Village
- Location within Poland
- Coordinates: 54°08′57″N 17°38′26″E
- Country: Poland
- Voivodeship: Pomeranian
- County: Bytów
- Gmina: Studzienice
- Population (2006): 380

Półczno [ˈpuu̯t͡ʂnɔ] is a village in Gmina Studzienice, Bytów County, Pomeranian Voivodeship, in northern Poland.

From 1975 to 1998 the village was in Słupsk Voivodeship.

== Transport ==
Półczno lies along the national road.
