= Prądzonka =

- Village
- Location within Poland
- Coordinates: 54°1′53″N 17°32′47″E
- Country: Poland
- Voivodeship: Pomeranian
- County: Bytów
- Gmina: Studzienice
- Population: 30

Prądzonka [prɔnˈd͡zɔnka] is a village in the administrative district of Gmina Studzienice, within Bytów County, Pomeranian Voivodeship, in northern Poland.

For details of the history of the region, see History of Pomerania.
