= Jabłończ Wielka =

- Settlement
- Location within Poland
- Coordinates: 54°9′40″N 17°35′45″E
- Country: Poland
- Voivodeship: Pomeranian
- County: Bytów
- Gmina: Studzienice
- Population: 16

Jabłończ Wielka [ˈjabwɔɲt͡ʂ ˈvjɛlka] is a settlement in the administrative district of Gmina Studzienice, within Bytów County, Pomeranian Voivodeship, in northern Poland.

For details of the history of the region, see History of Pomerania.
