= Sominki =

- Settlement
- Location within Poland
- Coordinates: 54°1′51″N 17°37′25″E
- Country: Poland
- Voivodeship: Pomeranian
- County: Bytów
- Gmina: Studzienice
- Population: 10
- Website: http://www.sominki.pl/

Sominki [sɔˈminki] is a settlement in the administrative district of Gmina Studzienice, within Bytów County, Pomeranian Voivodeship, in northern Poland.

For details of the history of the region, see History of Pomerania.
