= Claude Weaver III =

American World War II flying ace

- Born: August 18, 1923; Oklahoma City, Oklahoma, US
- Died: January 28, 1944 (aged 20); Albert, France
- Burial place: Méharicourt Communal Cemetery
- Relatives: Claude Weaver (grandfather)
- Military career
- Allegiance: Canada
- Branch: (Canada) Royal Canadian Air Force
- Service years: 1941–1944
- Rank: Pilot Officer
- Nickname: "Weavy"
- Units: No. 185 Squadron RAF; No. 403 Squadron RCAF
- Conflicts: World War II: Siege of Malta
- Awards: Distinguished Flying Cross; Distinguished Flying Medal & Bar; Mentioned in Dispatches

Claude Weaver III DFC, DFM & Bar (August 18, 1923 – January 28, 1944) was an American pilot who joined the Royal Canadian Air Force during World War II. He was the youngest Allied flying ace of the war and was credited with 12.5 aerial victories. He was shot down and taken as a prisoner of war for one year before successfully escaping captivity, however he was later shot down a second time and killed.

== Early life and training ==
Claude Weaver was born on August 18, 1923, in Oklahoma City. Weaver dropped out of Classen High School and travelled to Windsor, Ontario, where he enlisted into the Royal Canadian Air Force on February 13, 1941.

On July 27, Weaver completed training at No. 17 Elementary Flying Training School in Stanley, Nova Scotia, graduating at the bottom of his class. He then began attending training at No. 8 Service Flying Training School in Moncton, New Brunswick. On August 6, Weaver made a forced landing and was disciplined for his carelessness. On October 10, Weaver was awarded his flying wings and promoted to sergeant, graduating last in his class of 39.

== World War II ==
=== Siege of Malta ===
Sergeant Weaver arrived in the United Kingdom on November 14. Weaver began attending additional training and was graded to be an above average pilot. From April to May 1942, he was assigned to 412 Squadron in the Middle East. In late June, Weaver was attached to No. 185 Squadron operating Supermarine Spitfires out of Malta.

On July 17, Sergeant Weaver downed his first enemy aircraft, an Messerschmitt Bf 109. On July 22, he downed two more Bf 109s, and then two more the next day. These victories made Weaver, aged 18, the youngest Allied flying ace of the war. On July 24, Weaver shared a sixth victory with a fellow pilot, downing a Junkers Ju 88 bomber. Weaver was awarded the Distinguished Flying Medal on August 8.

On September 9, Sergeant Weaver participated in a combat mission over Sicily. During the mission, Weaver downed an Italian MC.202, making him a double ace with 10.5 victories. Weaver himself was shot down shortly afterwards and crash landed on a beach in Scoglitti. Before he had a chance to destroy his plane, Weaver was arrested by Carabinieri and listed as missing in action by his squadron.

=== Prisoner of war ===
On September 14, Weaver was taken to Camp 50 in Italy. While he was there, Weaver was put in solitary confinement and interrogated. By the end of the month, he was moved to Camp 21 in Chieti, Italy, where he would spend the next several months.

In March 1943, Weaver made his first attempt to escape. He tried to force his way through the barbed wire on the perimeter of the camp, but he got stuck for half an hour. Upon being discovered, Weaver was severely beaten, with one guard breaking the buttstock of his rifle over him. Soon afterwards, he was moved to Camp 49 in Fontanellato. At Camp 49, Weaver attempted to escape a third time, crawling through a sewer. The sewer was blocked at one end however, and he had to abandon his escape attempt. After three months at Camp 49, Weaver was moved back to Camp 21.

In September 1943, as the Allies invaded Italy, many of the Italian guards deserted the POW camp. Weaver and another officer escaped the camp, scaling two wire fences and a 16-foot wall. Using forged papers to fool German guards, the pair travelled about 300 miles to Allied lines. When he was roughly 20 miles from Allied positions, Weaver sprained his ankle, yet he managed to ride a mule to British lines on September 25.

=== Later war service ===
Weaver was subsequently questioned by officers in General Montgomery's staff. He was taken back to Malta and rejoined his old squadron for a few days. By mid-October, Pilot Officer Weaver had returned to the United Kingdom and joined No. 403 Squadron.

On December 30, Pilot Officer Weaver shot down a Bf 109, his first victory in over a year. On January 21, 1944, Weaver scored his final victory, a Focke-Wulf Fw 190. This brought his total number of victories to 12.5 with 3 probables.

== Death and legacy ==
One week later on January 28, Pilot Officer Weaver was shot down over France by German fighter ace Heinz-Gerhard Vogt. While attempting to bail out, Weaver's parachute was caught on the tail of his plane and he was pulled to the ground. Weaver survived the crash, but was critically injured. He was taken by German troops to a hospital in Albert, but he succumbed to his injuries a few hours later. Weaver was buried in the Communal Cemetery in Méharicourt.

Weaver was reported missing in action a second time. He was awarded the Distinguished Flying Cross in March, and was mentioned in dispatches a few months later. In 1994, Claude Weaver III was inducted into the Oklahoma Aviation and Space Hall of Fame.

== Relations ==
Weaver's grandfather, Claude Weaver, was an Oklahoman Congressman. Additionally, his brother, Corporal David O. Weaver, was a United States Marine who was killed in March 1945 during the battle of Iwo Jima.
