= Nieszczyce =

- Village
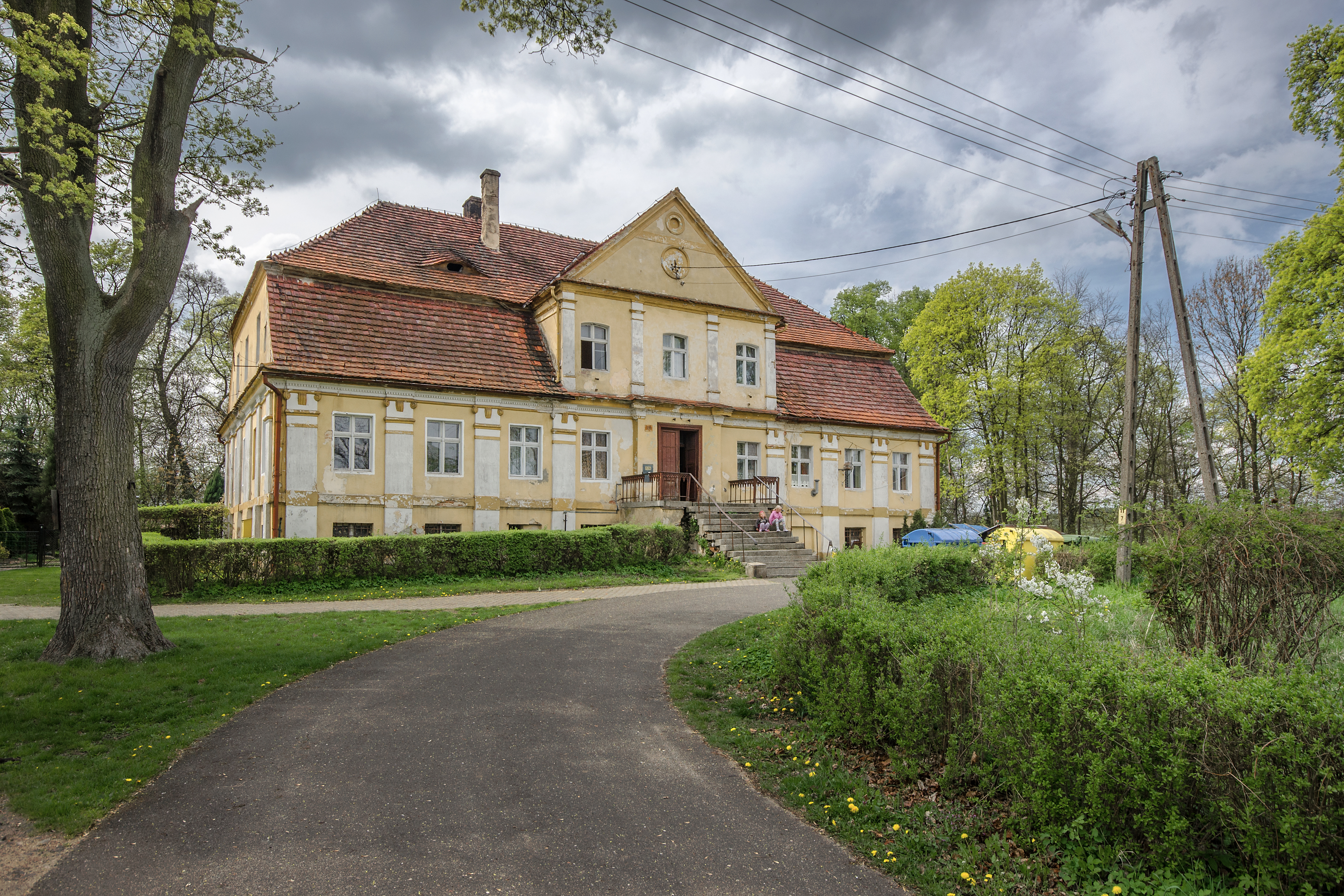
- Nieszczyce Manor House

- Location within Poland
- Coordinates: 51°33′09″N 16°24′02″E
- Country: Poland
- Voivodeship: Lower Silesian
- County: Lubin
- Gmina: Rudna

Nieszczyce [ɲɛʂˈt͡ʂɨt͡sɛ] is a village in the administrative district of Gmina Rudna, within Lubin County, Lower Silesian Voivodeship, in south-western Poland.
