= Rudna-Leśna =

- Village
- Location within Poland
- Coordinates: 51°30′18″N 16°16′22″E
- Country: Poland
- Voivodeship: Lower Silesian
- County: Lubin
- Gmina: Rudna

Rudna-Leśna [ˈrudna ˈlɛɕna] is a village and housing estate in the administrative district of Gmina Rudna, within Lubin County, Lower Silesian Voivodeship, in south-western Poland.
