= Róg railway station =

Railway station in Poland

Róg

General information
- Location: Róg; Poland
- Coordinates: 54.107610°N 17.678471°E
- Owner: Polskie Koleje Państwowe S.A.

Construction
- Structure type: Building: No; Depot: No; Water tower: No

History
- Former names: Sonnenwalde (Kr. Bütow) until 1945
Location

Róg is a non-operational PKP railway station in Róg (Pomeranian Voivodeship), Poland.

== Lines crossing the station ==
Start station	End station	Line type
Lipusz	Korzybie	Freight
