= Kliszów, Lower Silesian Voivodeship =

Kliszów
- Village
- Location within Poland
- Coordinates: 51°30′0″N 16°21′32″E
- Country: Poland
- Voivodeship: Lower Silesian
- County: Lubin
- Gmina: Rudna

Kliszów [ˈkliʂuf] is a village in the administrative district of Gmina Rudna, within Lubin County, Lower Silesian Voivodeship, in south-western Poland..
