= German Republics =

Since the German revolution of 1918–1919 and the abdication of Wilhelm II, there have been four states have used some variation of the name German Republic (Republik Deutschland):

- The Weimar Republic, commonly known at the time as the German Republic, the historical German state in existence from 1919 to 1933
- The German Democratic Republic (East Germany), the historical German socialist state aligned with Eastern Bloc in existence from 1949 to 1990
- The Federal Republic of Germany (West Germany), also called the Bonn Republic, the contemporary German state aligned with Western Bloc between 1949 and 1990
- The Federal Republic of Germany (reunited Germany), also called the Berlin Republic, the contemporary German state since 1990

The term may also refer to the "Free Socialist Republic of Germany" which was proclaimed during the German revolution of 1918–1919

== See also ==
- Republic of German-Austria
