= Łubieniec =

- Settlement
- Location within Poland
- Coordinates: 54°8′42″N 17°35′7″E
- Country: Poland
- Voivodeship: Pomeranian
- County: Bytów
- Gmina: Studzienice

Łubieniec [wuˈbjɛɲɛt͡s] is a settlement in the administrative district of Gmina Studzienice, within Bytów County, Pomeranian Voivodeship, in northern Poland.

For details of the history of the region, see History of Pomerania.
