= Orsk, Lower Silesian Voivodeship =

Orsk
- Village
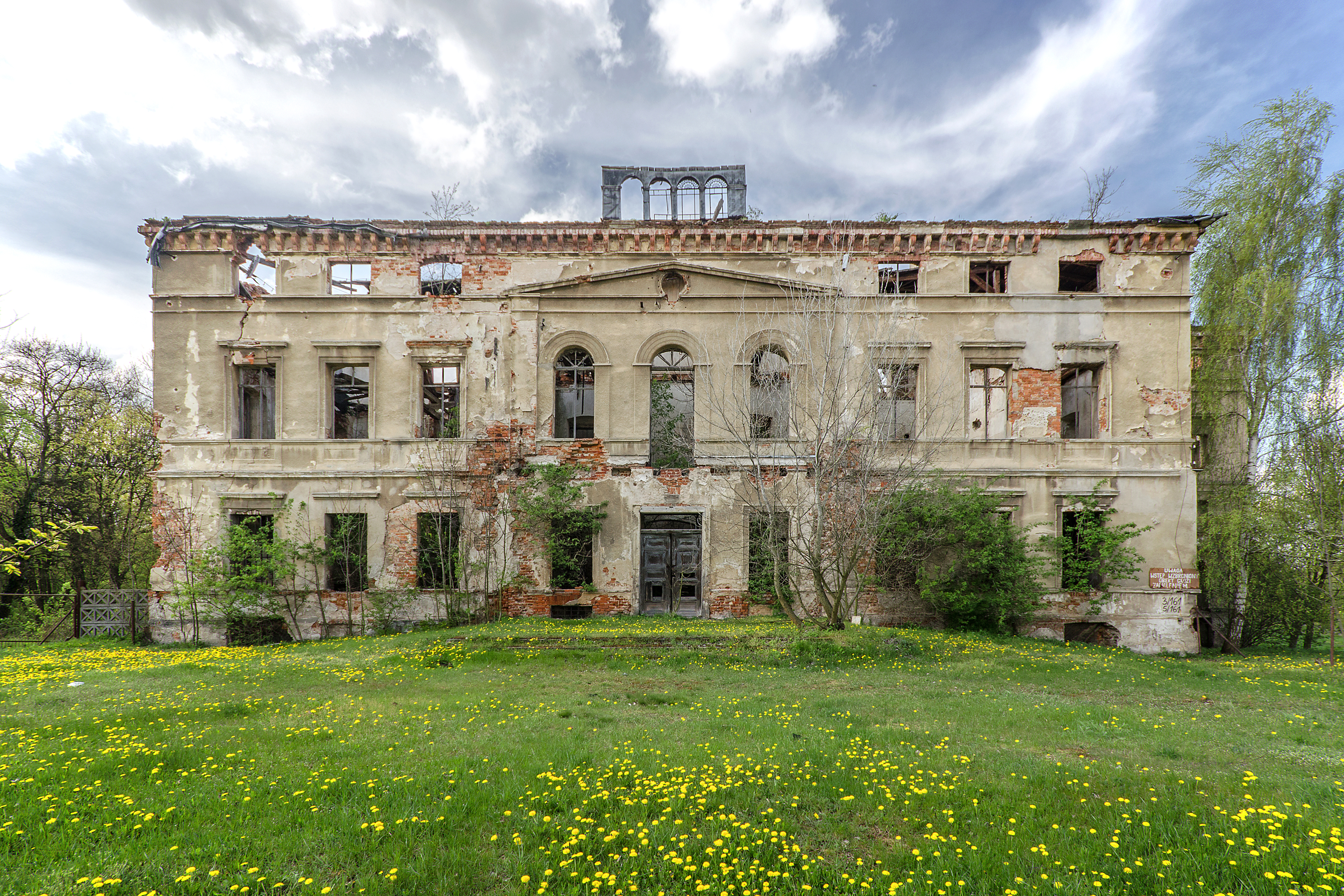
- Palace

- Location within Poland
- Coordinates: 51°35′N 16°21′E
- Country: Poland
- Voivodeship: Lower Silesian
- County: Lubin
- Gmina: Rudna

Orsk [ɔrsk] is a village in the administrative district of Gmina Rudna, within Lubin County, Lower Silesian Voivodeship, in south-western Poland.
