= Naroczyce =

- Village
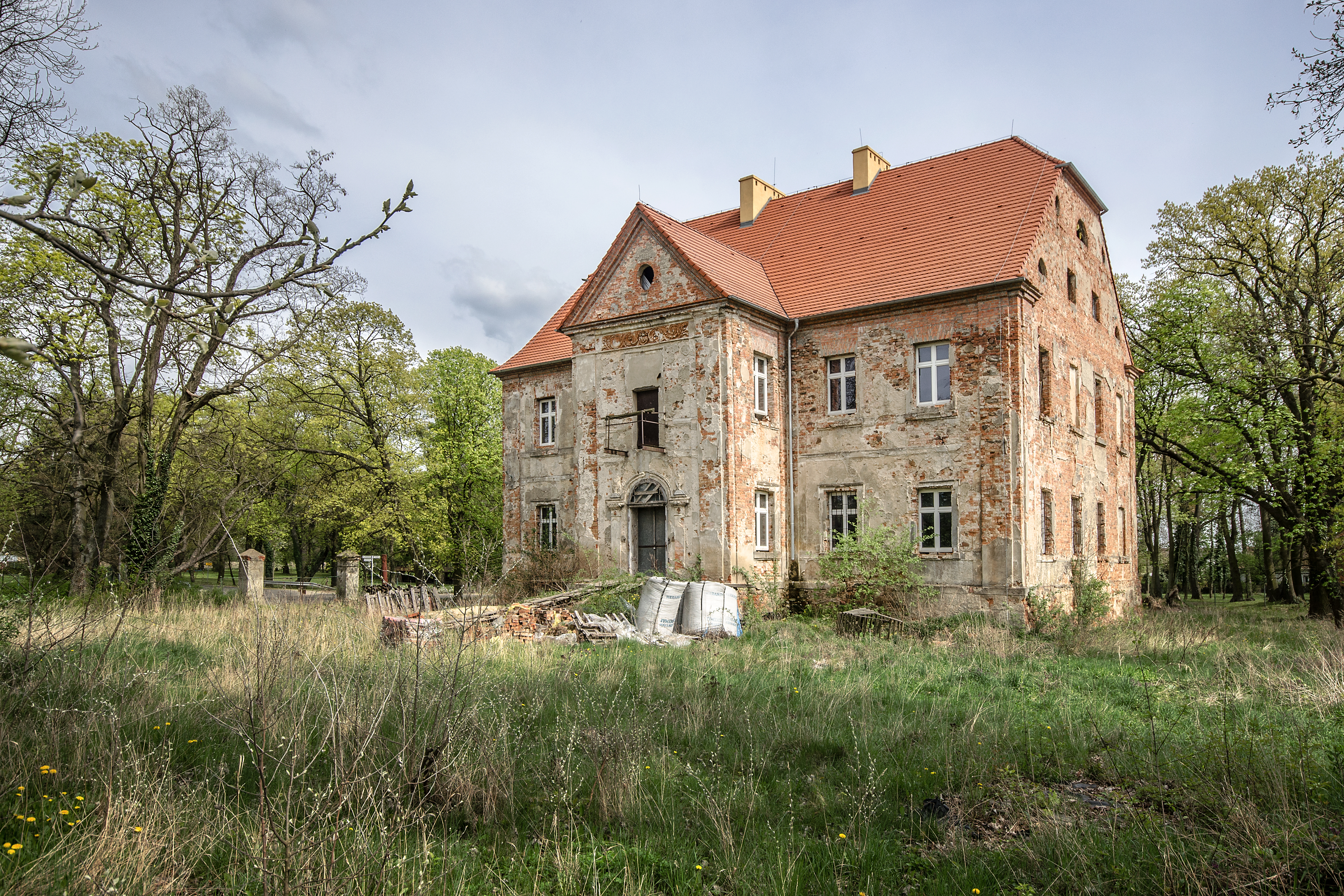
- Naroczyce pałace

- Location within Poland
- Coordinates: 51°31′33″N 16°25′43″E
- Country: Poland
- Voivodeship: Lower Silesian
- County: Lubin
- Gmina: Rudna

Naroczyce [narɔˈt͡ʂɨt͡sɛ] is a village in the administrative district of Gmina Rudna, within Lubin County, Lower Silesian Voivodeship, in south-western Poland.
