= Koźlice, Pomeranian Voivodeship =

Koźlice
- Settlement
- Location within Poland
- Coordinates: 54°3′11″N 17°37′2″E
- Country: Poland
- Voivodeship: Pomeranian
- County: Bytów
- Gmina: Studzienice

Koźlice [kɔˈʑlit͡sɛ] is a settlement in the administrative district of Gmina Studzienice, within Bytów County, Pomeranian Voivodeship, in northern Poland.
