= Osława Dąbrowa =

- Village
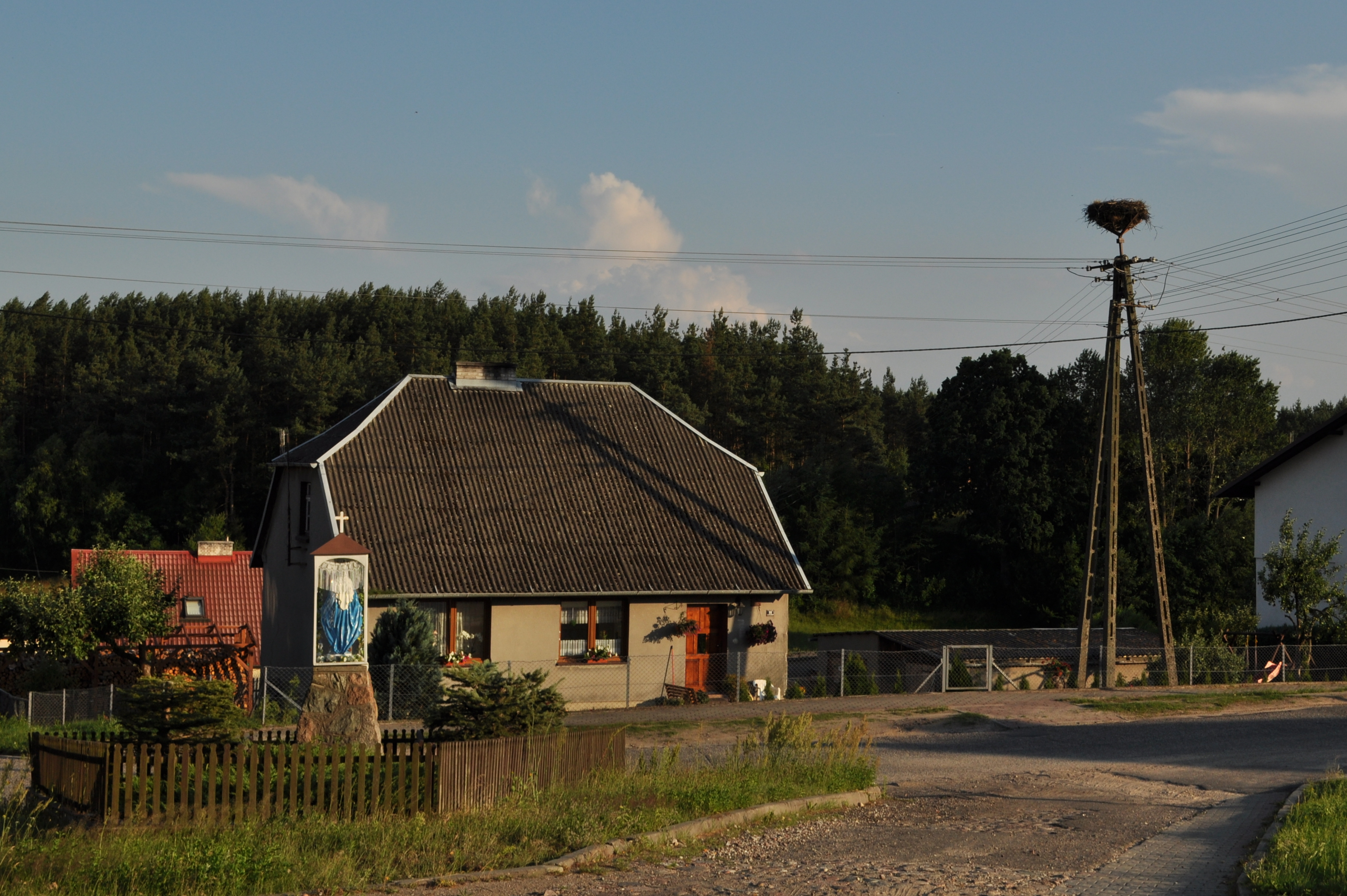

- Location within Poland
- Coordinates: 54°06′N 17°37′E
- Country: Poland
- Voivodeship: Pomeranian
- County: Bytów
- Gmina: Studzienice
- Population: 356
- Time zone: UTC+1 (CET)
  - Summer (DST): UTC+2 (CEST)
- Vehicle registration: GBY

Osława Dąbrowa [ɔˈswava dɔmˈbrɔva] is a village in Gmina Studzienice, Bytów County, Pomeranian Voivodeship, in northern Poland. It is located on the shore of Dłużecko Lake in the region of Kashubia.

== History ==
During the German invasion of Poland, which started World War II in September 1939, the Germans carried out arrests of local Polish leaders and activists (see Nazi crimes against the Polish nation).

From 1975 to 1998 the village was in Słupsk Voivodeship.
