= Ugoszcz, Pomeranian Voivodeship =

Ugoszcz
- Village
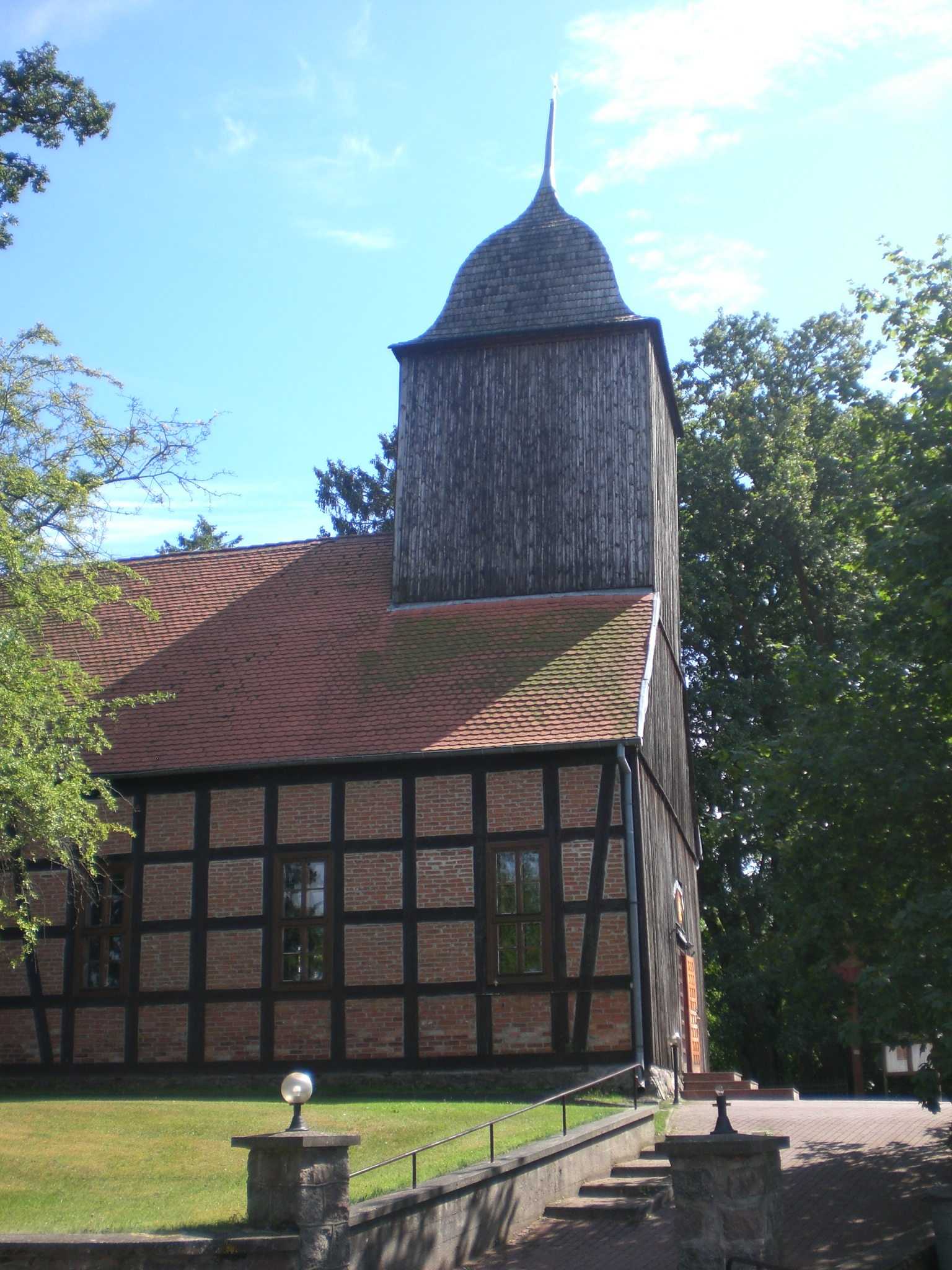
- Mary Magdalene church in Ugoszcz

- Location within Poland
- Coordinates: 54°07′21″N 17°31′41″E
- Country: Poland
- Voivodeship: Pomeranian
- County: Bytów
- Gmina: Studzienice
- Population: 740
- Time zone: UTC+1 (CET)
  - Summer (DST): UTC+2 (CEST)
- Vehicle registration: GBY

Ugoszcz [ˈuɡɔʂt͡ʂ] is a village in Gmina Studzienice, Bytów County, Pomeranian Voivodeship, in northern Poland.

== History ==
In 1885, the village had a population of 717.

In 1939, the Germans arrested local Polish activists and teachers, and expelled the local Polish organist.

From 1975 to 1998 the village was in Słupsk Voivodeship.
