= Heinz-Gerhard Vogt =

German fighter ace and Knight's Cross recipient

Gerhard Vogt
- Born: 29 November 1919; Raudten near Lüben
- Died: 14 January 1945 (aged 25) near Cologne
- Cause of death: Killed in action
- Military career
- Allegiance: Nazi Germany
- Branch: Luftwaffe
- Service years: 1939–1945
- Rank: Oberleutnant (first lieutenant)
- Unit: JG 26
- Commands: 7./JG 26, 5./JG 26
- Conflicts: See battles World War II: Western Front; Defense of the Reich; Battle of Arnhem
- Awards: Knight's Cross of the Iron Cross

Gerhard Vogt (29 November 1919 – 14 January 1945) was a German Luftwaffe military aviator and fighter ace during World War II. He is credited with 48 aerial victories, claimed over the Western Front and in Defense of the Reich in 174 combat missions.

Born in Raudten, Vogt grew up in the Weimar Republic and Nazi Germany. He joined the military service in the Luftwaffe and was trained as a fighter pilot. Following flight training, he was posted to Jagdgeschwader 26 "Schlageter" (JG 26—26th Fighter Wing) in September 1941. Flying with this wing, Vogt claimed his first aerial victory on 6 November 1941 on the Western Front over a Royal Australian Air Force fighter aircraft. In August 1944, he was appointed squadron leader of 5. Staffel (5th squadron) of JG 26 and was awarded the Knight's Cross of the Iron Cross on 25 November 1944 for 46 aerial victories claimed. On 14 January 1945, Vogt was killed in action when he was shot down by United States Army Air Forces fighters southeast of Cologne-Eil.

== Early life ==
Vogt was born on 29 November 1919 in Raudten near Lüben, present-day Rudna in south-western Poland, at the time in the Province of Lower Silesia, a Free State of Prussia in the Weimar Republic.

== World War II ==
World War II in Europe began on Friday 1 September 1939 when German forces invaded Poland. In September 1941, Vogt was transferred from the Ergänzungs-Jagdgruppe West, a supplementary training unit for fighter pilots destined to fight on the Western Front, to Jagdgeschwader 26 "Schlageter" (JG 26—26th Fighter Wing). Vogt was assigned to the 6. Staffel (6th squadron) on 16 September. His unit was subordinated to II. Gruppe (2nd group) of JG 26 and had just been equipped with the Focke-Wulf Fw 190 A-1. The commanding officers were Oberleutnant Walter Schneider, Staffelkapitän (squadron leader), and Hauptmann Walter Adolph, the Gruppenkommandeur (group commander). Already two days later, Adolph was killed in action and replaced by Hauptmann Joachim Müncheberg.

Vogt claimed his first victory when he shot down a Royal Australian Air Force (RAAF) Supermarine Spitfire fighter from No. 452 Squadron over Calais on 6 November 1941. No. 452 Squadron was part of the Kenley Wing on a mission to attack targets of opportunity in northern France. Later that month, on 23 November, he claimed his second aerial victory when he shot down a Spitfire from the No. 315 Polish Fighter Squadron west of Dunkirk. On 24 March 1942, Vogt made a forced landing in his Fw 190 A-1 (Werknummer 0013—factory number) at Abbeville-Drucat Airfield following combat with a Spitfire. Vogt, who was wounded in this encounter, was probably shot down by Warrant Officer L.N. Powell from No. 412 Squadron.

=== Defense of the Reich ===
On 17 August 1942, the United States Army Air Forces (USAAF) flew its first heavy bomber mission over Europe. As part of "Circuses" No. 204, 17 USAAF Boeing B-17 Flying Fortress bombers, supported by four Spitfire squadrons from the Biggin Hill Wing and Tangmere Wing, attacked the Rouen railroad yards. Scrambled to intercept this attackforce, Vogt claimed a Spitfire from either No. 401 Squadron or No. 402 Squadron shot down in combat north-northwest of Fécamp. He claimed a Spitfire from No. 111 Squadron destroyed on 27 August. The Spitfire was on a fighter escort mission for bombers targeting the Luftwaffe airfield at Abbeville-Drucat and was shot down west of the Baie de Somme.

On 2 February 1943, Vogt was shot down in Messerschmitt Bf 109 G-4 (Werknummer 16129) by Spitfires from No. 331 Squadron in combat near Ypres. Forced to bail out, he was wounded in the encounter. His victor may have been Flight Lieutenant Helner Grundt-Spang. He claimed his first heavy bomber in Defense of the Reich on 22 June during the Battle of the Ruhr. That day, the USAAF VIII Bomber Command flew a mission to the Ruhr area. The primary target was the synthetic rubber plant at Hüls. Vogt shot down a B-17 bomber from either 381st Bombardment Group or 384th Bombardment Group 10 km (6.2 mi) west of Dunkirk.

On 30 July, he was wounded again when he bailed out of his Fw 190 A-5 (Werknummer 410006) following combat with a B-17 bomber northeast of Duisburg. A month later, he made a forced landing at Romilly after his Fw 190 A-4 (Werknummer 42456) sustained combat damage. Vogt shot down Australian Flight Lieutenant Tony Gaze from No. 66 Squadron on 4 September near Le Tréport. Gaze was on a fighter escort mission for American Martin B-26 Marauder bombers and RAF Douglas A-20 Havoc, Lockheed Ventura and North American B-25 Mitchell bombers into northern France.

Combat box of a 12-plane B-17 squadron. Three such boxes completed a 36-plane group box.: 1. Lead Element; 2. High Element; 3. Low Element; 4. Low Low Element

On 28 January 1944, Vogt claimed a Spitfire from the Royal Canadian Air Force (RCAF) No. 403 Squadron in combat southwest of Albert. Pilot Officer Claude Weaver was critically injured and died shortly after in a hospital. On 8 March, the Eighth Air Force, formerly known as VIII Bomber Command, targeted Berlin with 702 heavy bombers, in particular the ball bearing factory at Erkner. In total, 17 escort fighters and 37 bombers were lost, including two B-17 bombers credited to Vogt. The first B-17, from either 96th Bombardment Group or 388th Bombardment Group was shot down 16 km (9.9 mi) southwest of Gardelegen. The second B-17 from the 452d Bombardment Group, for which he received credit, was a Herausschuss (separation shot) claimed 15 km (9.3 mi) east of Nienburg. A Herausschuss was a severely damaged heavy bomber forced to separate from its combat box which normally was counted as an aerial victory.

Vogt was awarded the German Cross in Gold (Deutsches Kreuz in Gold) on 20 March. On 12 April, Vogt was credited with two aerial victories over Consolidated B-24 Liberator bombers from the 445th Bombardment Group. The next day, he was credited with his fifth aerial victory over a heavy bomber on 13 April 1944. That day, he claimed a Herausschuss over a B-17 in the vicinity of Trier. In May, he became an officer, attaining the rank of Leutnant (second lieutenant).

After the Allies launched Operation Overlord, the invasion of Normandy on 6 June, Luftflotte Reich sent additional units to the invasion front. By 8 June, Jagdgeschwader 1, Jagdgeschwader 3, Jagdgeschwader 11 and III. Gruppe of Jagdgeschwader 54 had arrived in France and were subordinated to Fliegerkorps II. II. Gruppe of JG 26 was fully operational at Guyancourt and flew multiple missions to the combat area that day. In the early morning, Vogt claimed a North American P-51 Mustang fighter from the RAF No. 168 Squadron. The P-51 had been on a tactical reconnaissance mission and was shot down north of Caen.

=== Squadron leader ===
On 20 June, Vogt temporarily took command of 7. Staffel of JG 26 when Oberleutnant Waldemar Radener had been seriously wounded in aerial combat on 15 June. The Eighth Air Force and Allied Expeditionary Air Force (AEAF) sent over a thousand bombers to support the breakout of Normandy beachhead on 22 June. II. Gruppe of JG 26 was ordered to intercept the bombers and fighter escorts heading for Paris. During this mission, Vogt was credited with a Herausschuss over a B-17 near Paris.

Command of 7. Staffel was officially handed to Leutnant Hans Prager on 15 August while Vogt was appointed Staffelkapitän of 5. Staffel of JG 26 on 14 August 1944, replacing Hauptmann Walter Matoni who was transferred. On 21 September, during the Battle of Arnhem, Vogt shot down an unarmed Douglas C-47 Skytrain transport aircraft on a mission to drop reinforcements for the British 1st Airborne Division. On 23 September, the Allied flew resupplies to the combat area around Arnhem. The transport aircraft were protected by 519 fighters from the VIII Fighter Command and 40 Lockheed P-38 Lightning fighters from the Ninth Air Force. German fighters dispatched by Luftflotte Reich never reached the transports. Over Goch, II. Gruppe intercepted a flight of P-51 fighters from the 352nd Fighter Group. For the loss of one of their own, II. Gruppe shot down four P-51 fighters, including two by Vogt.

In November II. Gruppe was ordered to relocate to an airfield at Reinsehlen, south of Hamburg, where the pilots received the Fw 190 D-9, equipped with an inline engine. Vogt claimed his last aerial victory flying a radial engined Fw 190 A on 19 November when he shot down a Spitfire from RCAF No. 412 Squadron. On 25 November, two pilots of JG 26 were awarded the Knight's Cross of the Iron Cross (Ritterkreuz des Eisernen Kreuzes), Vogt for 46 aerial victories and Major Karl Borris, the commander of I. Gruppe, for 41 aerial victories. He claimed his 48th and last aerial victory on 26 December during the Siege of Bastogne as part of Battle of the Bulge. That day, he was credited with an Auster shot down near Bastogne.

=== Operation Bodenplatte and death ===
Vogt led 5. Staffel during Operation Bodenplatte on 1 January 1945, an attempt at gaining air superiority during the stagnant stage of the Battle of the Bulge. II. Gruppe, under the leadership of Major Anton Hackl was based at Nordhorn at attacked the Evere Airfield at Brussels. Together with III. Gruppe, which was led by Hauptmann Walter Krupinski, the attack on Evere was the only successful mission. II. Gruppe lost 13 Fw 190s destroyed and two damaged. Nine of its pilots were missing; five were killed and four captured. While III. Gruppe lost six Bf 109s and four pilots, one of them was captured, the others were killed. Allied losses are given at Evere as 32 fighters, 22 twin-engine aircraft and 13 four-engine aircraft destroyed, plus another nine single-, six twin- and one four-engine aircraft damaged.

On 14 January, during the retreat of German forces in the Ardennes, Vogt was shot down and killed by USAAF P-51 fighters of the 78th Fighter Group in his FW 190 D-9 (Werknummer 210176) southeast of Cologne-Eil. That day, JG 26 lost 13 pilots killed in action, more than on any other day of the war.

== Summary of career ==
=== Aerial victory claims ===
According to Weal, Vogt was credited with 48 aerial victories. Obermaier also lists him with 48 aerial victories, all of which over the Western Allies, claimed in 174 combat missions. In addition, Spick lists him with a mission-to-claim ratio of 3.63. Mathews and Foreman, authors of Luftwaffe Aces — Biographies and Victory Claims, researched the German Federal Archives and found records for 47 aerial victories, plus one further unconfirmed claim. All of his aerial victories were claimed over the Western Allies and includes eight four-engined bombers.

Chronicle of aerial victories
This and the – (dash) indicates unwitnessed aerial victory claims for which Vogt did not receive credit. This along with the * (asterisk) indicates an Herausschuss (separation shot)—a severely damaged heavy bomber forced to separate from his combat box which was counted as an aerial victory. This and the ? (question mark) indicates information discrepancies listed by Prien, Stemmer, Rodeike, Bock, Mathews and Foreman.
Claim	Date	Time	Type	Location	Claim	Date	Time	Type	Location
– 6. Staffel of Jagdgeschwader 26 "Schlageter" – At the Channel and over England — 22 June – 31 December 1941
1	6 November 1941	15:40	Spitfire	Calais	2	23 November 1941	13:28	Spitfire	west of Dunkirk
– 6. Staffel of Jagdgeschwader 26 "Schlageter" – On the Western Front — 1 January – 31 December 1942
3	4 April 1942	11:40	Spitfire	Watten	8	27 August 1942	13:43? (Note: According to Mathews and Foreman claimed at 13:44.)	Spitfire	west of the Baie de Somme
4	1 May 1942	19:46? (Note: According to Mathews and Foreman claimed at 19:48.)	Spitfire	Dover	9	2 November 1942	15:24? (Note: According to Mathews and Foreman claimed at 15:26.)	Spitfire	15 km (9.3 mi) southwest of Boulogne
5	8 June 1942	14:03	Spitfire	Dunkirk	10	8 November 1942	12:51	Spitfire	3 km (1.9 mi) east of Calais-Marck
6	26 July 1942	13:28	Spitfire	west of Le Tréport; 15–29 km (9.3–18.0 mi) west of Le Touquet	11	6 December 1942	08:36	Spitfire	10 km (6.2 mi) northwest of Dieppe
7	17 August 1942	18:52? (Note: According to Mathews and Foreman claimed at 18:53.)	Spitfire	north-northwest of Fécamp					
– 6. Staffel of Jagdgeschwader 26 "Schlageter" – On the Western Front — 1 January – September 1943
12	22 June 1943	11:41	B-17	10 km (6.2 mi) west of Dunkirk	15	4 September 1943	19:55	Spitfire	6 km (3.7 mi) west of Berck
13	26 July 1943	11:26	Spitfire	Mouscron	16	27 September 1943	18:52	Spitfire	15 km (9.3 mi) southeast of Fécamp
14	4 September 1943	10:30	Spitfire	south of Le Tréport					
– 7. Staffel of Jagdgeschwader 26 "Schlageter" – On the Western Front — 29 November – 31 December 1943
17	29 November 1943	10:05	Spitfire	Koksijde, southwest of Ostend					
– 7. Staffel of Jagdgeschwader 26 "Schlageter" – On the Western Front and Defense of the Reich — 1 January – 31 December 1944
18	28 January 1944	15:37	Spitfire	southwest of Albert	21	12 April 1944	13:08	B-24*	southwest of Liège
—	29 January 1944	—	P-47	10 km (6.2 mi) north of Trier	22	12 April 1944	13:28	B-24*	vicinity of Liège
19	8 March 1944	13:30	B-17	16 km (9.9 mi) southwest of Gardelegen	23	13 April 1944	13:23	B-17*	vicinity of Trier
20	8 March 1944	13:33? (Note: According to Mathews and Foreman claimed at 13:30.)	B-17*	15 km (9.3 mi) east of Nienburg					
– 5. Staffel of Jagdgeschwader 26 "Schlageter" – On the Western Front and Defense of the Reich — 1 January – 31 December 1944
24	27 April 1944	17:40	P-47	7 km (4.3 mi) south of Soissons	26	8 June 1944	06:00	P-51	north of Caen
25	29 April 1944	14:30	B-17	northeast of Saint-Omer					
– 7. Staffel of Jagdgeschwader 26 "Schlageter" – On the Western Front and Defense of the Reich — 20 June – 14 August 1944
27	22 June 1944	19:00? (Note: According to Mathews and Foreman claimed at 19:05.)	B-17*	southeast of Paris	29	24 June 1944	21:33	P-47	west of Dreux
28	23 June 1944	13:08? (Note: According to Mathews and Foreman claimed at 13:09.)	P-51	Saint-Lô	30	25 June 1944	15:35	P-38	west of Rouen
– 7. Staffel of Jagdgeschwader 26 "Schlageter" – On the Western Front and Defense of the Reich — 15 August 1944 – 14 January 1945
31	15 August 1944	12:29? (Note: According to Mathews and Foreman claimed at 12:24.)	P-47	Versailles	40	23 September 1944	17:33	P-51	Goch
32	19 August 1944	10:24	P-47	northeast of Paris	41	23 September 1944	17:35	P-51	Goch
33	25 August 1944	13:45	P-38	west of Beauvais	42	25 September 1944	17:54? (Note: According to Mathews and Foreman claimed at 17:55.)	Spitfire	Arnhem
34	26 August 1944	09:20	Spitfire	east of Neufchâtel	43	27 September 1944	10:41	Spitfire	Nijmegen
35	29 August 1944	09:40	Auster	Soissons	44	28 October 1944	13:25	Typhoon	between Venlo and Kempen
36	17 September 1944	18:00	P-51	Bocholt	45	19 November 1944	14:06	Spitfire	north of Kirchhellen
37	18 September 1944	13:25	P-51	Luxembourg	46	24 December 1944	12:28	P-47	Liège
38	19 September 1944	18:03	P-51	Emmerich; Luxembourg	47	26 December 1944	14:15	Auster	Bastogne
39	21 September 1944	17:17	C-47	Nijmegen					

=== Awards ===
- Iron Cross (1939) 2nd and 1st Class
- Honor Goblet of the Luftwaffe on 17 January 1944 as Feldwebel and pilot (Note: According to Obermaier on 12 December 1943.)
- German Cross in Gold on 20 March 1944 as Feldwebel in the 7./Jagdgeschwader 26
- Knight's Cross of the Iron Cross on 25 November 1944 as Leutnant and Staffelführer of the 5./Jagdgeschwader 26 "Schlageter"
