= Koźlice, Lubin County =

Koźlice
- Village
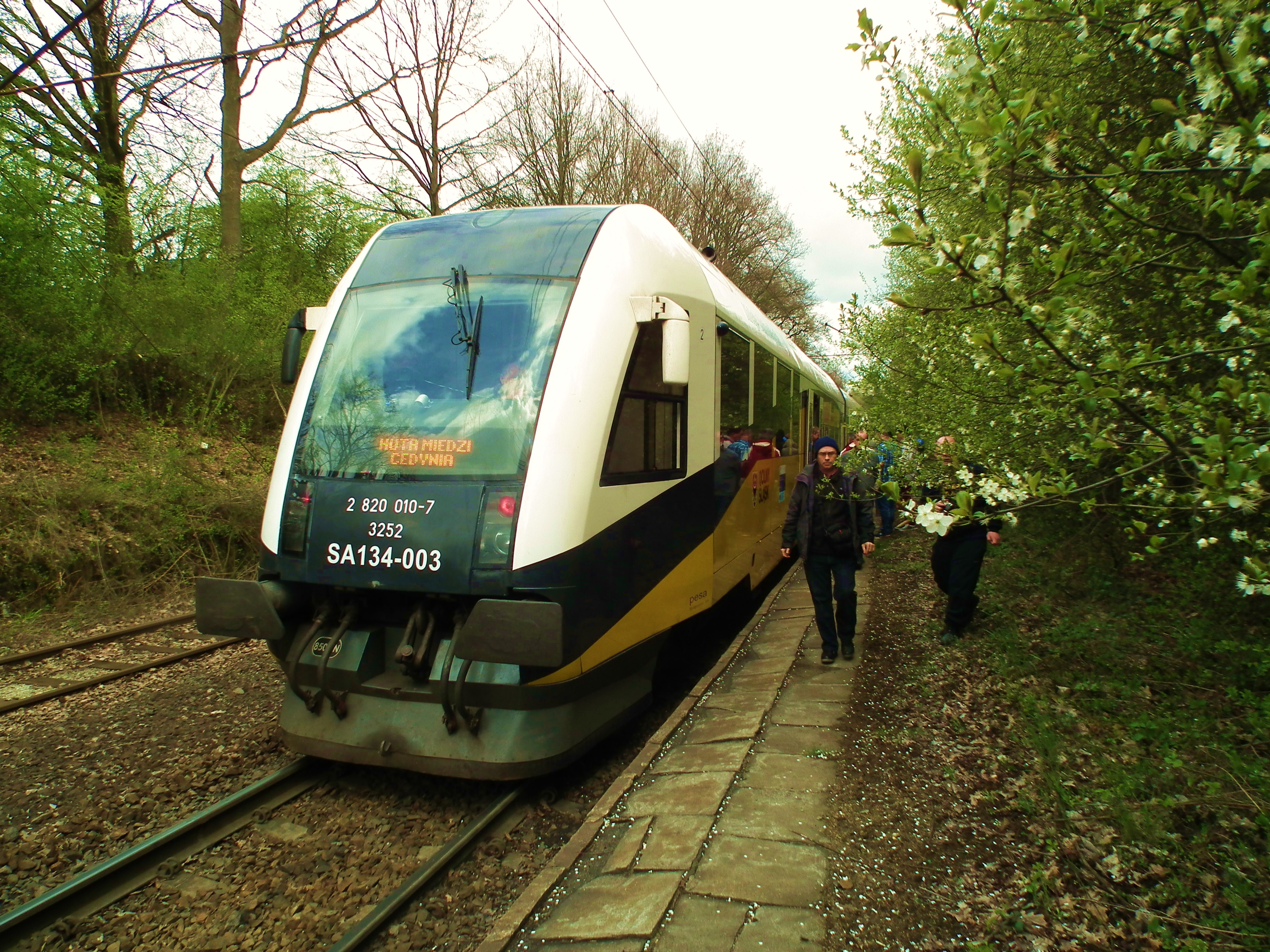
- Railway in Koźlice

- Location within Poland
- Coordinates: 51°27′06″N 16°13′56″E
- Country: Poland
- Voivodeship: Lower Silesian
- County: Lubin
- Gmina: Rudna
- Time zone: UTC+1 (CET)
  - Summer (DST): UTC+2 (CEST)
- Vehicle registration: OGL

Koźlice [kɔˈʑlit͡sɛ] is a village in the administrative district of Gmina Rudna, within Lubin County, Lower Silesian Voivodeship, in south-western Poland.

The name of the village is of Polish origin and comes from the word koza, which means "goat".
