= Bytków, Lower Silesian Voivodeship =

Bytków
- Village
- Location within Poland
- Coordinates: 51°32′07″N 16°15′33″E
- Country: Poland
- Voivodeship: Lower Silesian
- County: Lubin
- Gmina: Rudna
- Population: 30 (2,011)

Bytków [ˈbɨtkuf] is a village in the administrative district of Gmina Rudna, within Lubin County, Lower Silesian Voivodeship, in south-western Poland. It is the smallest village in the administrative district of Gmina Rudna.
