= Miłogoszcz, Lower Silesian Voivodeship =

Miłogoszcz
- Village
- Location within Poland
- Coordinates: 51°31′09″N 16°21′51″E
- Country: Poland
- Voivodeship: Lower Silesian
- County: Lubin
- Gmina: Rudna

Miłogoszcz [miˈwɔɡɔʂt͡ʂ] is a village in the administrative district of Gmina Rudna, within Lubin County, Lower Silesian Voivodeship, in south-western Poland.
