= Kostki, Pomeranian Voivodeship =

Kostki
- Settlement
- Location within Poland
- Coordinates: 54°6′36″N 17°32′49″E
- Country: Poland
- Voivodeship: Pomeranian
- County: Bytów
- Gmina: Studzienice

Kostki [ˈkɔstki] is a settlement in the administrative district of Gmina Studzienice, within Bytów County, Pomeranian Voivodeship, in northern Poland.

For details of the history of the region, see History of Pomerania.
