= Stara Rudna =

- Village
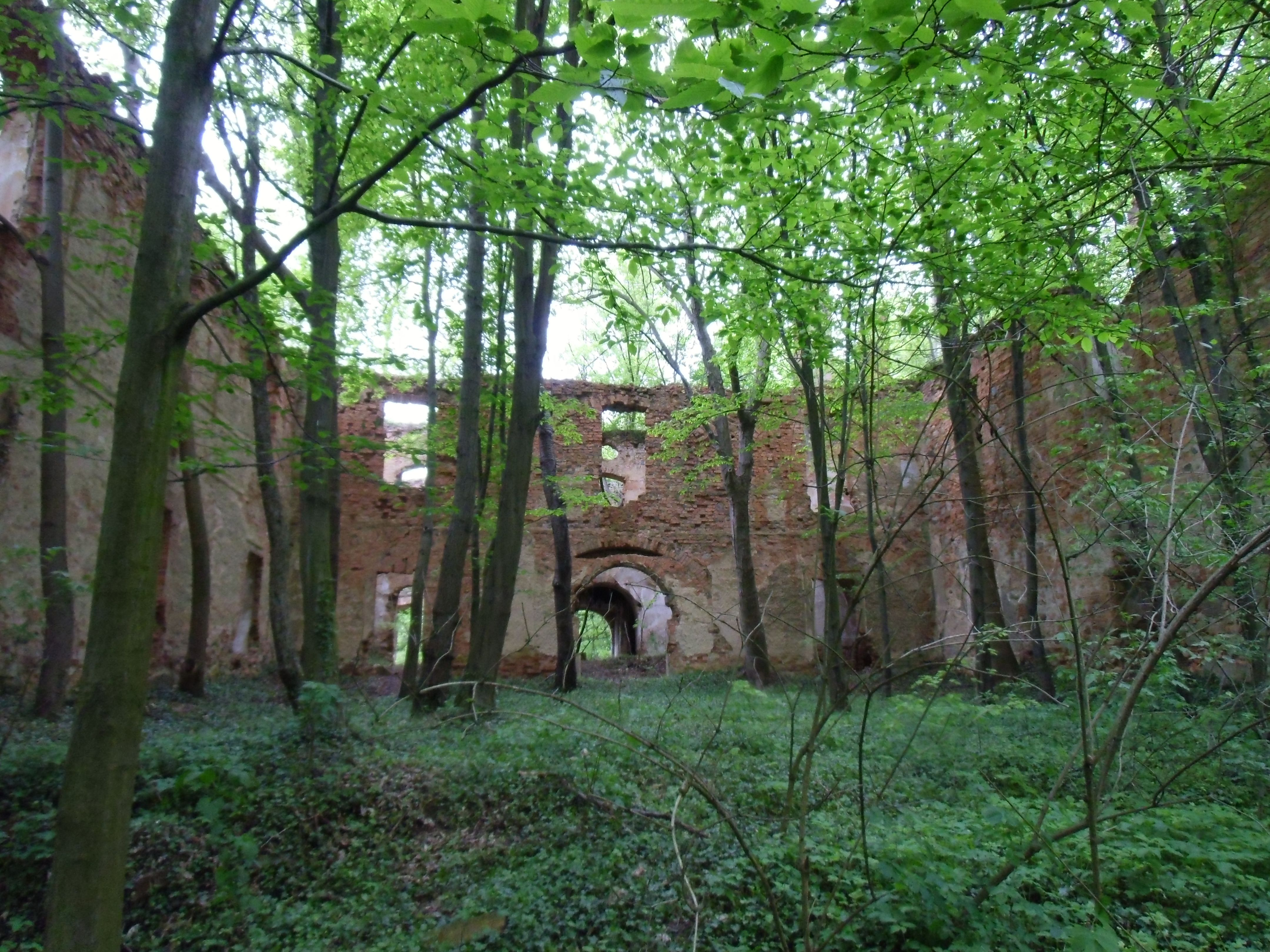
- Former palace

- Location within Poland
- Coordinates: 51°29′29″N 16°16′58″E
- Country: Poland
- Voivodeship: Lower Silesian
- County: Lubin
- Gmina: Rudna
- Elevation: 130 m (430 ft)
- Population: 140
- Time zone: UTC+1 (CET)
  - Summer (DST): UTC+2 (CEST)
- Vehicle registration: DLU

Stara Rudna [ˈstara ˈrudna] is a village in the administrative district of Gmina Rudna, within Lubin County, Lower Silesian Voivodeship, in south-western Poland.

The place, originally called Ruda, may have developed out of a medieval Polish castle and a church built in approximately 1100 by Piotr Włostowic of Dunin, though no documents are saved.

Christian Knorr von Rosenroth, a Christian Hebraist, was born here in 1631.
