= Studzienice, Bytów County =

Studzienice
- Village
- Location within Poland
- Coordinates: 54°05′32″N 17°34′32″E
- Country: Poland
- Voivodeship: Pomeranian
- County: Bytów
- Gmina: Studzienice
- Population: 816
- Time zone: UTC+1 (CET)
  - Summer (DST): UTC+2 (CEST)
- Website: http://www.studzienice.pl/

Studzienice [stud͡ʑɛˈnit͡sɛ] (Kashubian: Stëdzińce, German: Stüdnitz) is a village in Bytów County, Pomeranian Voivodeship, in northern Poland. It is the seat of the administrative district called Gmina Studzienice. The village lies approximately 6 kilometres (4 mi) south-east of Bytów and 76 km (47 mi) south-west of the regional capital Gdańsk. It is located within the historic region of Pomerania.

Studzienice was a private village, owned by various local Kashubian nobles. It remained under the suzerainty of Poland, held by the Duchy of Pomerania, until 1637, afterwards it was directly under Polish rule as part of the Pomeranian Voivodeship, and after 1657 it was a Polish fief again, held by Brandenburg-Prussia, and annexed by the Kingdom of Prussia after the First Partition of Poland in 1772. From 1871 it was also part of Germany. During World War II the German administration operated a labor camp for prisoners of war from the Stalag II-B prisoner-of-war camp in the village. After the defeat of Nazi Germany in World War II, in 1945, the village became again part of Poland.

== Sport ==
Competing in the Liga okręgowa, the village’s football club Kaszubia Studzienice was established in 1978.
