= Róg, Pomeranian Voivodeship =

Róg
- Settlement
- Location within Poland
- Coordinates: 54°6′46″N 17°38′51″E
- Country: Poland
- Voivodeship: Pomeranian
- County: Bytów
- Gmina: Studzienice
- Population: 5

Róg [ruk] is a settlement in the administrative district of Gmina Studzienice, within Bytów County, Pomeranian Voivodeship, in northern Poland.

For details of the history of the region, see History of Pomerania.
