= Gogołowice =

Gogołowice may refer to the following places in Poland:

- Gogołowice in Gmina Lubin, Lubin County in Lower Silesian Voivodeship (SW Poland)
- Gogołowice in Gmina Milicz, Milicz County in Lower Silesian Voivodeship (SW Poland)
