= Łazek =

- Part of Village
- Location within Poland
- Coordinates: 51°21′N 16°17′E
- Country: Poland
- Voivodeship: Lower Silesian
- County: Lubin
- Gmina: Lubin

Łazek [ˈwazɛk] is a part of village Niemstów in the administrative district of Gmina Lubin, within Lubin County, Lower Silesian Voivodeship, in south-western Poland.
