= Krzeczyn Wielki =

- Village
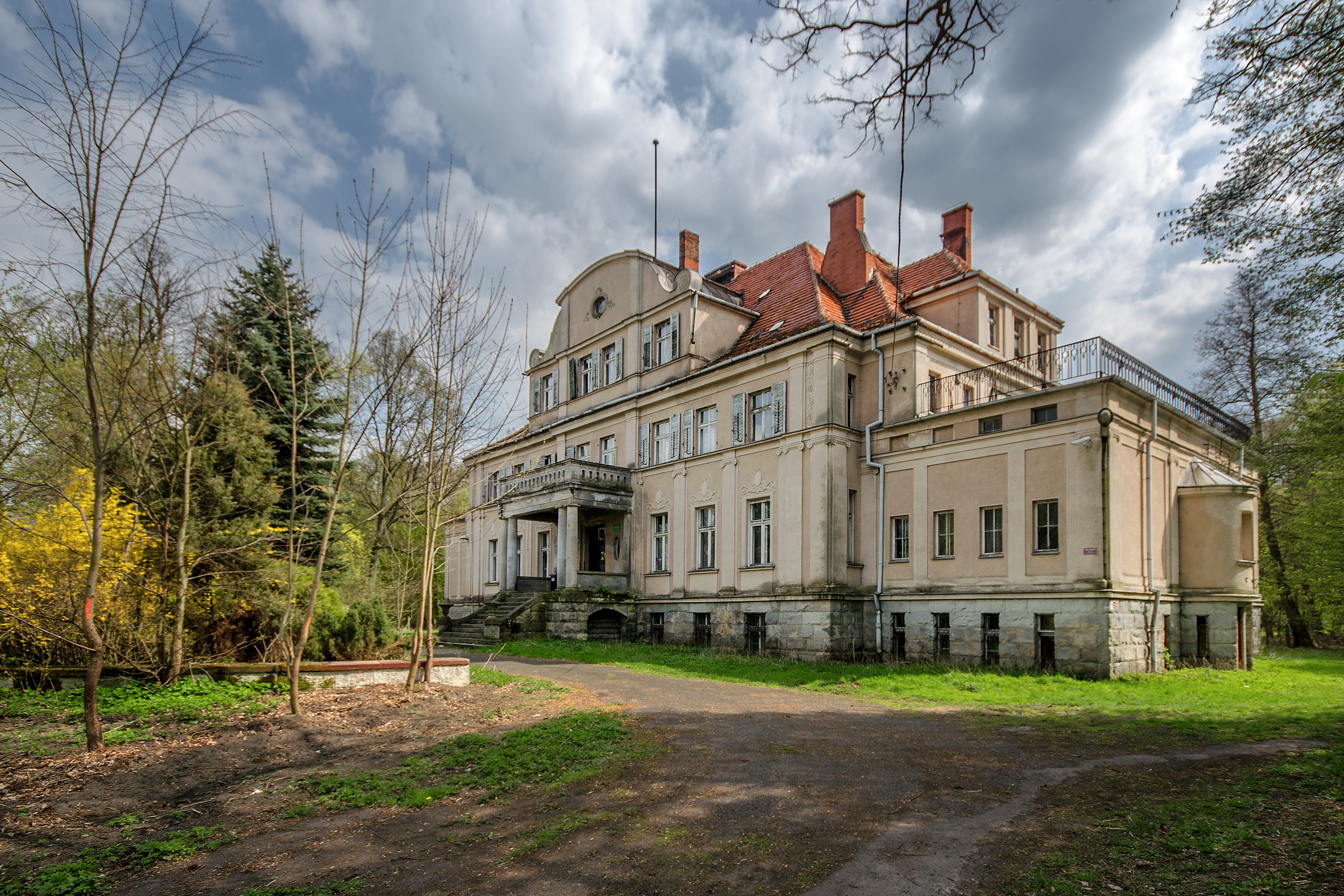
- Palace in the village

- Location within Poland
- Coordinates: 51°22′27″N 16°08′20″E
- Country: Poland
- Voivodeship: Lower Silesian
- County: Lubin
- Gmina: Lubin
- Time zone: UTC+1 (CET)
  - Summer (DST): UTC+2 (CEST)
- Area code: 76
- Vehicle registration: DLU

Krzeczyn Wielki (Polish pronunciation: [ˈkʂɛtʂɨn ˈvjɛlkʲi]) is a village in the administrative district of Gmina Lubin, within Lubin County, Lower Silesian Voivodeship, in south-western Poland. The appendix Wielki (Great) serves to distinguish the place from neighbouring Krzeczyn Mały (Little Krzeczyn).

== History ==
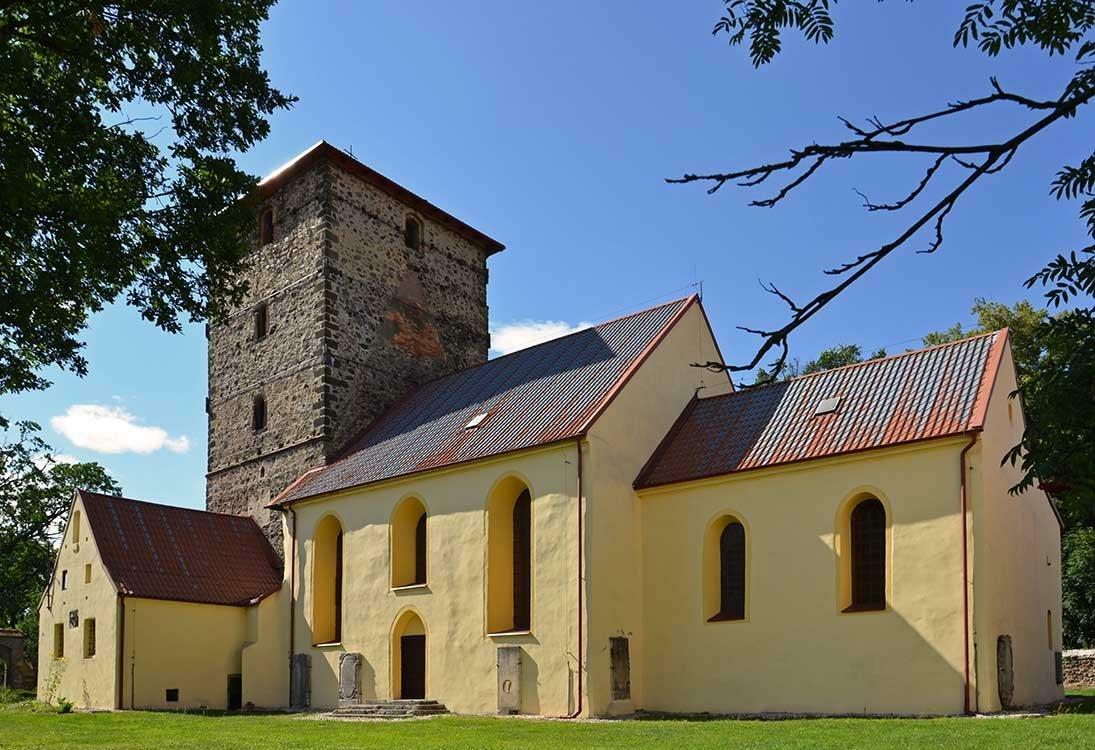
Church of Saint Maria Dominica Mazzarello

The village in the historic Lower Silesia region was first mentioned as Old Polish Chrechim in a 1267 deed issued by Pope Clement IV, concerning the grant of tithes to monks of Trzebnica Abbey. Then part of the Duchy of Legnica, German peasants and craftsmen from about 1280 settled here under the German town law of neighbouring Lubin in the course of the Ostsiedlung migration, invited by the ruling Silesian dukes of the Piast dynasty. The parish church, nowadays dedicated to St Maria Domenica Mazzarello, was erected in the 14th century.

In the 18th century, the village was annexed by Prussia, and from 1871 it was also part of Germany. The manor house with its park and a linden avenue was rebuilt in 1914–16 on foundation walls dating from the 17th century. Until World War II it served as the residence of local Junker landowners. After the war, as a result of the implementation of the Oder–Neisse line according to the 1945 Potsdam Agreement, Krzeczyn Wielki became again part of Poland. The German-speaking population was expelled in accordance with the Potsdam Agreement and Poles were settled here, who themselves had been expelled from areas annexed by the Soviet Union. From 1975 to 1998 the village belonged to Legnica Voivodeship.

== See also ==
- Krzeczyn
