= Bukowna =

- Village
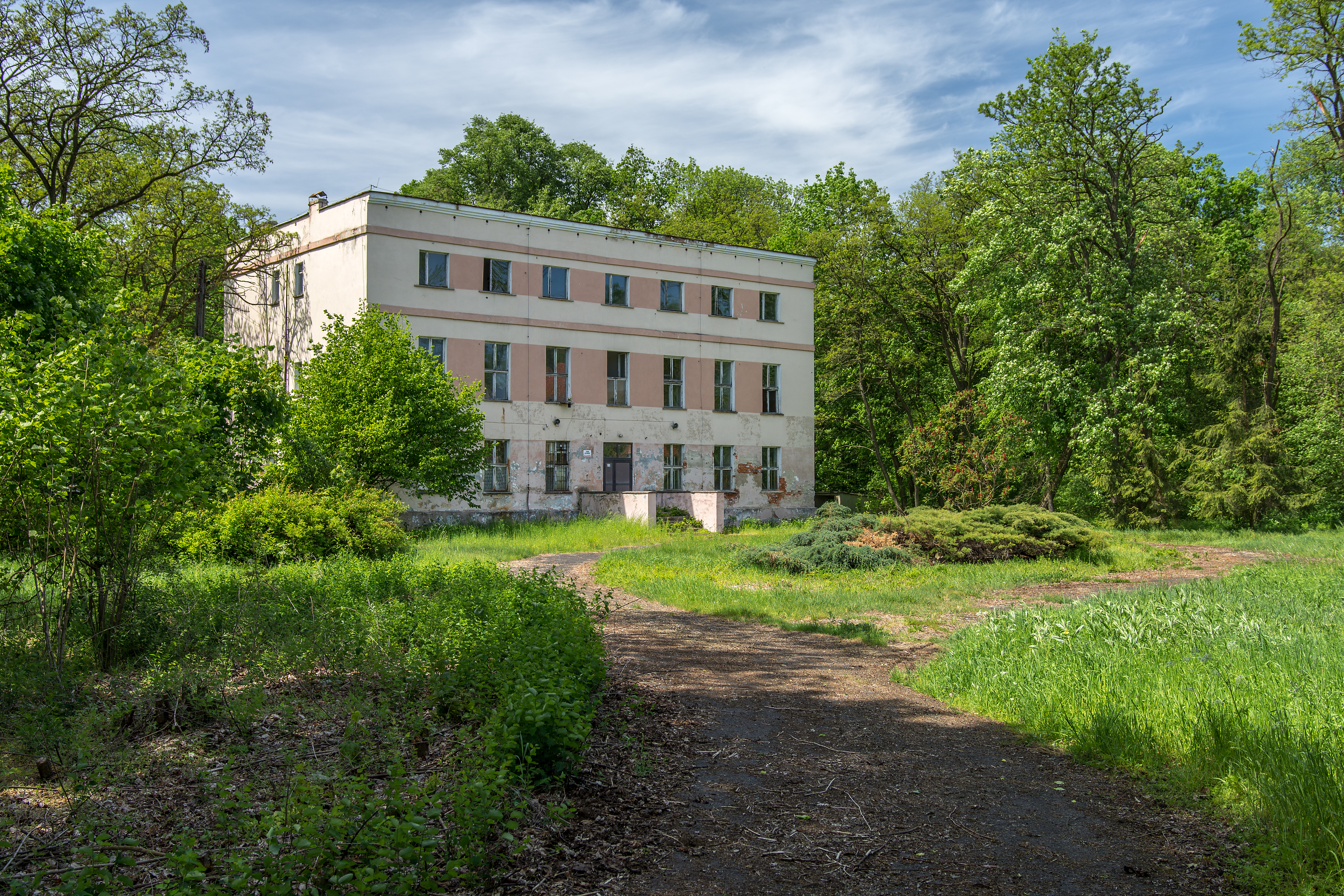
- Palace

- Location within Poland
- Coordinates: 51°18′28″N 16°02′53″E
- Country: Poland
- Voivodeship: Lower Silesian
- County: Lubin
- Gmina: Lubin

Bukowna [buˈkɔvna] is a village in the administrative district of Gmina Lubin, within Lubin County, Lower Silesian Voivodeship, in south-western Poland.
