= Miroszowice =

- Village
- Location within Poland
- Coordinates: 51°23′16″N 16°13′46″E
- Country: Poland
- Voivodeship: Lower Silesian
- County: Lubin
- Gmina: Lubin

Miroszowice [mirɔʂɔˈvit͡sɛ] is a village in the administrative district of Gmina Lubin, within Lubin County, Lower Silesian Voivodeship, in south-western Poland.

The village was first mentioned in Old Polish as Micosivici in a 1267 deed.
