= Dąbrowa Górna, Lower Silesian Voivodeship =

Dąbrowa Górna
- Village
- Location within Poland
- Coordinates: 51°25′19″N 16°18′32″E
- Country: Poland
- Voivodeship: Lower Silesian
- County: Lubin
- Gmina: Lubin

Dąbrowa Górna [dɔmˈbrɔva ˈɡurna] is a village in the administrative district of Gmina Lubin, within Lubin County, Lower Silesian Voivodeship, in south-western Poland.
