= Księginice, Lubin County =

Księginice
- Village
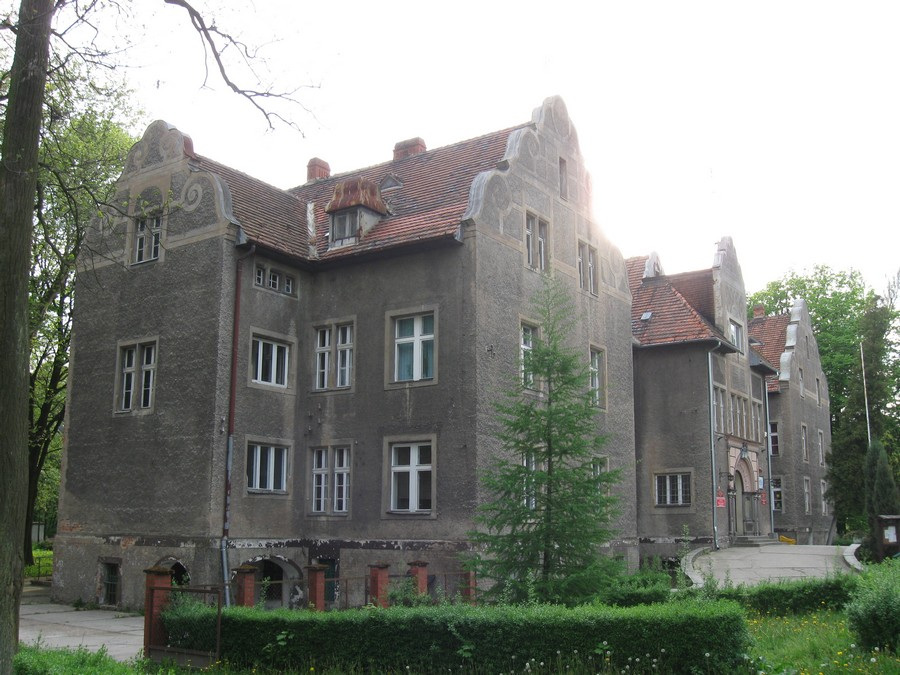
- Palace in Księginice

- Location within Poland
- Coordinates: 51°24′32″N 16°15′59″E
- Country: Poland
- Voivodeship: Lower Silesian
- County: Lubin
- Gmina: Lubin

Księginice [kɕɛnɡiˈnit͡sɛ] is a village in the administrative district of Gmina Lubin, within Lubin County, Lower Silesian Voivodeship, in south-western Poland.
