= Obora, Lower Silesian Voivodeship =

Obora
- Village
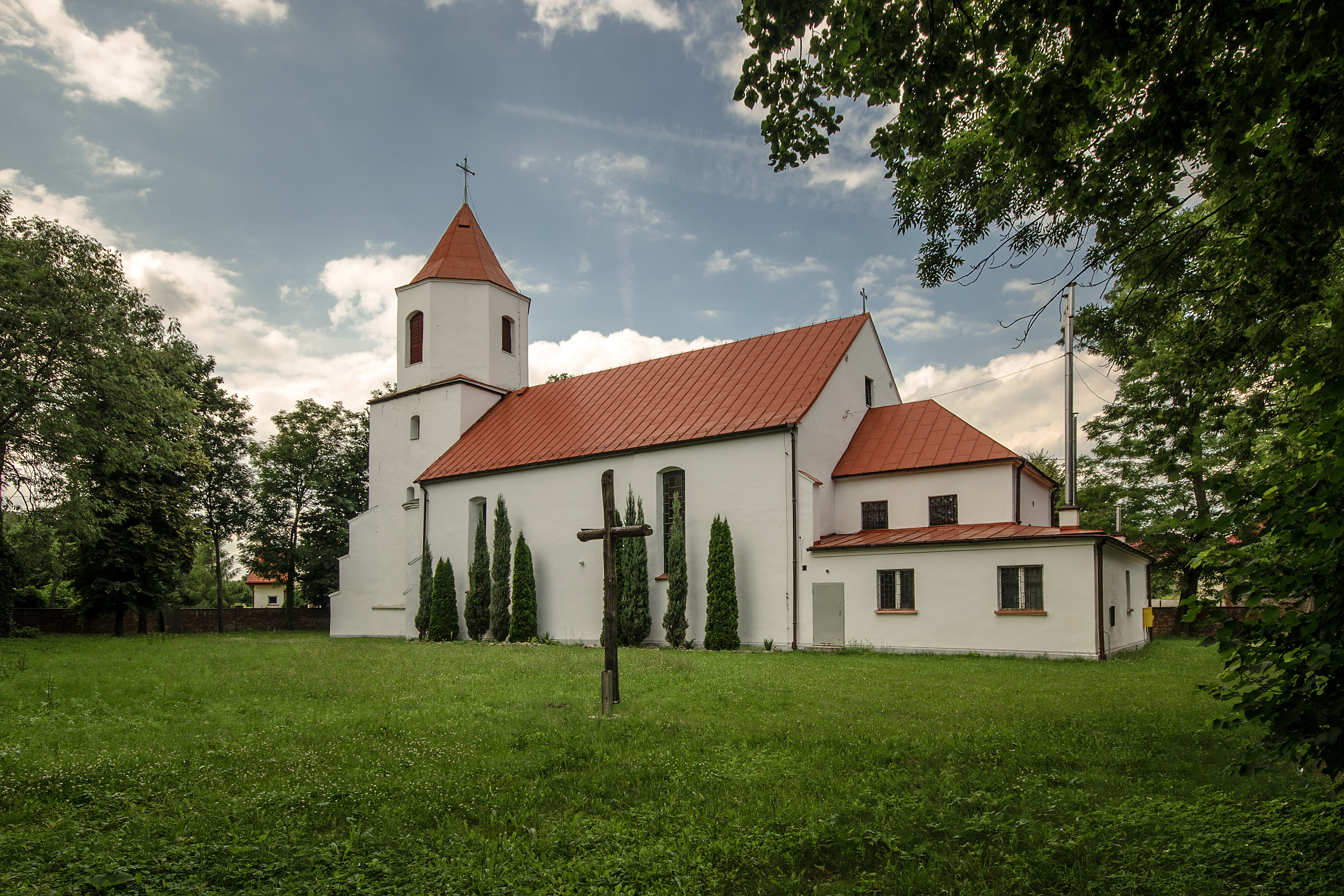
- Church of Saint Anthony

- Location within Poland
- Coordinates: 51°25′06″N 16°08′17″E
- Country: Poland
- Voivodeship: Lower Silesian
- County: Lubin
- Gmina: Lubin

Population
  - Total: 872
- Time zone: UTC+1 (CET)
  - Summer (DST): UTC+2 (CEST)
- Vehicle registration: DLU

Obora [ɔˈbɔra] is a village in the administrative district of Gmina Lubin, within Lubin County, Lower Silesian Voivodeship, in south-western Poland.
