= Raszowa Mała =

- Village
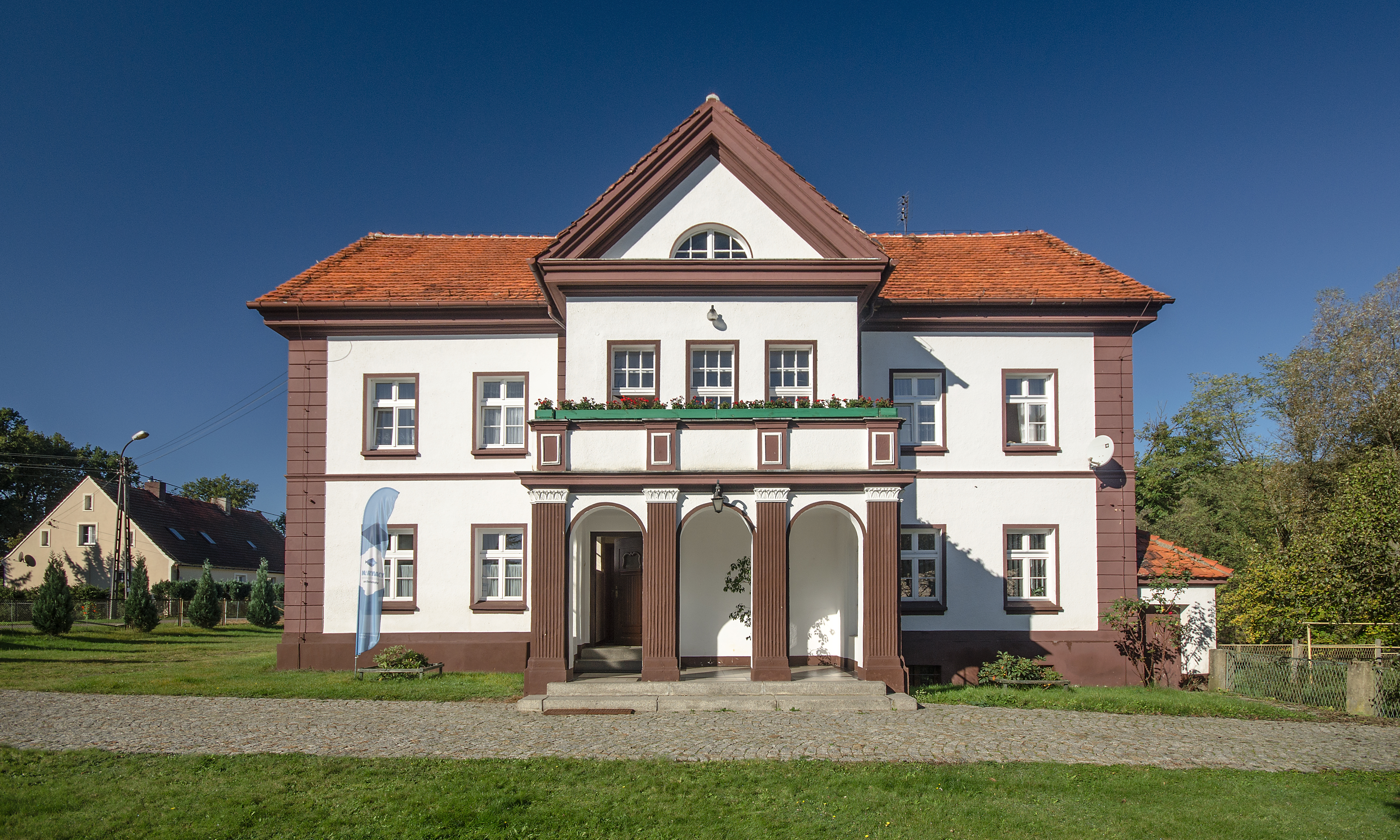
- Manor

- Location within Poland
- Coordinates: 51°18′17″N 16°13′21″E
- Country: Poland
- Voivodeship: Lower Silesian
- County: Lubin
- Gmina: Lubin

Raszowa Mała [raˈʂɔva ˈmawa] is a village in the administrative district of Gmina Lubin, within Lubin County, Lower Silesian Voivodeship, in south-western Poland.
