= Osiek, Lubin County =

Osiek
- Village
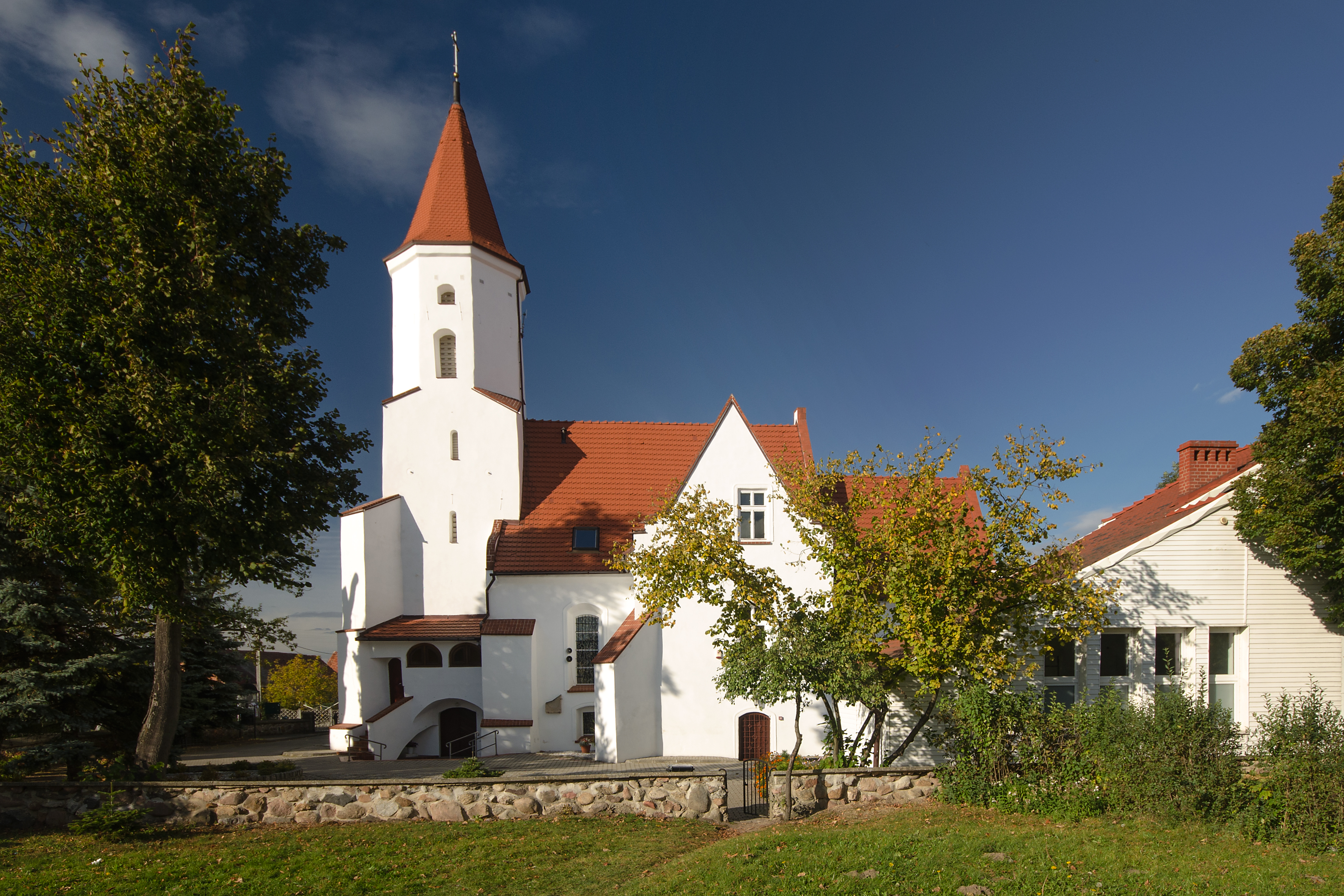
- Christ the King church in Osiek

- Location within Poland
- Coordinates: 51°22′N 16°14′E
- Country: Poland
- Voivodeship: Lower Silesian
- County: Lubin
- Gmina: Lubin

Population (approx.)
  - Total: 1,000
- Time zone: UTC+1 (CET)
  - Summer (DST): UTC+2 (CEST)
- Vehicle registration: DLU

Osiek [ˈɔɕɛk] is a village in the administrative district of Gmina Lubin, within Lubin County, Lower Silesian Voivodeship, in south-western Poland.

== Notable people ==
- Caspar Schwenckfeld (1489/90–1561), German theologian, writer, and preacher
