= Składowice =

- Village
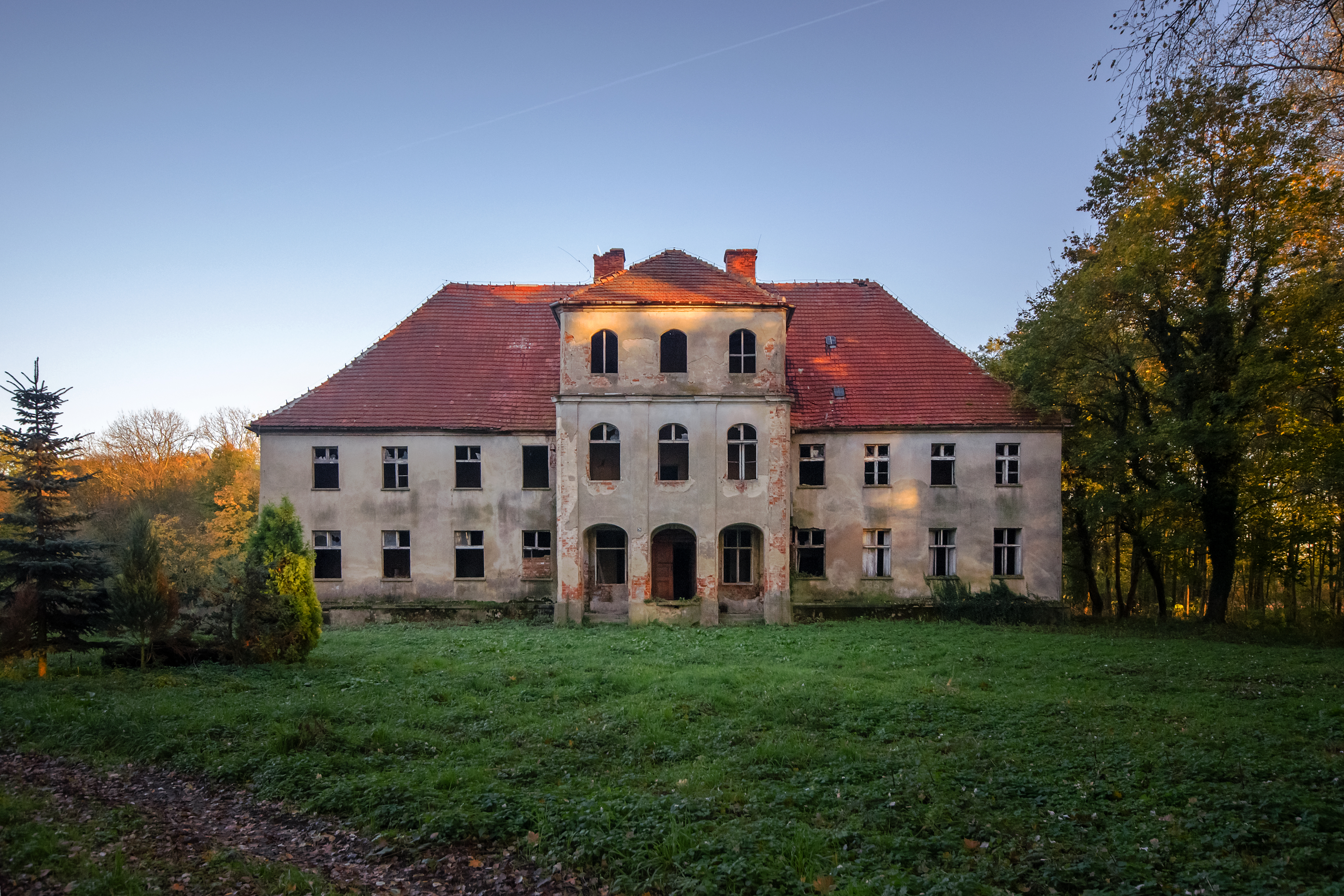
- Palace

- Location within Poland
- Coordinates: 51°26′N 16°16′E
- Country: Poland
- Voivodeship: Lower Silesian
- County: Lubin
- Gmina: Lubin
- Time zone: UTC+1 (CET)
  - Summer (DST): UTC+2 (CEST)
- Vehicle registration: DLU

Składowice [skwadɔˈvit͡sɛ] is a village in the administrative district of Gmina Lubin, within Lubin County, Lower Silesian Voivodeship, in south-western Poland.

== Notable people ==
- Jan Jonston (1603–c. 1675), Polish scholar, botanist, physician
