= Lisiec, Lower Silesian Voivodeship =

Lisiec
- Village
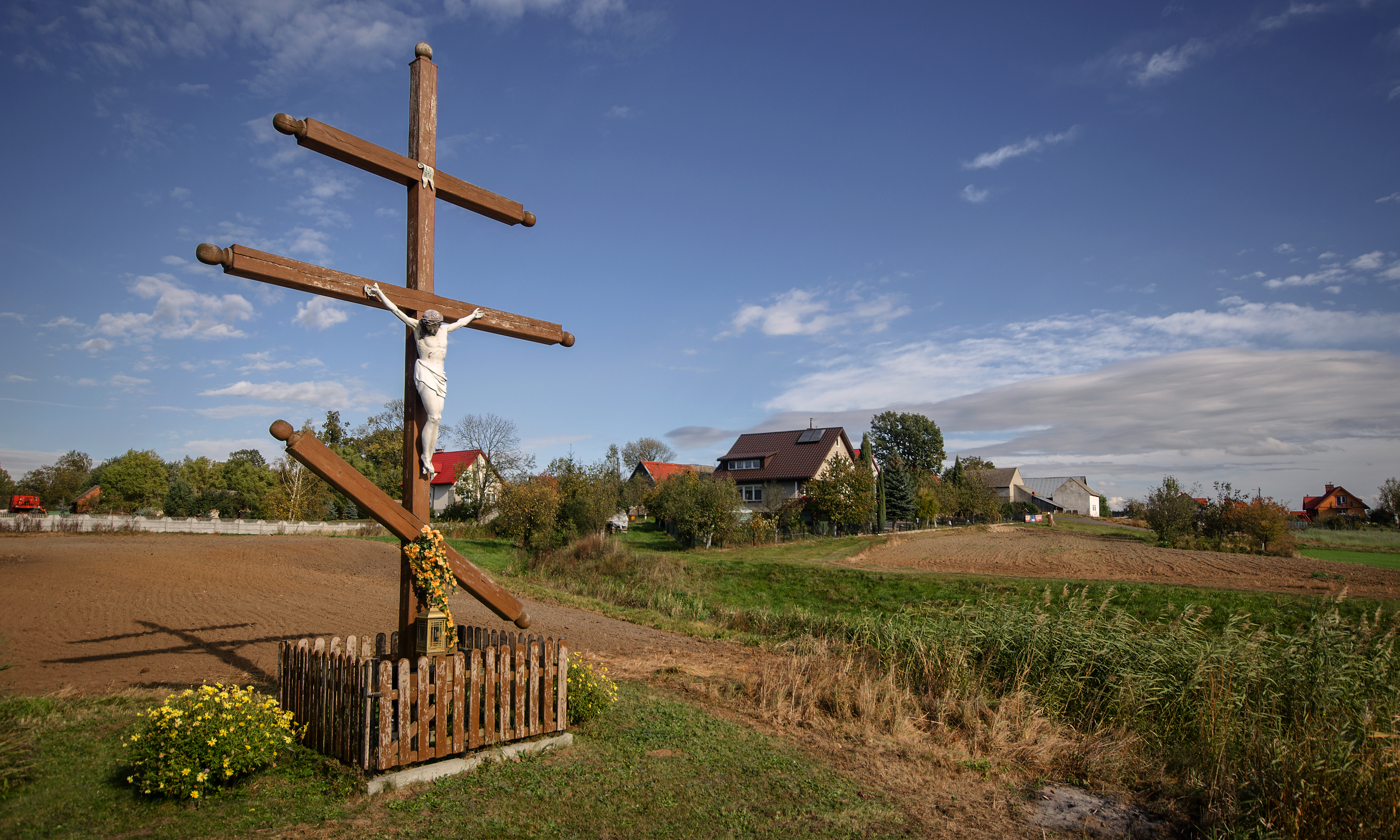
- A chapel in Lisiec, Lower Silesian Voivodeship

- Location within Poland
- Coordinates: 51°19′36″N 16°02′43″E
- Country: Poland
- Voivodeship: Lower Silesian
- County: Lubin
- Gmina: Lubin

Lisiec (Polish pronunciation: [ˈliɕɛts]) is a village in the administrative district of Gmina Lubin, within Lubin County, Lower Silesian Voivodeship, in southwestern Poland.
