= Szklary Górne =

- Village
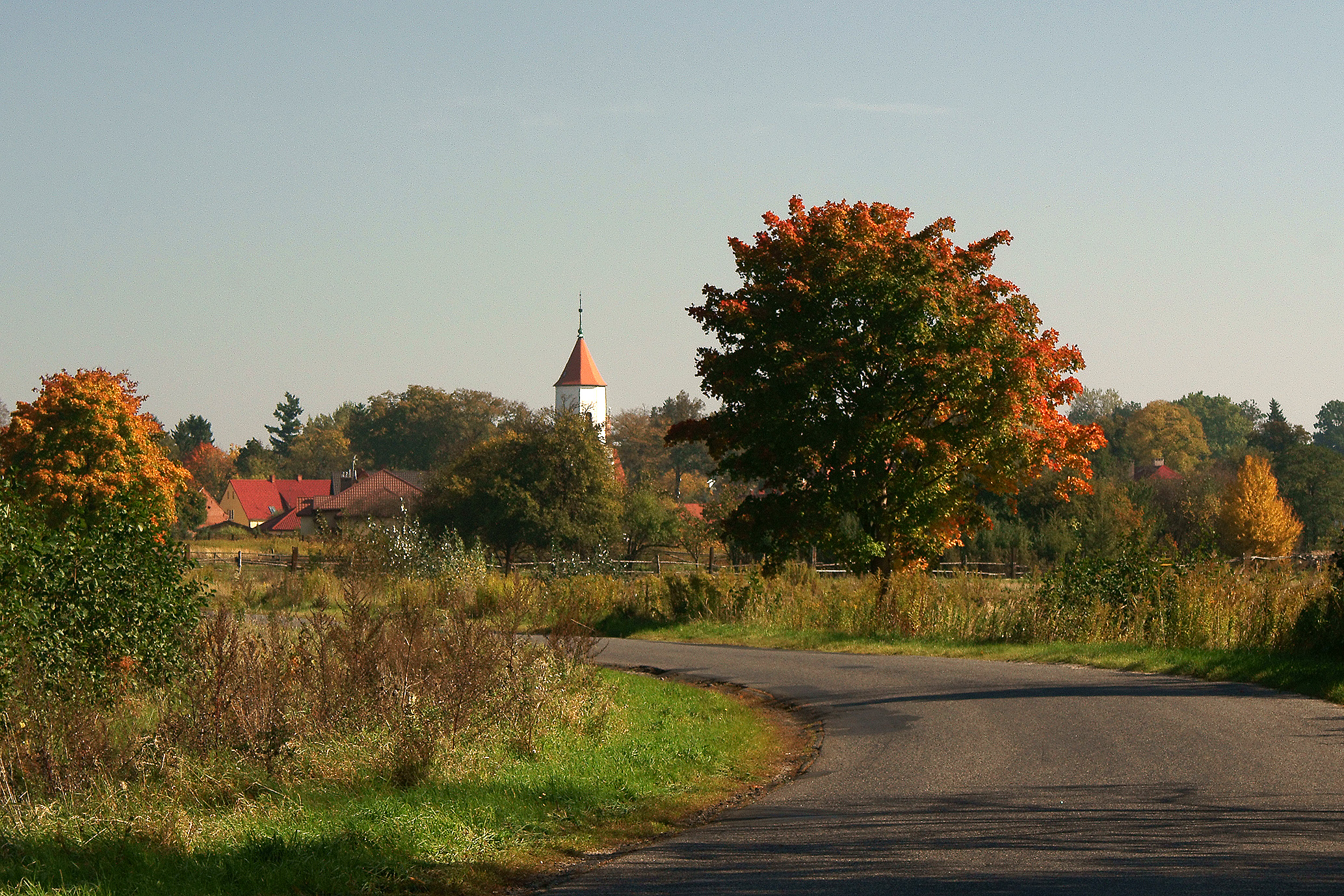

- Location within Poland
- Coordinates: 51°26′N 16°5′E
- Country: Poland
- Voivodeship: Lower Silesian
- County: Lubin
- Gmina: Lubin

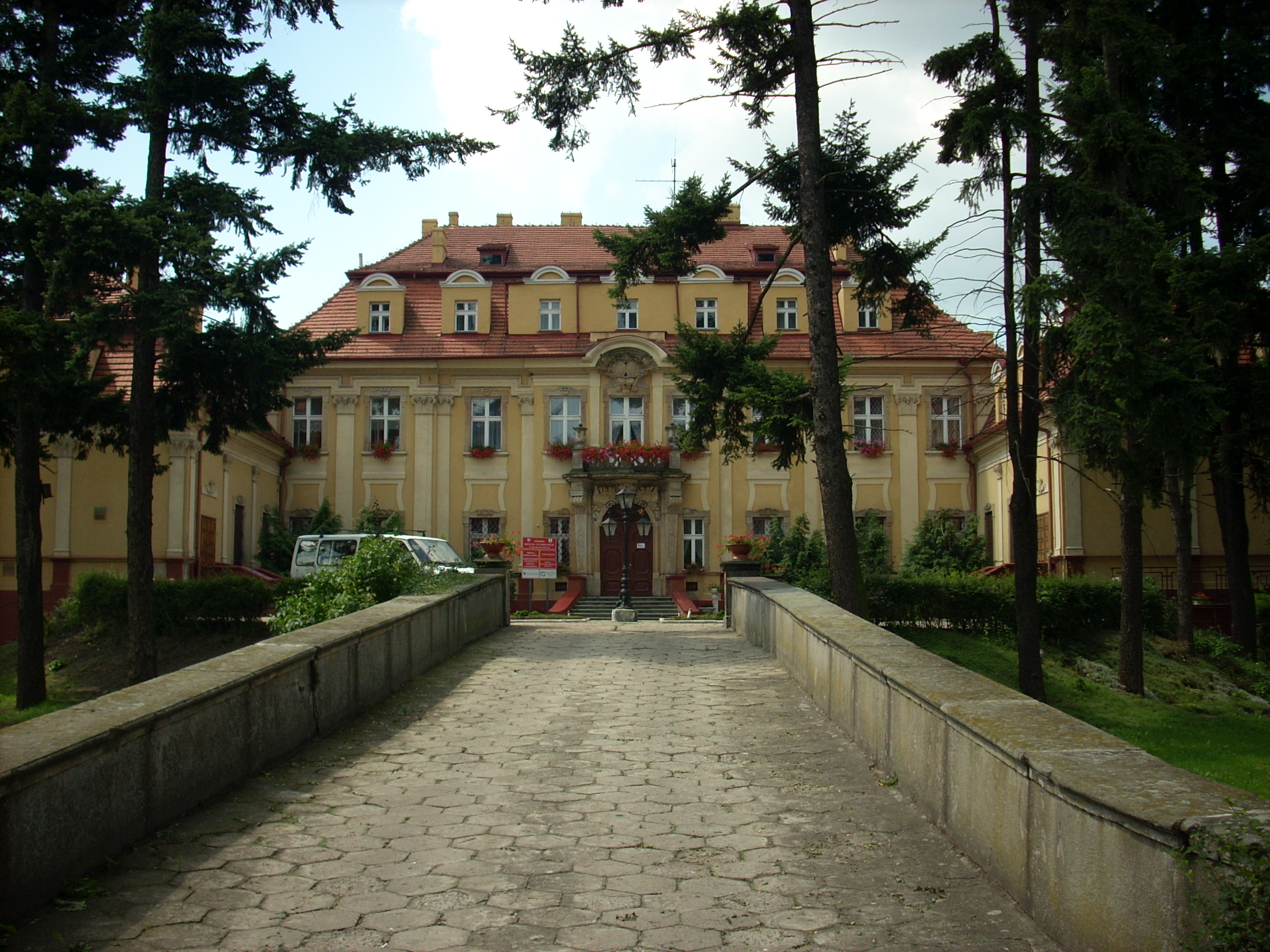
Palace Ober Gläsersdorf

Szklary Górne [ˈʂklarɨ ˈɡurnɛ] is a village in the administrative district of Gmina Lubin, within Lubin County, Lower Silesian Voivodeship, in south-western Poland.
