= Zdzisław Wąsik =

Polish linguist and semiotician

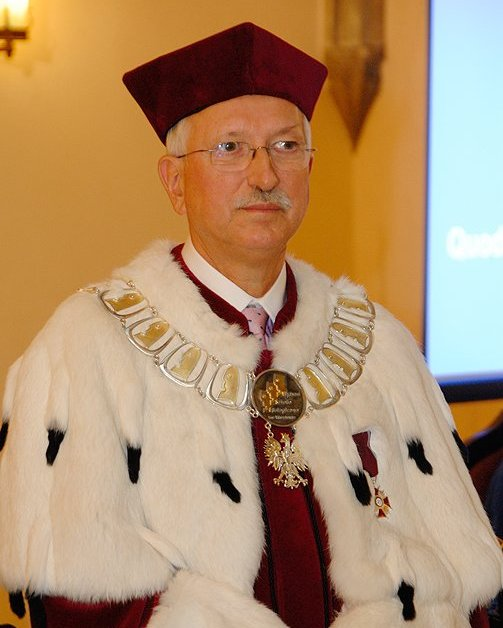
- Professor Zdzisław Wąsik; Rector Senior of Wyższa Szkoła Filologiczna
- Born: 3 May 1947 (age 78); Kłopotów, Poland
- Scientific career
- Fields: Indo-European linguistics Semiotics; Communication theory
- Institutions: Wyższa Szkoła Filologiczna; Adam Mickiewicz University

Zdzisław Wąsik (born 3 May 1947) is a Polish linguist and semiotician, Rector Senior and Professor Ordinarius at the Philological School of Higher Education in Wrocław and Professor Senior at Adam Mickiewicz University in Poznań.

== Educational career ==
He received his master's title in German (1971) and doctoral degree (1976) in comparative Indo-European linguistics from the University of Wrocław. Subsequently, he habilitated in general linguistics at the Adam Mickiewicz University in Poznań in 1986 and gained his scientific title of Professor of Humanistic Sciences from the President of the Republic of Poland in 1997.

== Academic positions ==
In his first position, he served for 14 years (1984–1999) as Head of the Department of General Linguistics at the University of Wrocław and, between 2002 and 2010, as Head of the Department of Semiotics in the School of English at the Adam Mickiewicz University in Poznań.

He directed the Department of English Linguistics in the Institute of English Philology of the Pedagogical School of Higher Education in Opole (currently Opole University) (1991–1992), Department of Linguistics of the State Vocational School of Higher Education in Wałbrzych (2000–2004), Department of English of the Nicolaus Copernicus University in Toruń (2001–2006).
