= Bolanów =

- Village
- Location within Poland
- Coordinates: 51°21′13″N 16°5′32″E
- Country: Poland
- Voivodeship: Lower Silesian
- County: Lubin
- Gmina: Lubin

Bolanów [bɔˈlanuf] is a village in the administrative district of Gmina Lubin, within Lubin County, Lower Silesian Voivodeship, in south-western Poland.
