= Podgórze, Lubin County =

Podgórze
- Village
- Location within Poland
- Coordinates: 51°20′40″N 16°16′21″E
- Country: Poland
- Voivodeship: Lower Silesian
- County: Lubin
- Gmina: Lubin

Podgórze [pɔdˈɡuʐɛ] is a village in the administrative district of Gmina Lubin, within Lubin County, Lower Silesian Voivodeship, in south-western Poland.
