= Buczynka =

- Village
- Location within Poland
- Coordinates: 51°17′53″N 16°15′53″E
- Country: Poland
- Voivodeship: Lower Silesian
- County: Lubin
- Gmina: Lubin

Buczynka [buˈt͡ʂɨnka] is a village in the administrative district of Gmina Lubin, within Lubin County, Lower Silesian Voivodeship, in south-western Poland.
