= Miłosna =

Miłosna may refer to the following places in Poland:

- Miłosna, Lower Silesian Voivodeship (south-west Poland)
- Miłosna, Łódź Voivodeship (central Poland)
- Miłosna, Warmian-Masurian Voivodeship (north Poland)
