= Karl Julius Beloch =

German classical and economic historian (1854–1929)

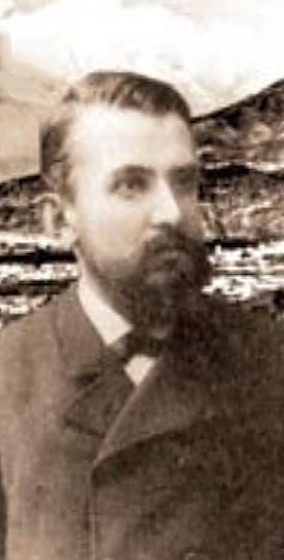
Karl Julius Beloch

Karl Julius Beloch (21 January 1854 – 1 February 1929) was a German classical and economic historian.

== Biography ==
Born Nieder-Petschkendorf on 21 January 1854, from 1872 to 1875 he studied classical philology and ancient history in Freiburg, Heidelberg and Rome, obtaining his PhD from the University of Rome in 1875 (thesis Sulla costituzione politica dell'Elide). In 1879 he became an associate professor at Rome, where, from 1891 to 1912, he served as a full professor of ancient history. In 1912/13, he was a professor of ancient history at the University of Leipzig.

Beloch is known for his critical examinations of classical Greek and Roman history. He was skeptical of traditional sources, and frequently presented a new and subjective reconstruction of historical events. These historical beliefs placed him out of favor with several influential German scholars, particularly the famed historian Theodor Mommsen (1817–1903). In 1889 Beloch was denied professorship at Breslau, a position that had been vacated by Eduard Meyer (1855–1930), and instead given to Ulrich Wilcken (1862–1944). His daughter Margherita Beloch Piazzolla was a mathematics professor in Ferrara.

Among his numerous publications were a four-volume opus of Greek history titled Griechische Geschichte, and a systematic study involving the demography of the Greco-Roman world called Die Bevölkerung der griechisch-römischen Welt.

He died on 1 February 1929 in Rome.

== Selected works ==
- Das italische Bund unter Roms Hegemonie; staatsrechtliche und statistische Forschungen (26 editions published between 1880 and 1964 in three languages) – The Italic covenant of Rome's hegemony: constitutional and statistical research.
- Die attische Politik seit Perikles (34 editions published between 1884 and 1968 in German and English) – Athenian politics since Pericles.
- Campanien : Geschichte und Topographie des antiken Neapel und seiner Umgebung (25 editions published between 1890 and 1964 in three languages) – Campania: History and topography of ancient Naples and surrounding areas.
- Griechische Geschichte (88 editions published between 1893 and 1967 in five languages) – Greek history.
  - 1. Bd. Die Zeit vor den Perserkriegen. -- The period before the Persian wars.
  - 2. Bd. Bis auf die sophistische Bewegung und den Peloponnesischen Krieg—Up until the Sophistic movement and the Peloponnesian War.
  - 3. Bd. Bis auf Aristotles und die Eroberung Asiens. -- Prior to Aristotle and the conquest of Asia.
  - 4. Bd. Die griechische Weltherrschaft—Greek world domination.
- Die Bevölkerung der griechisch-römischen Welt (38 editions published between 1886 and 1979) – Demographics of the Greco-Roman world.
- Römische Geschichte bis zum Beginn der punischen Kriege, 1926 – Roman history up to the beginning of the Punic Wars.
- Bevölkerungsgeschichte Italiens (18 editions published between 1937 and 1961) – Italian demographic history.

== See also ==
- Classical demography
