= Zalesie, Lubin County =

Zalesie
- Village
- Location within Poland
- Coordinates: 51°26′51″N 16°15′28″E
- Country: Poland
- Voivodeship: Lower Silesian
- County: Lubin
- Gmina: Lubin

Zalesie ([zaˈlɛɕɛ]) is a village in the administrative district of Gmina Lubin, within Lubin County, Lower Silesian Voivodeship, in south-western Poland.
