= Gorzyca =

Gorzyca or Górzyca may refer to the following places in Poland:

- Gorzyca, Lower Silesian Voivodeship (south-west Poland)
- Gorzyca, Lubusz Voivodeship (west Poland)
- Górzyca, Lubusz Voivodeship (west Poland)
- Gorzyca, West Pomeranian Voivodeship (north-west Poland)
- Górzyca, West Pomeranian Voivodeship (north-west Poland)
