= Gorzelin =

- Village
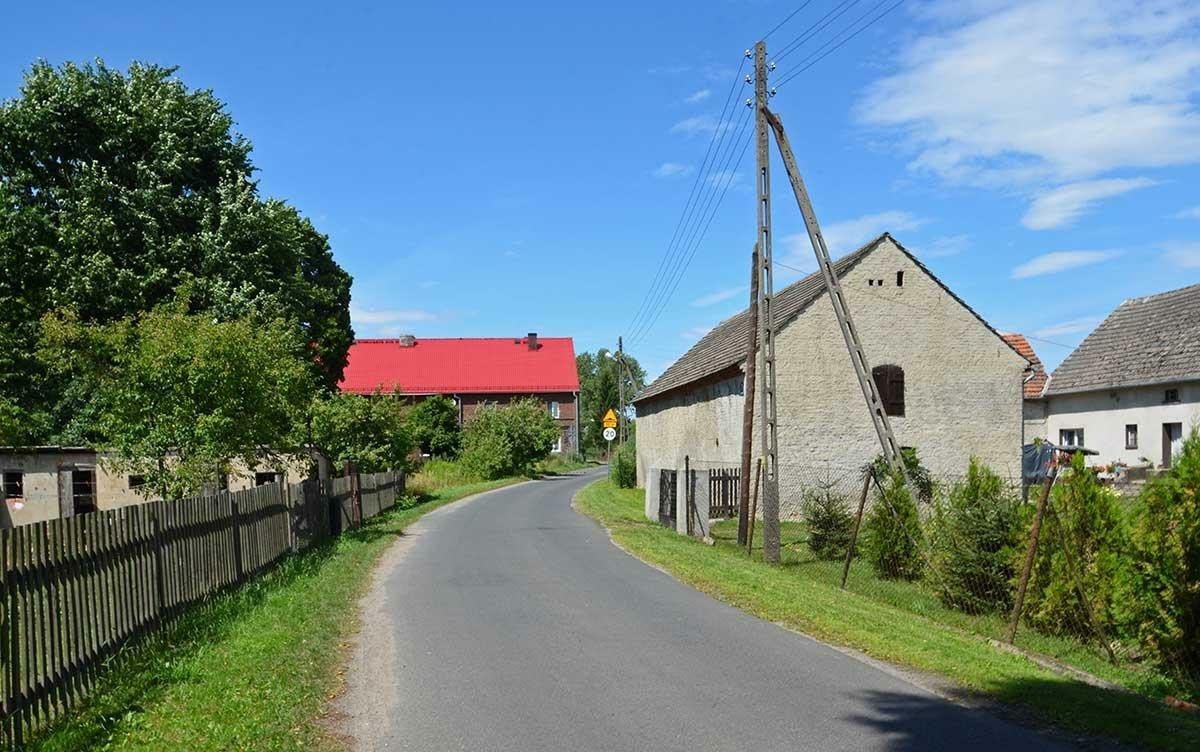

- Location within Poland
- Coordinates: 51°19′49″N 16°11′26″E
- Country: Poland
- Voivodeship: Lower Silesian
- County: Lubin
- Gmina: Lubin

Gorzelin [ɡɔˈʐɛlin] is a village in the administrative district of Gmina Lubin, within Lubin County, Lower Silesian Voivodeship, in south-western Poland.

The population is recorded at approximately 184 inhabitants according to the 2021 census.
