= Wiercień =

Wiercień may refer to the following places in Poland:

- Wiercień, Lower Silesian Voivodeship (south-west Poland)
- Wiercień, Podlaskie Voivodeship (north-east Poland)
