= Raszówka =

- Village
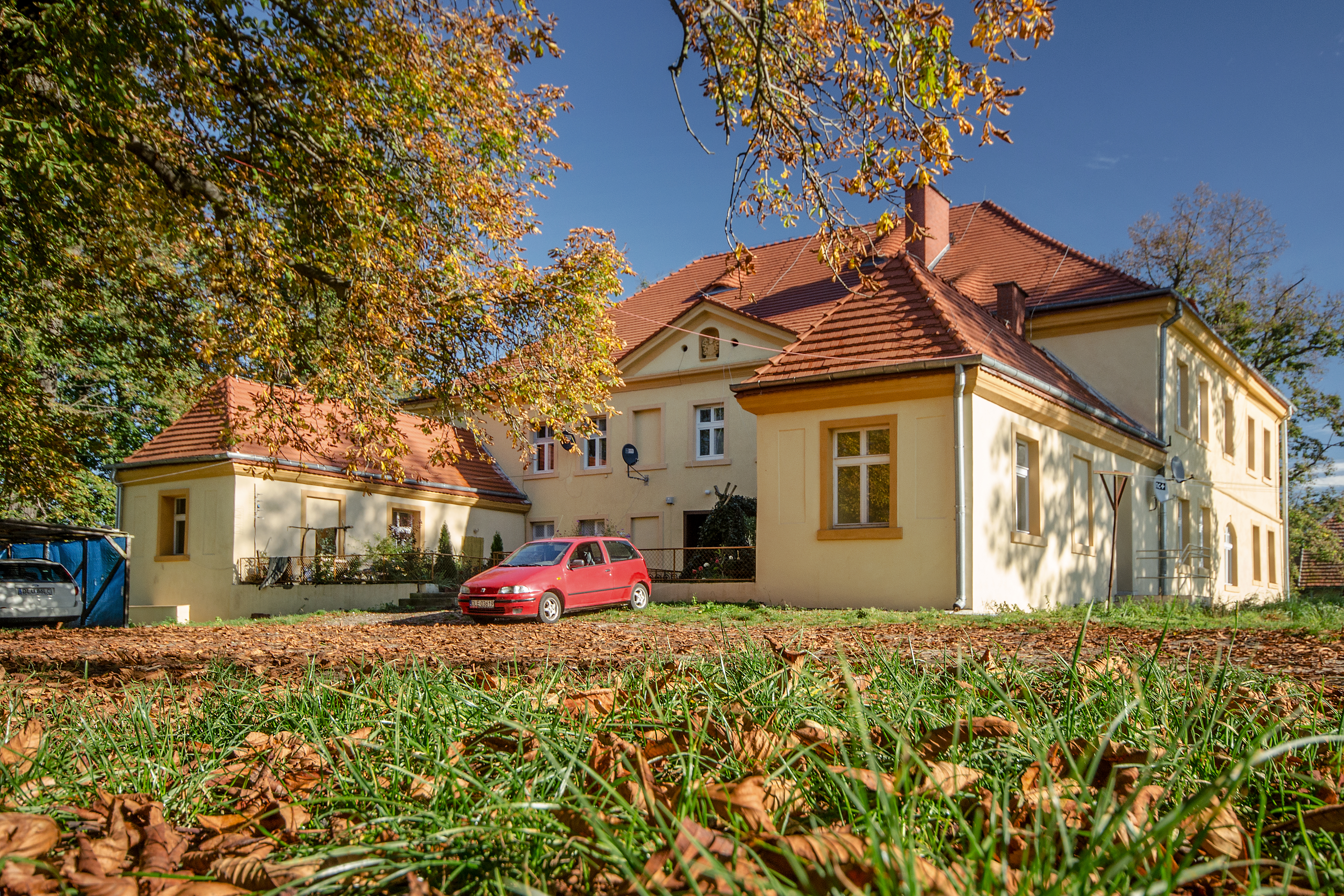
- Manor

- Location within Poland
- Coordinates: 51°18′N 16°11′E
- Country: Poland
- Voivodeship: Lower Silesian
- County: Lubin
- Gmina: Lubin
- Website: http://www.raszowka.info/

Raszówka [raˈʂufka] is a village in the administrative district of Gmina Lubin, within Lubin County, Lower Silesian Voivodeship, in south-western Poland.
