= WSF =

WSF can refer to:

- Windows Script File
- Washington Square Films, an American production and management company
- Washington State Ferries
- World Science Festival
- World Social Forum
- World Squash Federation
- World Snooker Federation
- Workers Suffrage Federation, later Workers Socialist Federation
- Women's Sport Foundation, later Women's Sport and Fitness Foundation
- World Strongman Federation
- World Shotokan Federation
- Wyższa Szkoła Filologiczna (Philological School of Higher Education), Wrocław, Poland
