= Siedlce, Lubin County =

Siedlce
- Village
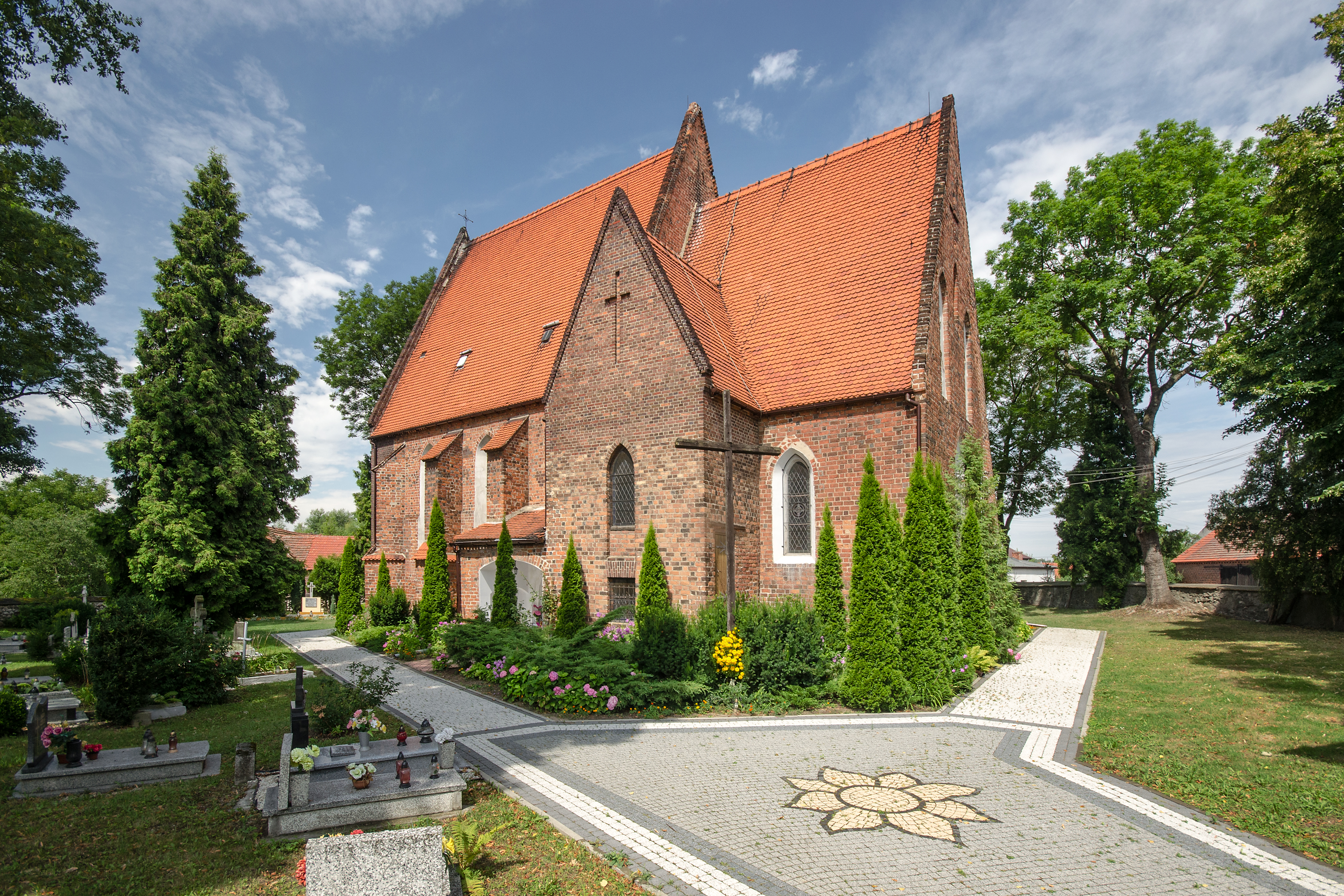
- Saint Michael Archangel church in Siedlce

- Location within Poland
- Coordinates: 51°23′47″N 16°18′27″E
- Country: Poland
- Voivodeship: Lower Silesian
- County: Lubin
- Gmina: Lubin
- Elevation: 170 m (560 ft)

Population
  - Total: 430
- Time zone: UTC+1 (CET)
  - Summer (DST): UTC+2 (CEST)
- Vehicle registration: DLU
- Website: http://www.siedlce.lubin.pl

Siedlce [ˈɕɛdlt͡sɛ] is a village in the administrative district of Gmina Lubin, within Lubin County, Lower Silesian Voivodeship, in south-western Poland.
