= Zimna Woda =

Zimna Woda (Polish/Russian/Ukrainian for "Cold Water") may refer to the following places in Poland or Ukraine:

- Zimna Woda, Lviv Oblast (west Ukraine)
- Zimna Woda, Lower Silesian Voivodeship (south-west Poland)
- Zimna Woda, Pajęczno County in Łódź Voivodeship (central Poland)
- Zimna Woda, Zgierz County in Łódź Voivodeship (central Poland)
- Zimna Woda, Lublin Voivodeship (east Poland)
- Zimna Woda, Subcarpathian Voivodeship (south-east Poland)
- Zimna Woda, Masovian Voivodeship (east-central Poland)
- Zimna Woda, Nidzica County in Warmian-Masurian Voivodeship (north Poland)
- Zimna Woda, Szczytno County in Warmian-Masurian Voivodeship (north Poland)
