= Raszowa, Lower Silesian Voivodeship =

Raszowa
- Village
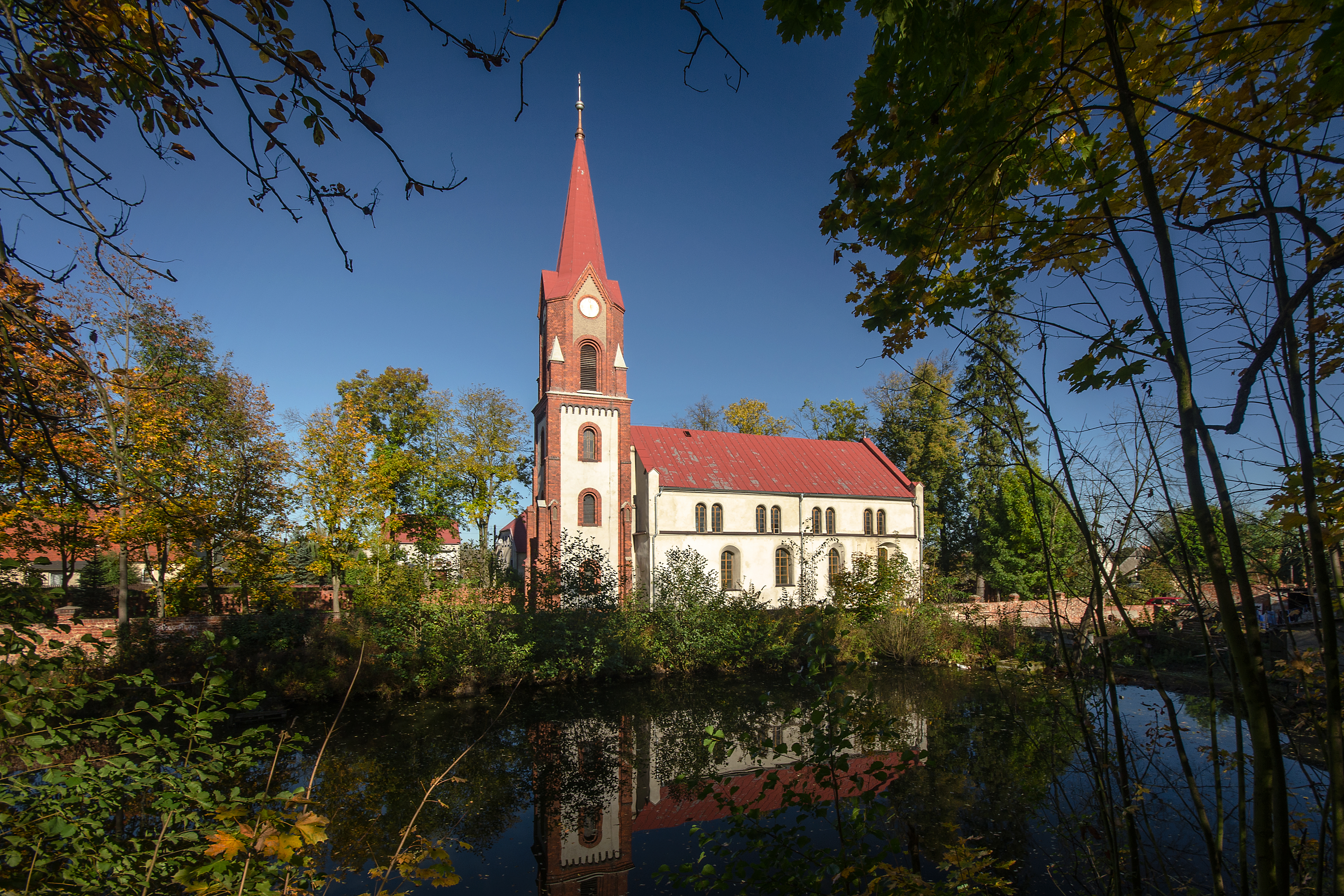
- Immaculate Conception church in Raszowa

- Location within Poland
- Coordinates: 51°19′12″N 16°13′54″E
- Country: Poland
- Voivodeship: Lower Silesian
- County: Lubin
- Gmina: Lubin
- First mentioned: 1267
- Time zone: UTC+1 (CET)
  - Summer (DST): UTC+2 (CEST)
- Vehicle registration: DLU

Raszowa [raˈʂɔva] is a village in the administrative district of Gmina Lubin, within Lubin County, Lower Silesian Voivodeship, in south-western Poland.

== History ==
The village was first mentioned in Old Polish as Rasowa in a 1267 deed, when it was part of fragmented Piast-ruled Poland. The village later passed to Bohemia, Prussia and Germany. During World War II, the German administration operated a forced labor subcamp of the Stalag VIII-A prisoner-of-war camp in the village.

From 1975 to 1998 it was located in the former Legnica Voivodeship.
