= Czerniec, Lower Silesian Voivodeship =

Czerniec
- Village
- Location within Poland
- Coordinates: 51°22′49″N 16°17′48″E
- Country: Poland
- Voivodeship: Lower Silesian
- County: Lubin
- Gmina: Lubin
- Population: 290

Czerniec [ˈt͡ʂɛrɲɛt͡s] is a village in the administrative district of Gmina Lubin, within Lubin County, Lower Silesian Voivodeship, in southwestern Poland.
