= Karczowiska =

- Village
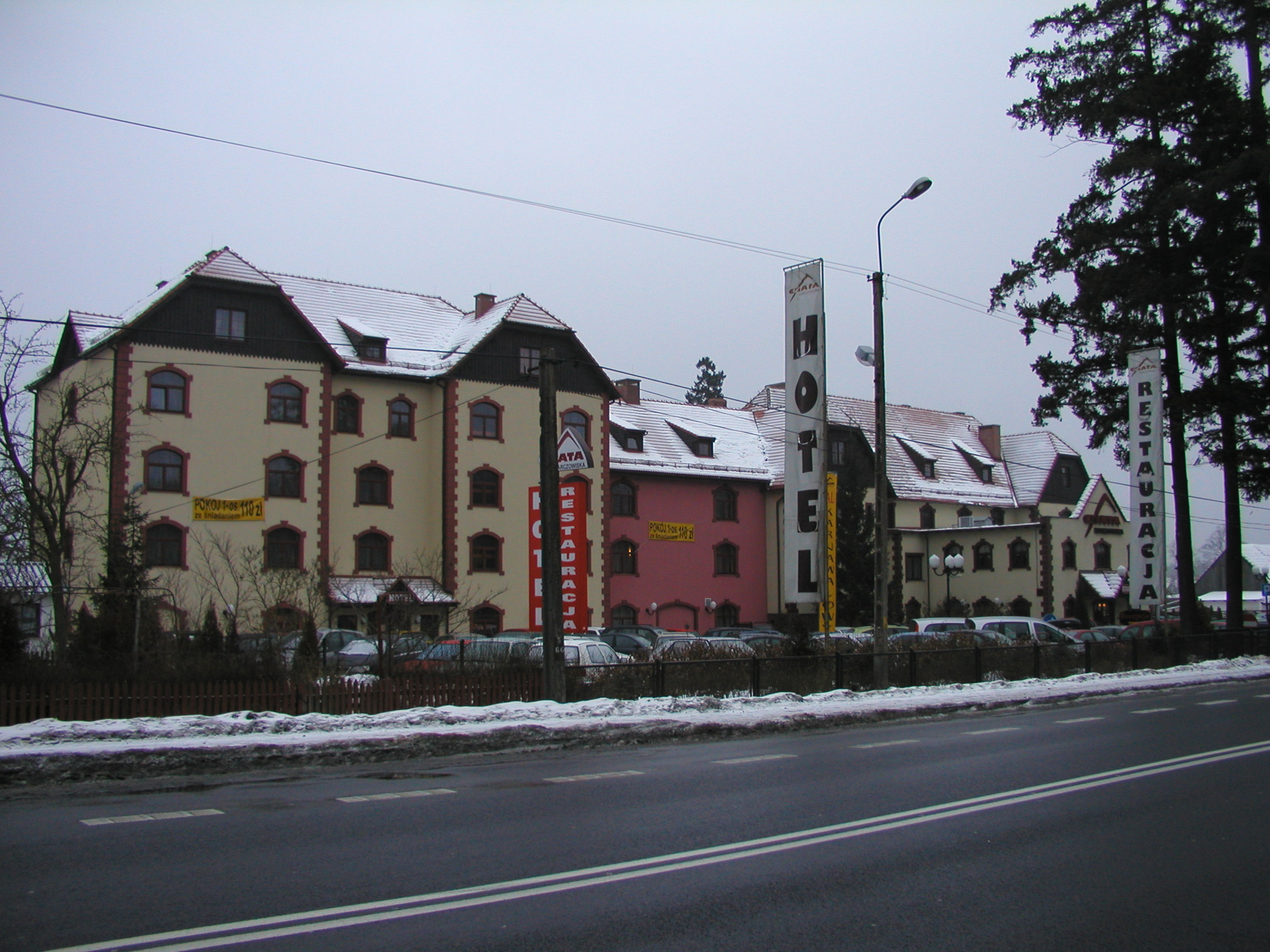

- Location within Poland
- Coordinates: 51°18′19″N 16°09′35″E
- Country: Poland
- Voivodeship: Lower Silesian
- County: Lubin
- Gmina: Lubin

Karczowiska [kart͡ʂɔˈviska] is a village in the administrative district of Gmina Lubin, within Lubin County, Lower Silesian Voivodeship, in south-western Poland.
