= Miłoradzice =

- Village
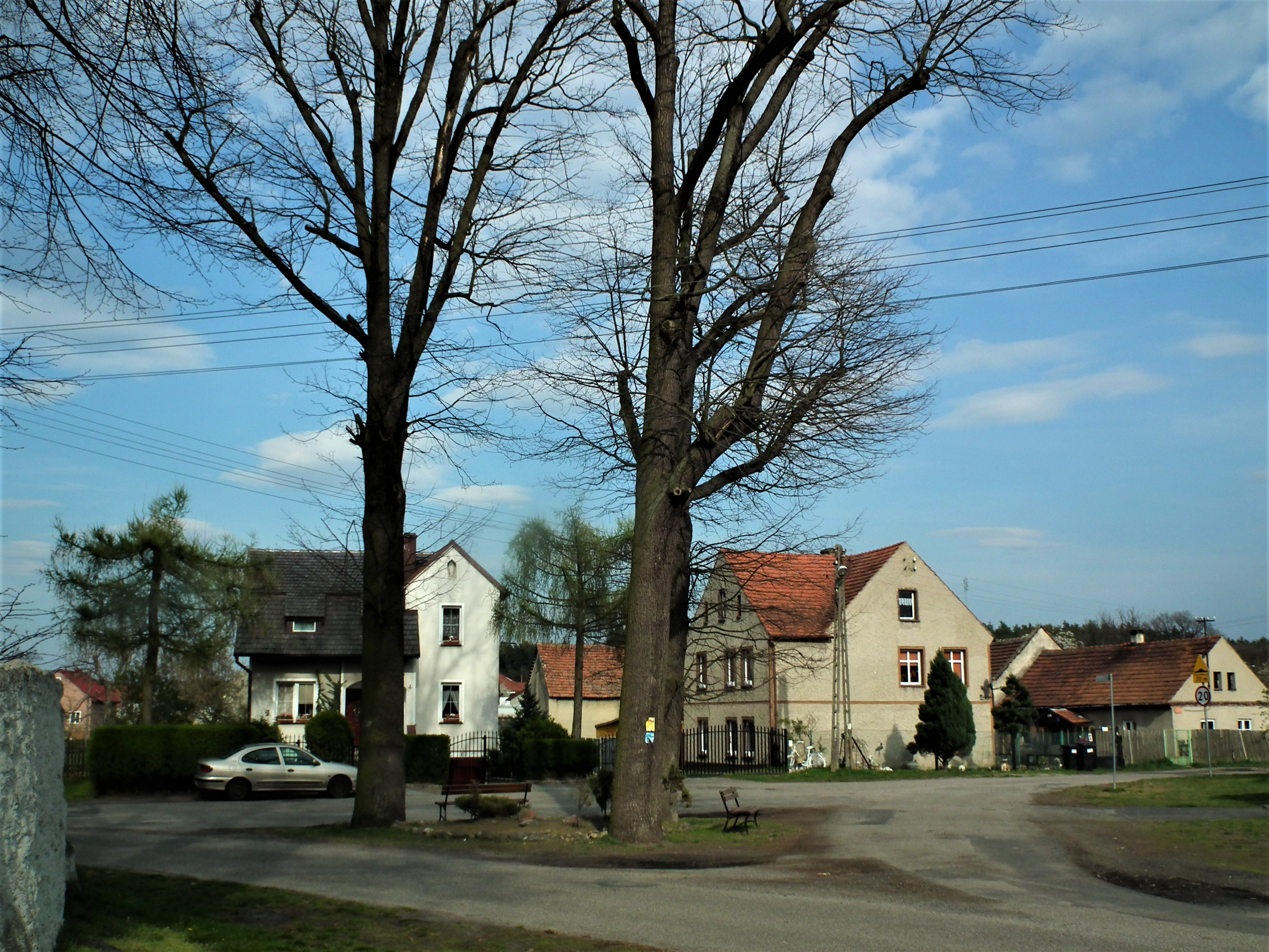

- Location within Poland
- Coordinates: 51°19′23″N 16°16′11″E
- Country: Poland
- Voivodeship: Lower Silesian
- County: Lubin
- Gmina: Lubin
- Population: 360

Miłoradzice [miwɔraˈd͡ʑit͡sɛ] is a village in the administrative district of Gmina Lubin, within Lubin County, Lower Silesian Voivodeship, in south-western Poland.
