= Krzeczyn Mały =

- Village
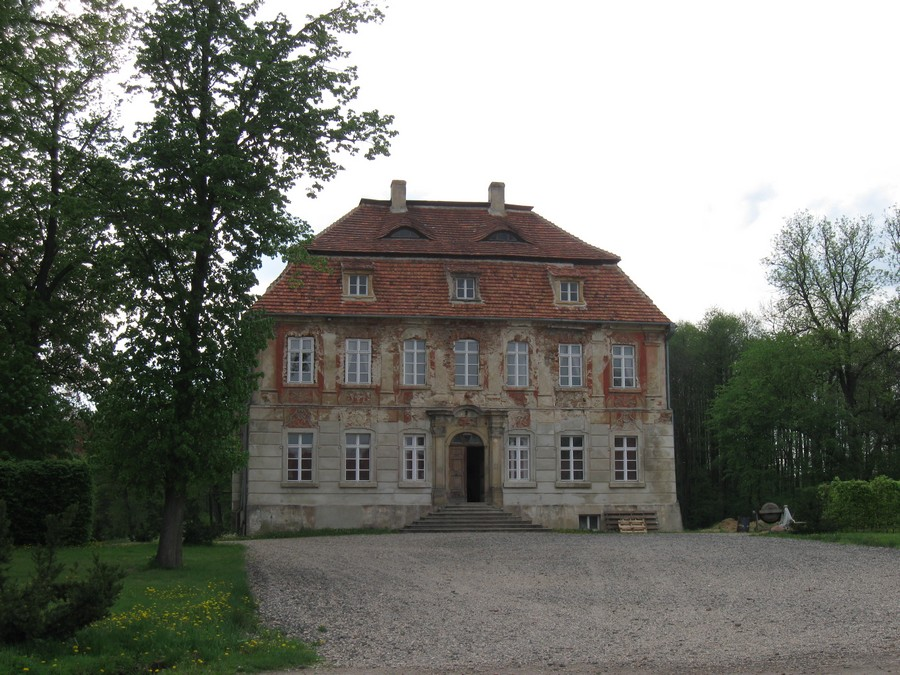
- Palace

- Location within Poland
- Coordinates: 51°23′05″N 16°06′53″E
- Country: Poland
- Voivodeship: Lower Silesian
- County: Lubin
- Gmina: Lubin
- Time zone: UTC+1 (CET)
  - Summer (DST): UTC+2 (CEST)
- Vehicle registration: DLU

Krzeczyn Mały [ˈkʂɛt͡ʂɨn ˈmawɨ] is a village in the administrative district of Gmina Lubin, within Lubin County, Lower Silesian Voivodeship, in south-western Poland.

The village at various times was part of Poland, Bohemia, Prussia and Germany, before returning to Polish rule after the defeat of Germany in World War II. The former German Junker (landed nobility) of the Harrach family left a Baroque palace which since 1997 is a property of Count Ghislain de Nicolay.
