= Wiercień, Lower Silesian Voivodeship =

Wiercień
- Village
- Location within Poland
- Coordinates: 51°18′N 16°7′E
- Country: Poland
- Voivodeship: Lower Silesian
- County: Lubin
- Gmina: Lubin

Wiercień [ˈvjɛrt͡ɕɛɲ] is a village in the administrative district of Gmina Lubin, within Lubin County, Lower Silesian Voivodeship, in south-western Poland.
