= Gorzyca, Lower Silesian Voivodeship =

Gorzyca
- Village
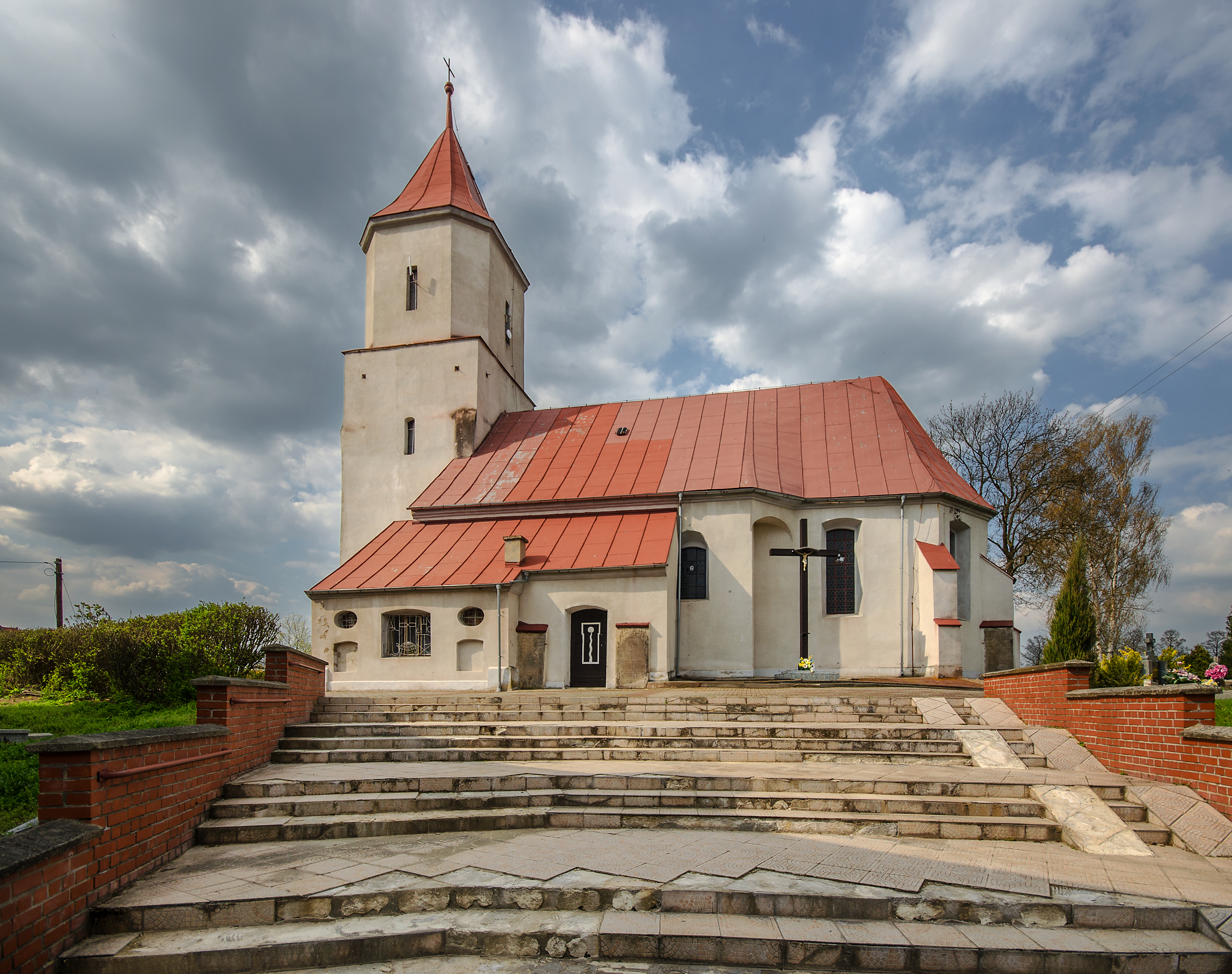
- Church of Saint Joseph

- Location within Poland
- Coordinates: 51°22′21″N 16°06′04″E
- Country: Poland
- Voivodeship: Lower Silesian
- County: Lubin
- Gmina: Lubin
- Time zone: UTC+1 (CET)
  - Summer (DST): UTC+2 (CEST)
- Vehicle registration: DLU

Gorzyca [ɡɔˈʐɨt͡sa], sometimes Górzyca, (formerly Skowronków German: Lerchenborn) is a village in the administrative district of Gmina Lubin, within Lubin County, Lower Silesian Voivodeship, in south-western Poland.

== Notable people ==
- Carl Abraham Gerhard, German minerologist and geologist, founder of Bergakademie Berlin that later became Technische Universität Berlin
