= Zimna Woda, Lower Silesian Voivodeship =

Zimna Woda
- Village
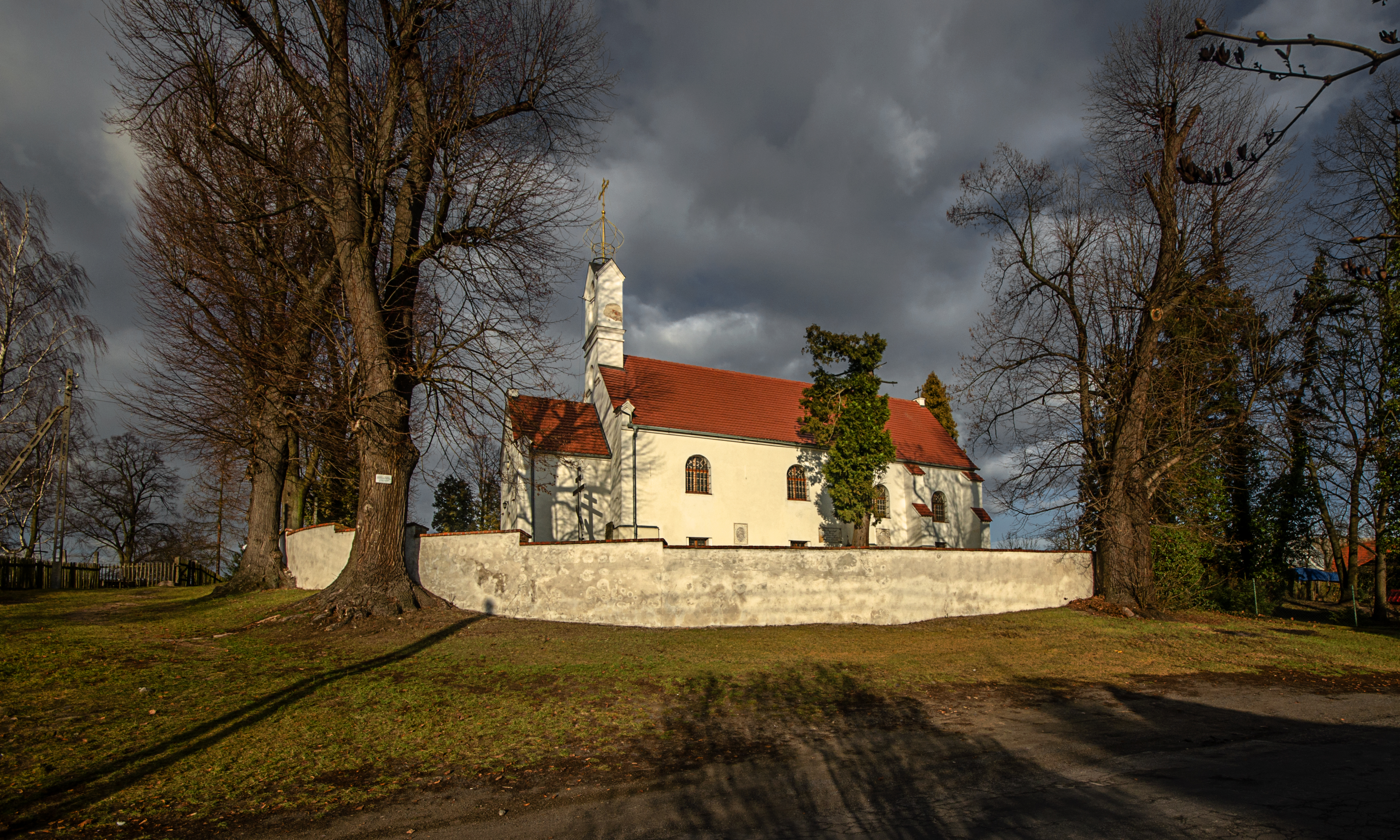

- Location within Poland
- Coordinates: 51°19′05″N 16°06′35″E
- Country: Poland
- Voivodeship: Lower Silesian
- County: Lubin
- Gmina: Lubin

Zimna Woda [ˈʑimna ˈvɔda] is a village in the administrative district of Gmina Lubin, within Lubin County, Lower Silesian Voivodeship, in south-western Poland.
