= John Jonston =

Polish scholar and physician

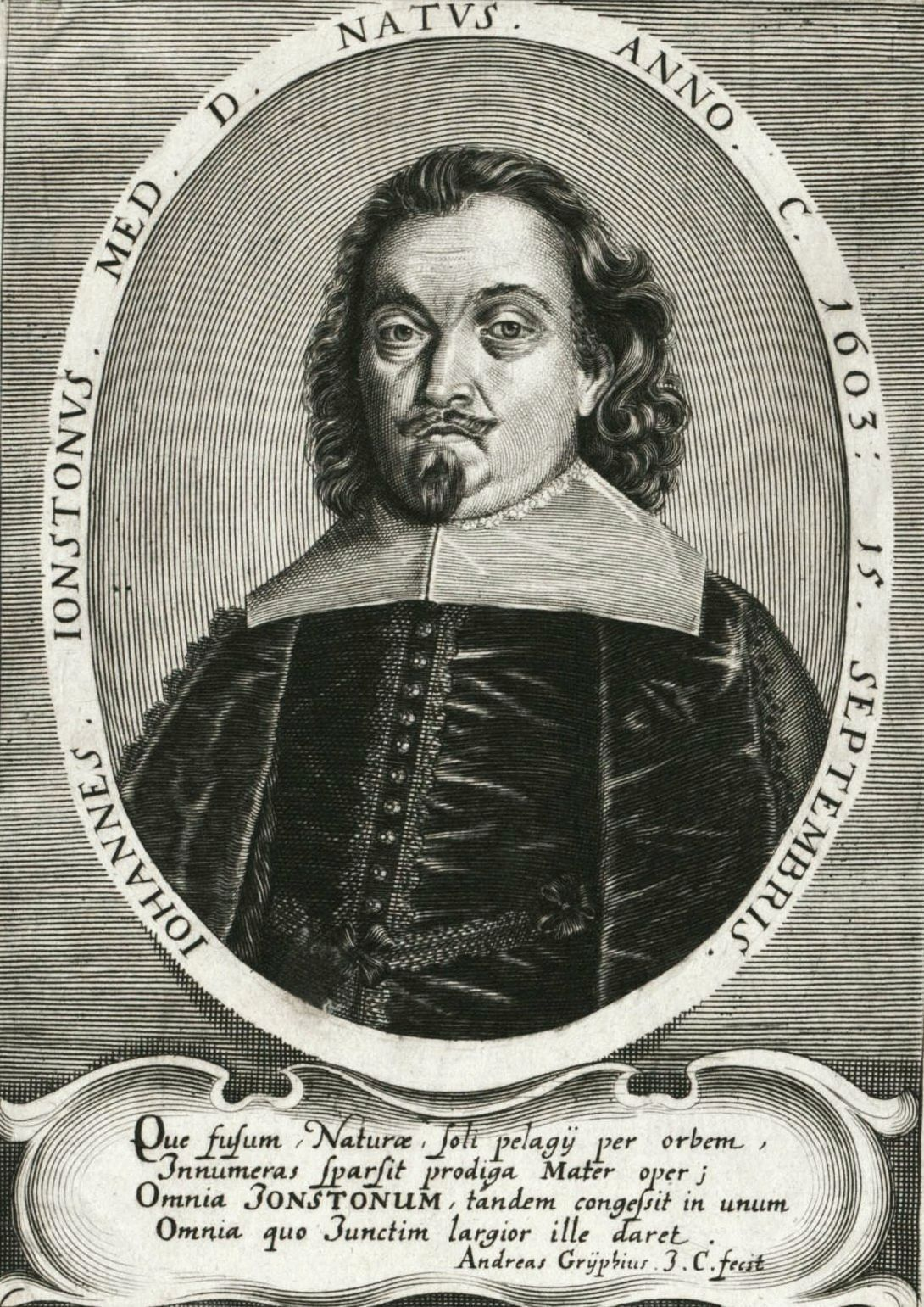
- Jonston, ca. 1650
- Born: September 15, 1603; Szamotuły
- Died: c. 1675; Składowice
- Resting place: Leszno
- Occupations: botanist, physician

John Jonston or Johnston (Polish: Jan Jonston; Latin: Joannes or Johannes Jonstonus or Johnstonus; 15 September 1603 – c. 1675) was a Polish scholar and physician, descended from Scottish nobility and closely associated with the Polish magnate Leszczyński family. The standard author abbreviation Jonst. is used to indicate this person as the author when citing a botanical name.

== Life ==
Jonston was born in Szamotuły, the son of Simon Johnston, who had emigrated to the Polish–Lithuanian Commonwealth from Scotland. Jonston's early education was sponsored by one of his two paternal uncles who had come to the Commonwealth with his father.

From 1611 Jonston attended the school of the Bohemian Brothers in Ostroróg, then the Schoenaichianum in Bytom Odrzański, and from 1619 the gymnasium in Toruń. As a Calvinist, he could not attend the Catholic Jagiellonian University. Consequently, he earned his first degree at the University of St Andrews (1622–25; M.A., 1623), where he studied theology, scholastic philosophy, and Hebrew. His sponsors included the Primate of All Scotland, John Spottiswood.

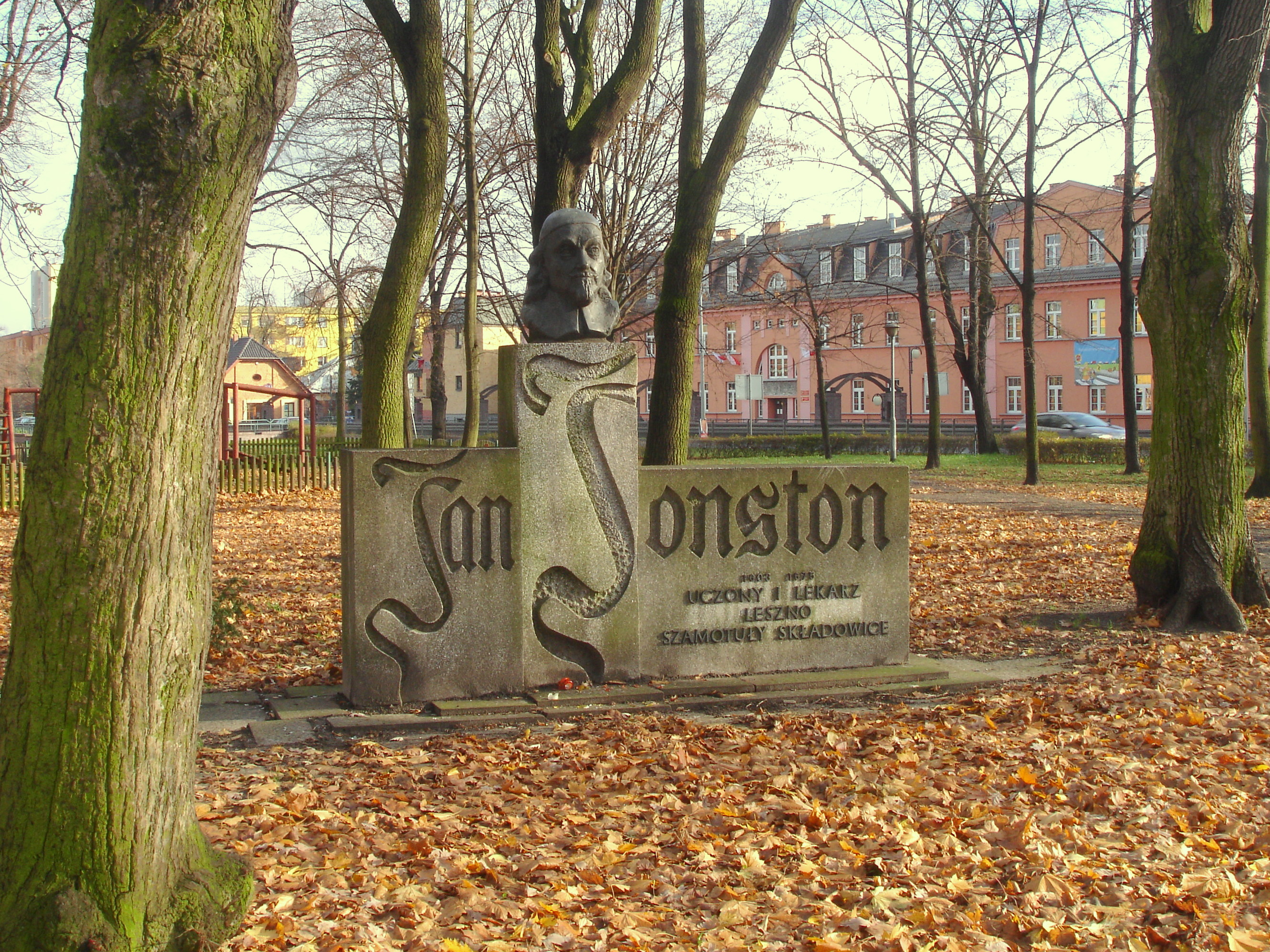
Monument to Jan Jonston, Leszno

In 1625 Jonston returned to the Polish–Lithuanian Commonwealth. Until 1628 he was a private tutor in the household of the Kurtzbach-Zawadski family in Leszno, where he was an active member of the Czech Brethren community. Around 1625-28 he published Enchiridion historiae naturalis, which in 1657 would be translated into English.

In 1628 Jonston traveled to the Holy Roman Empire (Wittenberg, Leipzig, Frankfurt, Franeker) to resume his studies. He attended the University of Cambridge, where he studied botany and medicine and the Universities of Frankfurt, Franeker and Leiden, matriculating in 1630. That year he was offered a chair of philosophy at Deventer but declined it, preferring to return to the Commonwealth to become once again a private tutor. This time he took up a post with Rafał Leszczyński, voivode of Bełz, where he tutored his son, Bogusław Leszczyński.

In 1632 Jonston travelled abroad with Bogusław and several other Commonwealth magnates' sons. Their first stop was in Franeker (1632), followed by Leiden and Amsterdam all, that same year, where Jonston published his Thaumatographia naturalis. In 1634 they visited England, returning to Leiden, where Jonston received an M.D. degree; soon afterward he would receive a second M.D. degree (ad eundem) from Cambridge. That year he also received a Doctorate from both those universities, for his dissertation De febribus (On Fevers). Bogusław, Jonston and the others toured Europe until 1636, returning to Poland upon news of Bogusław's father's death. Jonston returned to Leszno, remaining a Leszczyński retainer, in whose service he had the title of Archiater et Civitatis Lesnensis Physicus Ordinarius.

In Leszno he was employed at the Leszno gymnasium, where he was a friend of Comenius, who was another important member of the school's faculty. In 1642 Jonston once again turned down an offer to chair a department abroad (this time, that of medicine at Frankfurt). That same year, his Idea universae medicinae practicae was published in Amsterdam (it would be translated into English in 1652). Jonston would turn down further offers from Heidelberg and Leiden.

In 1652 he purchased (or inherited) an estate at Ziebendorf (now Składowice) near Legnica. In 1665, following the Polish-Swedish War (The Deluge), which worsened public attitudes toward the Commonwealth's Protestants, he retired from Leszno to his newly bought estate. He remained there for the rest of his life.

He died at Legnica around 1675.

== Works ==
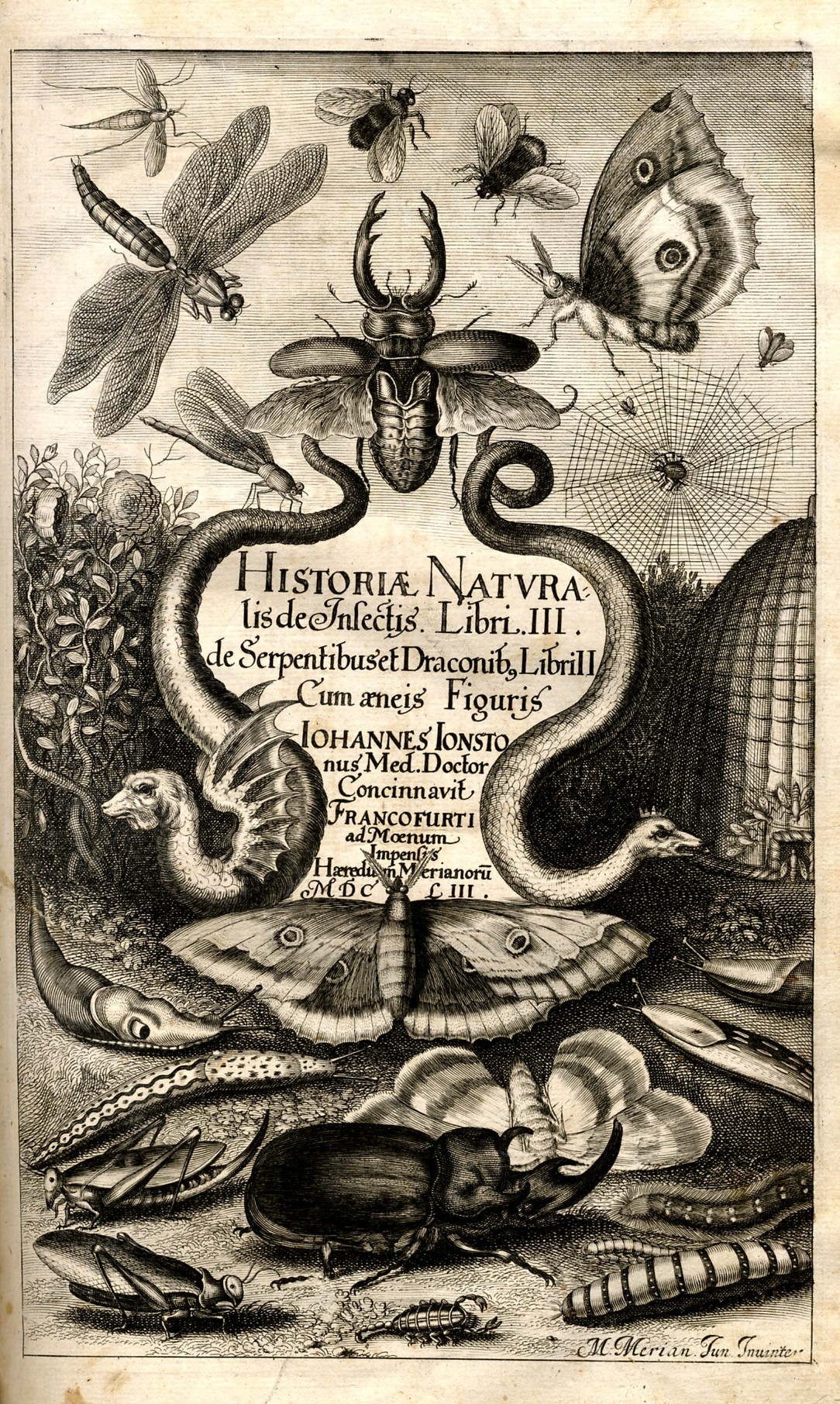
Title page of Historiae naturalis de insectis libri III, de serpentibus et draconibus libri II, cum aeneis figuris, 1653

- Historia civilis et ecclesiastica. Ab orbe condito ad annum 1633. Editio postrema emendata (Elsevir, Amsterdam, 1644).
- Historiae naturalis de quadrupedibus libri, cum aeneis figuris, Johannes Jonstonus,... concinnavit (J. J. Schipperi, Amsterdam, 1657).
- Historiae naturalis de insectis libri II, de serpentibus et draconibus libri II, cum aeneis figuris, Joh. Jonstonus,... concinnavit (Ad Moenum 1653; reissued J. J. fil. Schipper, Amsterdam, 1657, reissued 1665).
- Historiae naturalis de insectis libri III, de serpentibus et draconibus libri II, cum aeneis figuris, Joh. Jonstonus,... concinnavit (deux parties en un volume, J. J. fil. Schipper, Amsterdam, 1657, reissued 1667).
- Historiae naturalis de exanguibus aquaticis libri IV, cum figuris aeneis, Joannes Jonstonus,... concinnavit (J. J. Schipperi, Amsterdam, 1657, reissued 1665).
- Historiae naturalis de piscibus et cetis libri V, cum aeneis figuris, Johannes Jonstonus,... concinnavit (J. J. Schipperi, Amsterdam, 1657).
- Historiae naturalis de avibus libri VI cum aeneis figuris Johannes Jonstonus,... concinnavit (J. J. Schipperi, Amsterdam, 1657).
- De Communione veteris Ecclesiae syntagma, ex bibliotheca Johannis Jonstoni,... (Elsevir, Amsterdam, 1658).
- Johannis Jonstonii,... de Festis Hebraeorum et Graecorum schediasma (V.J. Trescheri, Bratislava, 1660).
- Naeukeurige Beschryving Van de Natuur der Vier-voetige dieren, ... en Draken. Dutch translation by M. Grausius of the Historiae naturalis ... libri I-VI (I. I. Schipper, Amsterdam, 1660). Some copies with contemporary hand-coloured engravings exist.
- Magni Hippocratis,... Coacae praenotiones, graece et latine... cum versione D. Anutii Foesii,... et notis Joh. Jonstoni,... (Elsevir, Amsterdam, 1660).
- Idea hygieines recensita, libri II. Johannes Jonstonus,... cum cura revidit (V.J. Trescheri, Jena, 1661, reissued 1667).
- Notitia regni mineralis, seu Subterraneorum catalogus, cum praecipuis differentiis (V.J. Trescheri, Leipzig, 1661).
- Notitia regni vegetabilis, seu Plantarum a veteribus observatarum... in suas classes redacta series (V.J. Trescheri, Leipzig, 1661).
- Dendrographias, sive historiae naturalis de arboribus et fructicibus, tam nostri quam peregrini orbis, libri decem, figuris aeneis adornati, Johannes Jonstonus,... concinnavit... (M. Meriani, Frankfurt, 1662).
- Historiae naturalis de serpentibus, libri II, Joannes Jonstonus,... concinnavit (J. J. Schipperi, Amsterdam, 1667).
- A Description of the Nature of Four-footed Beasts (London, 1678). An English translation of Historiae naturalis de quadripedibus, with 80 engraved illustrations.
- Theatrum universale omnium animalium insectorum (in Latin). Heilbronn: Franz Josef Eckebrecht. 1767.

== See also ==
- Matthäus Merian Illustrator of many of Jonston's books.
- List of Poles
- History of philosophy in Poland
