= Pieszków, Lubin County =

Pieszków
- Village
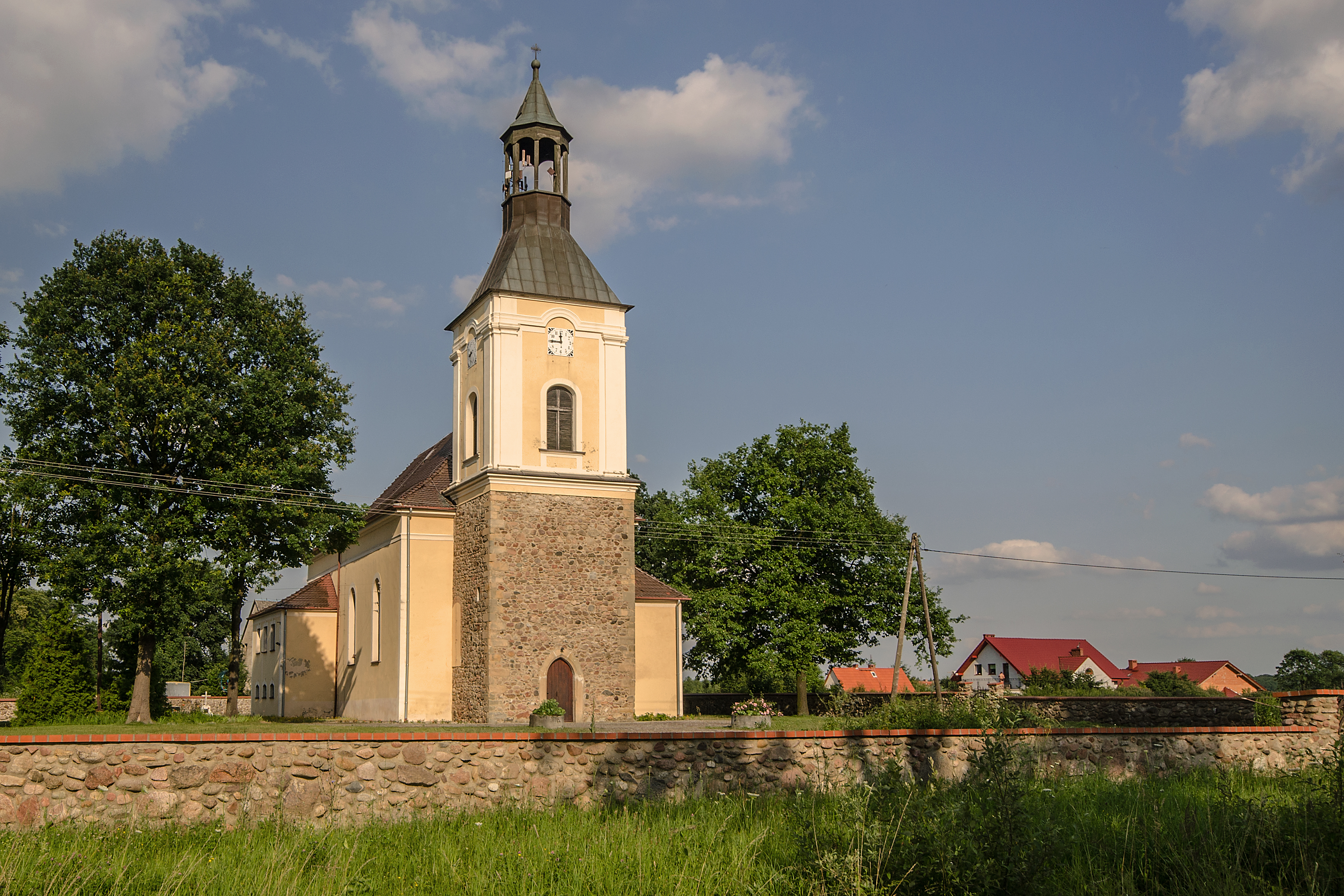
- Our Lady of Częstochowa church in Pieszków

- Location within Poland
- Coordinates: 51°20′N 16°14′E
- Country: Poland
- Voivodeship: Lower Silesian
- County: Lubin
- Gmina: Lubin
- Time zone: UTC+1 (CET)
  - Summer (DST): UTC+2 (CEST)
- Vehicle registration: DLU

Pieszków [ˈpjɛʂkuf] is a village in the administrative district of Gmina Lubin, within Lubin County, Lower Silesian Voivodeship, in south-western Poland.

The name of the village is of Polish origin and comes from the word pies, which means "dog".

== Transport ==
The S3 highway runs nearby, west of the village.
