= Gogołowice, Lubin County =

Gogołowice
- Village
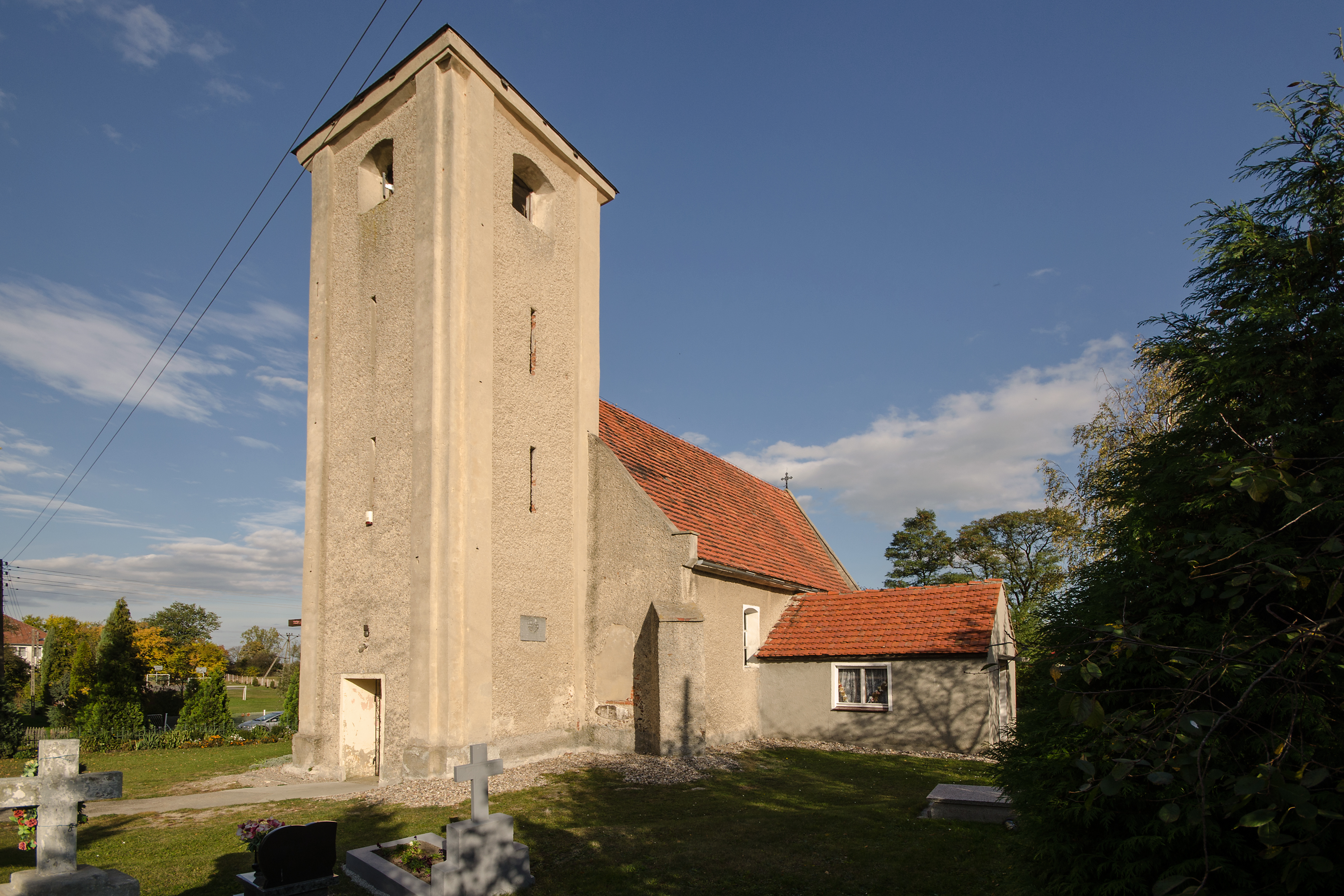
- Catholic church

- Location within Poland
- Coordinates: 51°19′02″N 16°19′23″E
- Country: Poland
- Voivodeship: Lower Silesian
- County: Lubin
- Gmina: Lubin

Gogołowice [ɡɔɡɔwɔˈvit͡sɛ] is a village in the administrative district of Gmina Lubin, within Lubin County, Lower Silesian Voivodeship, in south-western Poland. It was first mentioned in a 1267 deed as Old Polish Gogolevicci.
