= Miłosna, Lower Silesian Voivodeship =

Miłosna
- Village
- Location within Poland
- Coordinates: 51°19′54″N 16°18′15″E
- Country: Poland
- Voivodeship: Lower Silesian
- County: Lubin
- Gmina: Lubin

Miłosna [miˈwɔsna] is a village in the administrative district of Gmina Lubin, within Lubin County, Lower Silesian Voivodeship, in south-western Poland.
