= Niemstów, Lower Silesian Voivodeship =

Niemstów
- Village
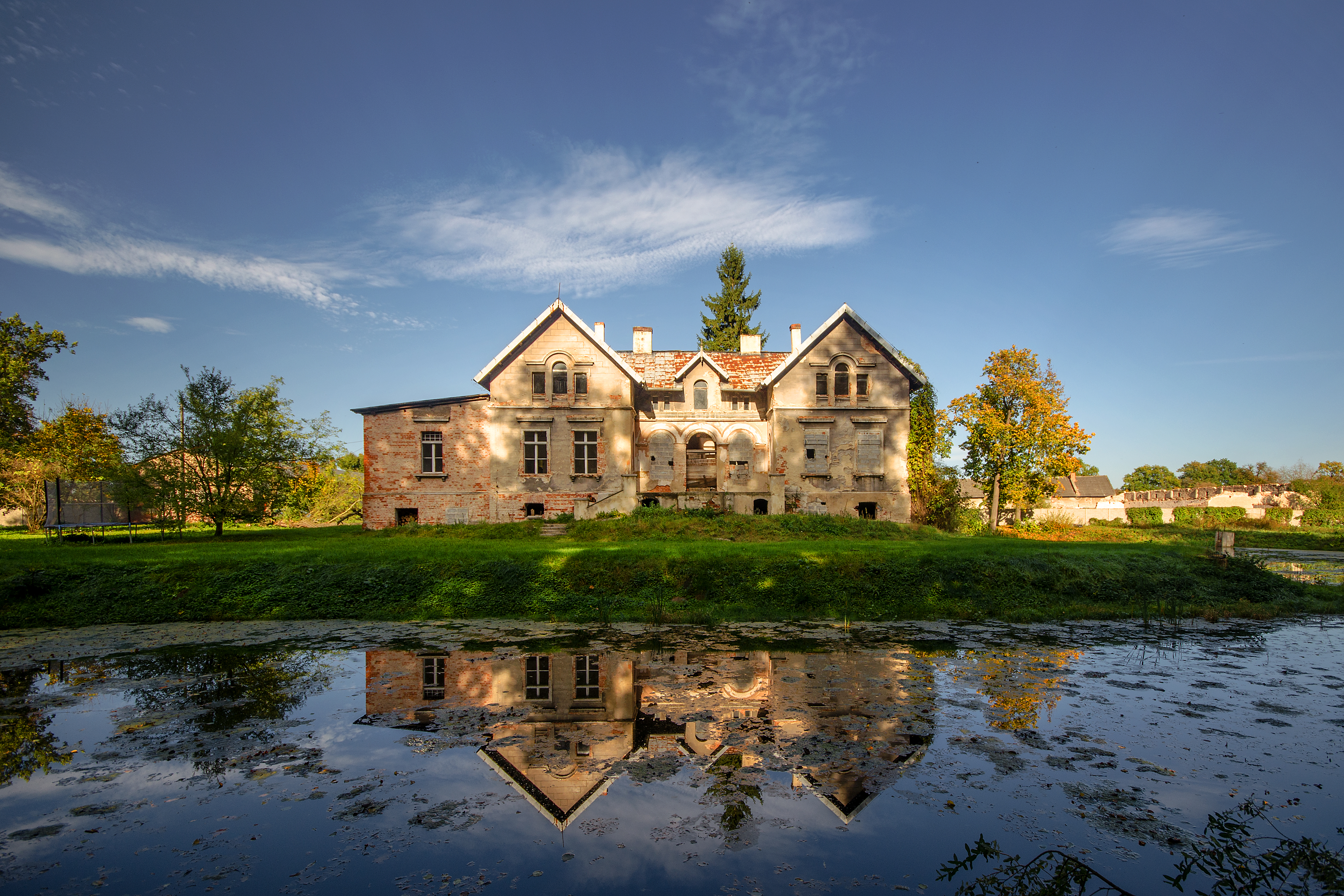

- Location within Poland
- Coordinates: 51°21′26″N 16°17′38″E
- Country: Poland
- Voivodeship: Lower Silesian
- County: Lubin
- Gmina: Lubin

Niemstów [ˈɲɛmstuf] is a village in the administrative district of Gmina Lubin, within Lubin County, Lower Silesian Voivodeship, in south-western Poland.
