= Wyższa Szkoła Filologiczna =

Coordinates: 51°06′49″N 17°02′00″E

- Philological School of Higher Education
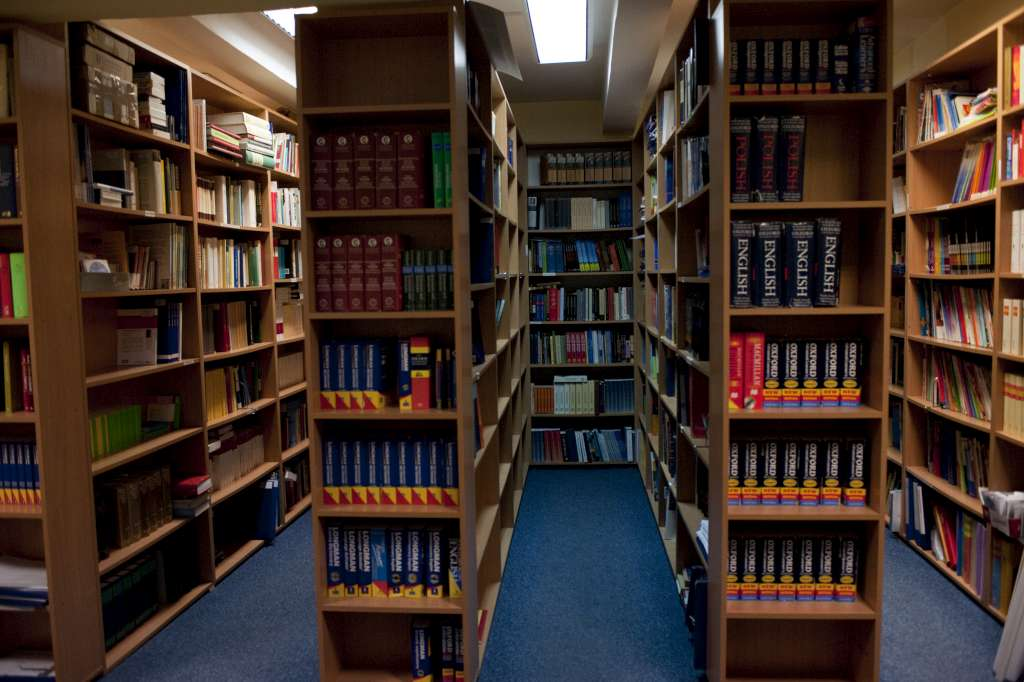
- Motto: Verba docent, exempla trahunt
- Type: Private university
- Established: 2002
- Chancellor: Ryszard Opala, MSc
- Rector: Professor Zdzisław Wąsik, PhD, D.Litt.
- Students: 2,000
- Location: Wrocław, Poland
- Website: www.wsf.edu.pl

Wyższa Szkoła Filologiczna (Philological School of Higher Education) is an accredited private language studies-oriented university located in Wrocław, Poland. Founded in 2002, it has approximately 2,000 students and offers BA and MA programs in English and American studies, German studies, Italian studies and Hispanic studies.

== History ==
Wyższa Szkoła Filologiczna we Wrocławiu (English: 'Philological School of Higher Education in Wrocław', German: Philologische Hochschule in Breslau, Spanish: Escuela Superior de Filologia de Wrocław) was founded in 2002 as a non-state college. It was entered into the Polish register of non-state higher education institutions on 14 March 2002 by the decision of the Polish Minister of Education and Sport.

Since its foundation, the university has concentrated exclusively on language studies, gradually extending its academic offer and preparing its students for work in the foreign language education industry, translations, tourism, business, media, editing, social/cultural management.

== Premises ==
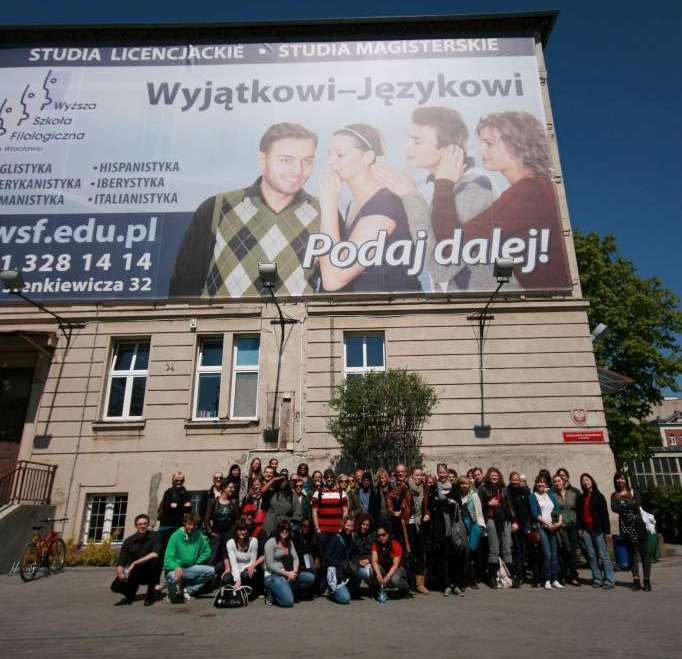
The university building and a group of students

Wyższa Szkoła Filologiczna is located in a four-storey building in the city center of Wrocław. The university facilities include 5 lecture halls equipped with PA systems and beamers, and 25 classrooms. WSF has its own library and reading room, as well as two computer rooms with broadband Internet connection. The whole building is covered with free wireless Internet access.

A snack bar, coat check, and two photocopy points are also available to the students.

The university administrative offices include the Secretary's Office, two Offices of Student Affairs and the Financial Administration Office.

== Organization ==
The university's formal head is the Rector (currently Professor Zdzisław Wąsik, PhD, D.Litt.), and the person involved with the day-to-day running of the university is the Chancellor (currently Ryszard Opala, MSc).

The university comprises the following departments:

- Department of Modern Languages and Literature
- Department of Linguistic Semiotics and Communicology
- Department of Lexicography and Translatology Studies
- Department of Axiological Linguistics
- Department of German Literary Studies
- Department of Ibero-Romanic Cultures and Literatures

== Library ==
The university library houses over 10,000 volumes of books and scholarly journals, and a media collection of over 1,500 volumes. The collection covers a wide range of language studies-related subjects, including linguistics, cultural studies, psycholinguistics, methodology, literary theory.

== IT Solutions ==
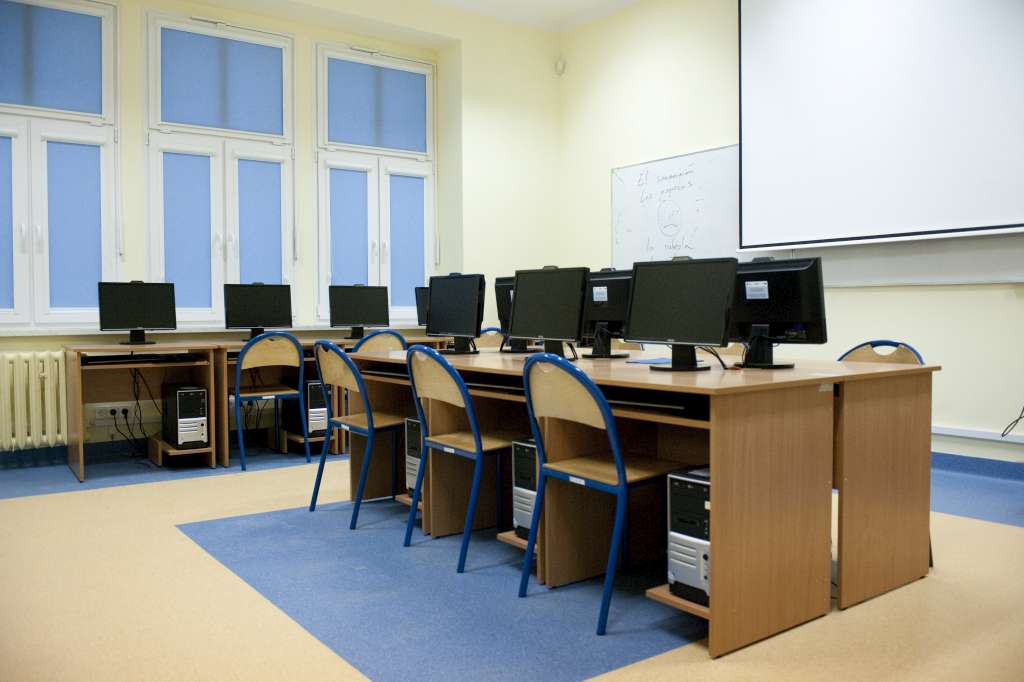
A WSF computer room

Wyższa Szkoła Filologiczna has implemented the following IT solutions to facilitate the day-to-day running of the university and the teaching process:

- online Student Affairs Office: a Microsoft SharePoint-based information and administration platform accessible to students after logging in, used for course enrollment, browsing university announcements, tracking your Academic Record, checking test and exam results, requesting certificates, filling out forms, and other administrative communication with the university.
- e-learning: WSF uses its own Moodle-based e-learning platform with video lectures, exercises, online tests and exams, and downloadable course materials.
