= Gmina Lubin =

Gmina Lubin Lubin Commune
- Gmina
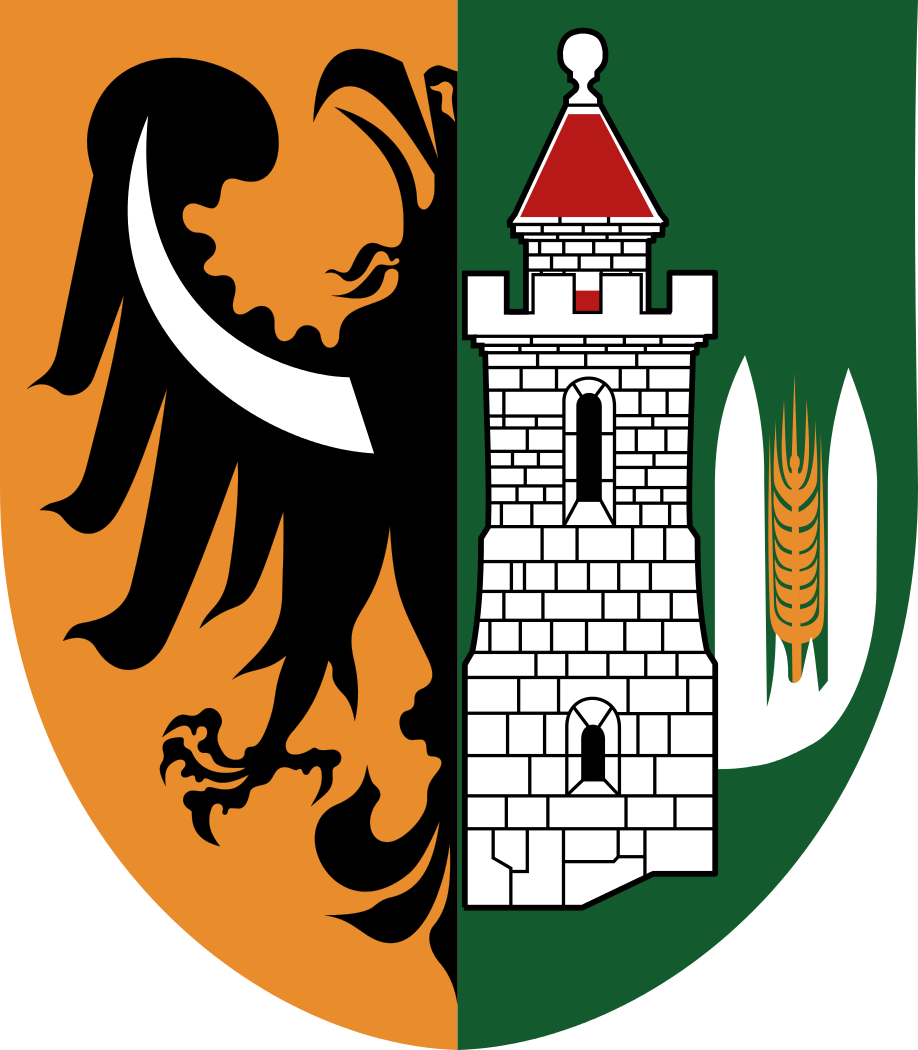
- Coat of arms
- Interactive map of Gmina Lubin
- Coordinates (Lubin): 51°24′N 16°12′E
- Country: Poland
- Voivodeship: Lower Silesian
- County: Lubin
- Seat: Lubin
- Sołectwos: Buczynka, Bukowna, Chróstnik, Czerniec, Dąbrowa Górna, Gogołowice, Gola, Gorzelin, Gorzyca, Karczowiska, Kłopotów, Krzeczyn Mały, Krzeczyn Wielki, Księginice, Lisiec, Miłoradzice, Miłosna, Miroszowice, Niemstów, Obora, Osiek, Pieszków, Raszowa, Raszowa Mała, Raszówka, Siedlce, Składowice, Szklary Górne, Ustronie, Wiercień, Zimna Woda

Government
  - Vogt: Tadeusz Kielan
  - Deputy Vogt: Bartosz Chojnacki

Area
  - Total: 290.15 km^{2} (112.03 sq mi)

Population (2019-06-30)
  - Total: 16,052
  - Density: 55.323/km^{2} (143.29/sq mi)
- Website: http://www.ug.lubin.pl

Gmina Lubin is a rural gmina (administrative district) in Lubin County, Lower Silesian Voivodeship, in south-western Poland. Its seat is the town of Lubin, although the town is not part of the territory of the gmina.

The gmina covers an area of 290.15 square kilometres (112.0 sq mi), and as of 2019 its total population is 16,052.

== Neighbouring gminas ==
Gmina Lubin is bordered by the town of Lubin and the gminas of Chocianów, Chojnów, Kunice, Miłkowice, Polkowice, Prochowice, Rudna and Ścinawa.

== Villages ==
The gmina contains the villages of Bolanów, Buczynka, Bukowna, Chróstnik, Czerniec, Dąbrowa Górna, Gogołowice, Gola, Gorzelin, Gorzyca, Karczowiska, Kłopotów, Krzeczyn Mały, Krzeczyn Wielki, Księginice, Łazek, Lisiec, Lubków, Miłoradzice, Miłosna, Miroszowice, Niemstów, Obora, Osiek, Owczary, Pieszków, Podgórze, Raszowa, Raszowa Mała, Raszówka, Siedlce, Składowice, Szklary Górne, Ustronie, Wiercień, Zalesie and Zimna Woda.

== Twin towns – sister cities ==
Gmina Lubin is twinned with:

- Sathonay-Camp, France
