= Lubin County =

Coordinates: 51°24′N 16°12′E

Lubin County Powiat lubiński
- County
- Flag Coat of arms

- Location within the voivodeship
- Country: Poland
- Voivodeship: Lower Silesian
- Seat: Lubin
- Gminas: Total 4 (incl. 1 urban): Lubin; Gmina Lubin; Gmina Rudna; Gmina Ścinawa

Area
  - Total: 711.99 km^{2} (274.90 sq mi)

Population (2019-06-30)
  - Total: 106,211
  - Density: 149.17/km^{2} (386.36/sq mi)
  - Urban: 78,010
  - Rural: 28,201
- Car plates: DLU
- Website: www.powiat-lubin.pl

Lubin County (Polish: powiat lubiński) (German:Lüben Kreis) is a unit of territorial administration and local government (powiat) in Lower Silesian Voivodeship, south-western Poland. It came into being on January 1, 1999, as a result of the Polish local government reforms passed in 1998. The county covers an area of 712 square kilometres (274.9 sq mi). Its administrative seat and largest town is Lubin, and its only other town is Ścinawa.

As of 2019 the total population of the county is 106,211, out of which the population of Lubin is 72,428, the population of Ścinawa is 5,582, and the rural population is 28,201.

== Neighbouring counties ==
Lubin County is bordered by Głogów County to the north, Góra County to the north-east, Wołów County to the east, Legnica County to the south and Polkowice County to the north-west.

== Administrative divisions ==
The county is subdivided into four gminas (one urban, one urban-rural and two rural). These are listed in the table below, in descending order of population.

Gmina	Type	Area (km^{2})	Population (2019)	Seat
Lubin	urban	40.8	72,428	
Gmina Lubin	rural	290.2	16,052	Lubin*
Gmina Ścinawa	urban-rural	164.6	9,938	Ścinawa
Gmina Rudna	rural	216.6	7,793	Rudna
* seat not part of the gmina
