= Jedlnia-Letnisko =

- Town
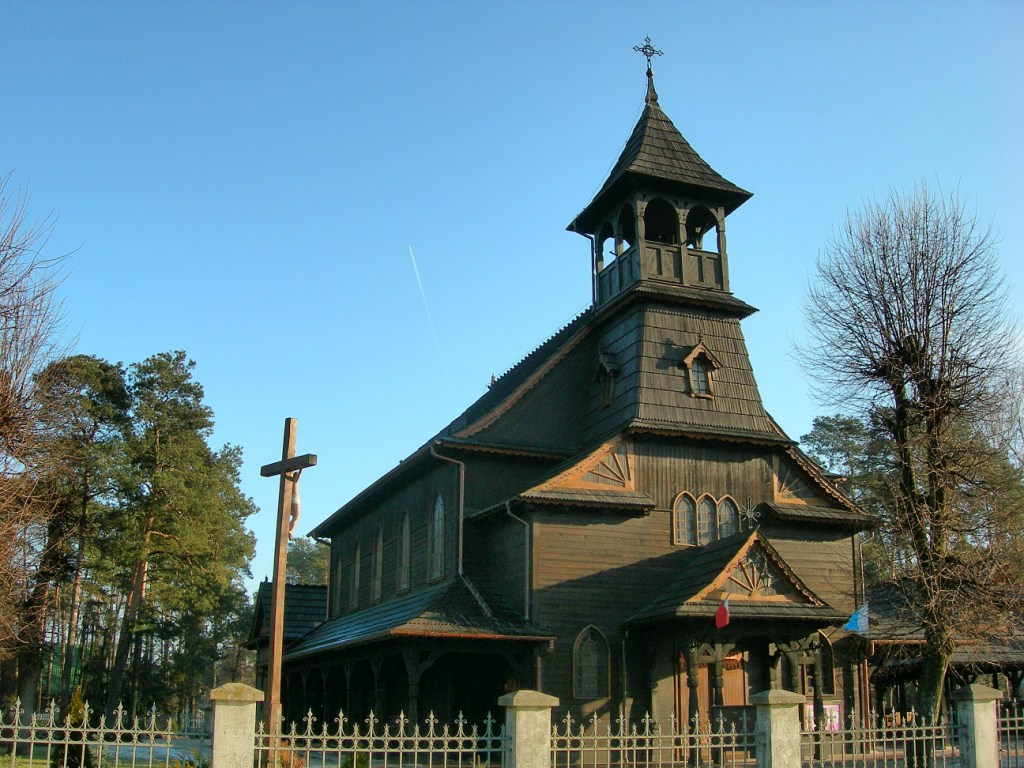
- Famous historic wooden Church of St. Joseph

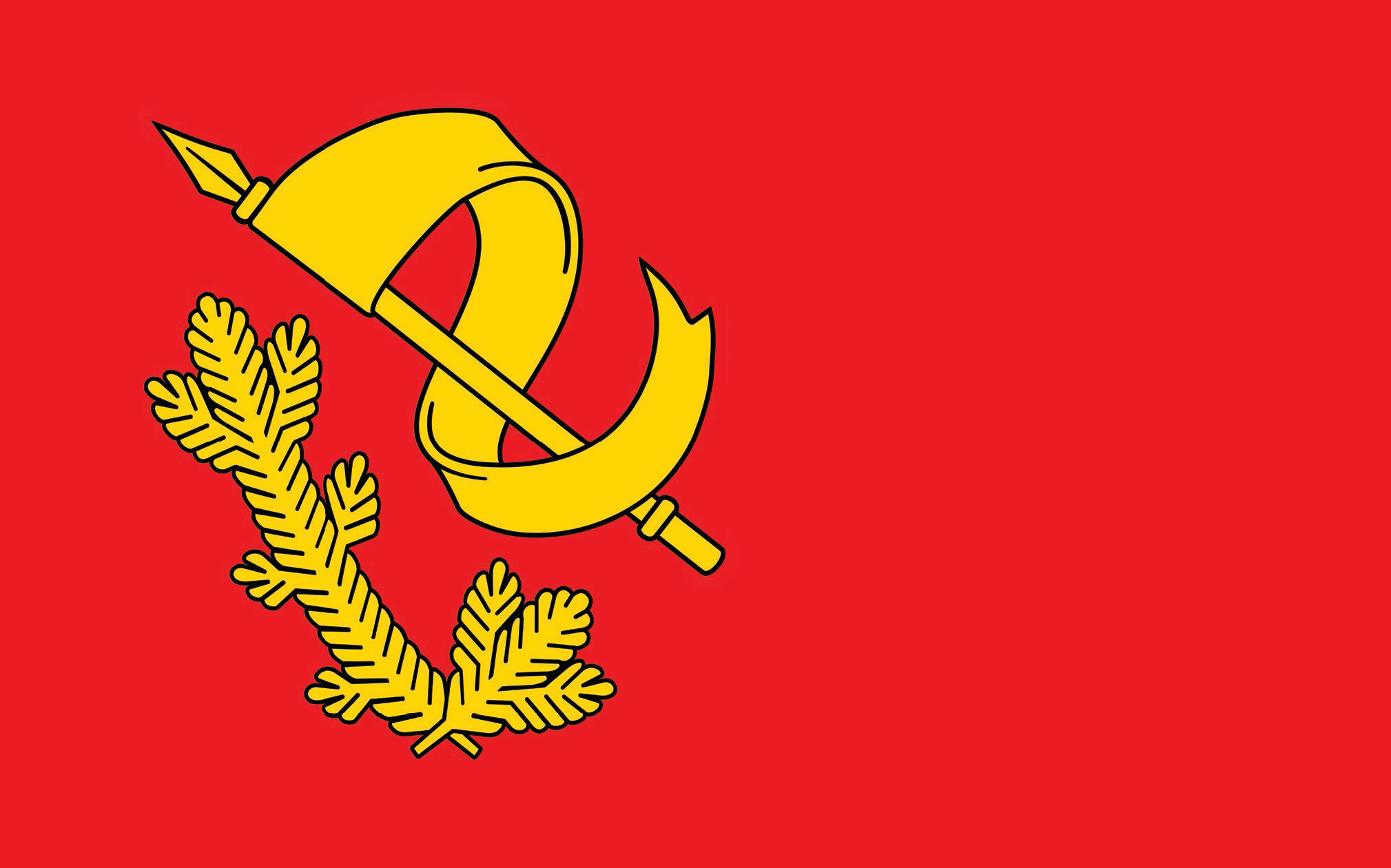
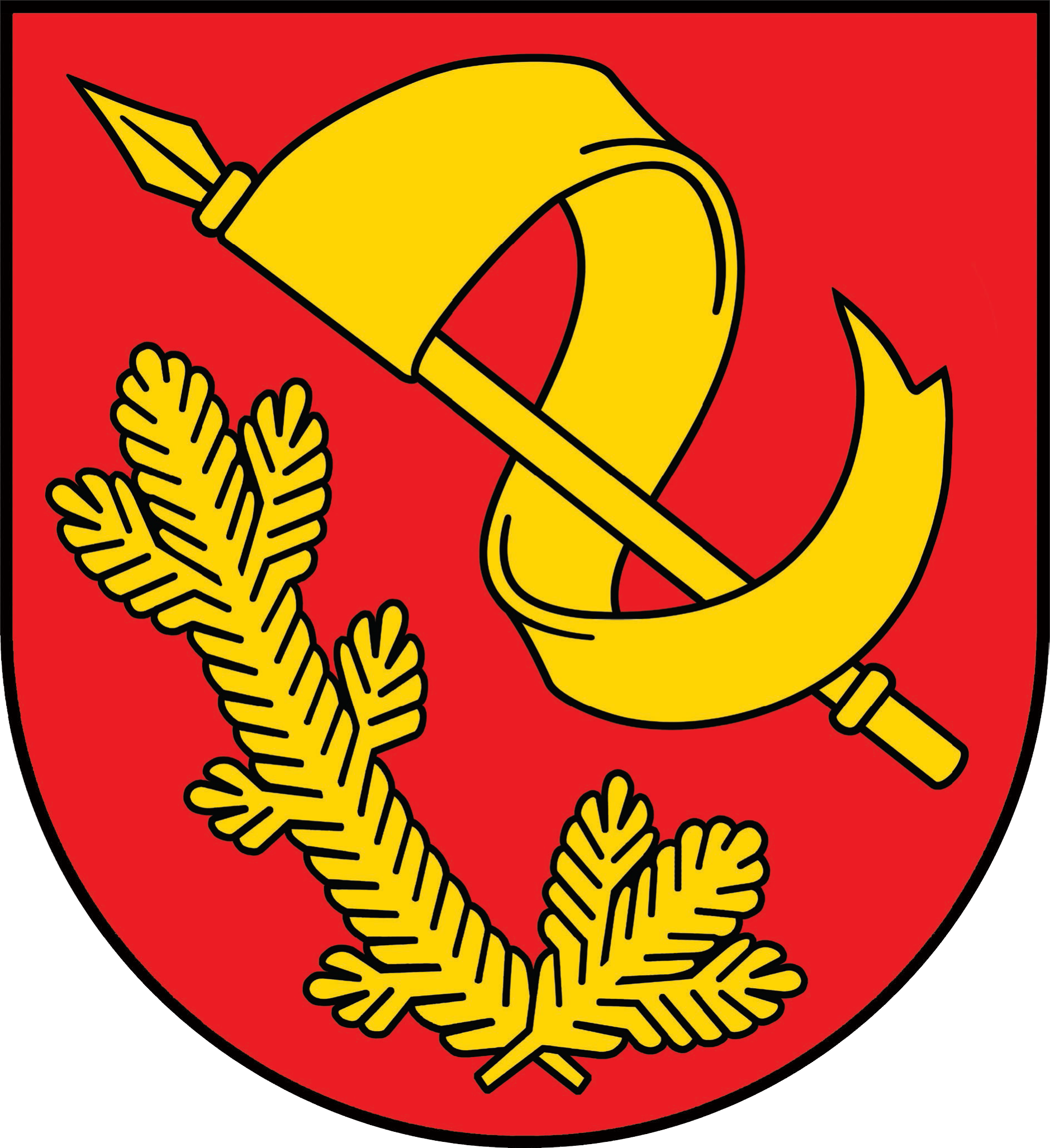
- Flag Coat of arms

- Location within Poland
- Coordinates: 51°25′47″N 21°20′4″E
- Country: Poland
- Voivodeship: Masovian
- County: Radom
- Gmina: Jedlnia-Letnisko
- Population: 3,692
- Time zone: UTC+1 (CET)
  - Summer (DST): UTC+2 (CEST)
- Vehicle registration: WRA
- Primary airport: Radom Airport
- Website: Jedlnia-Letnisko webpage Jedlnia webpage

Jedlnia-Letnisko [ˈjɛdlɲa lɛtˈniskɔ] is a town in Radom County, Masovian Voivodeship, in east-central Poland. It is the seat of the administrative gmina district called Gmina Jedlnia-Letnisko. The village has a population of 3,692.

== Recreational centre ==
Jedlnia-Letnisko is a popular tourist centre in Radom County. There are two walking trails and three bicycle trails leading through the Jedlnia Nature Reserve (86,42 ha), along the edge of the densely forested Kozienice Landscape Park.

One of the most notable natural monuments of the Jedlnia Nature Reserve is the Kościuszo Beech, an over 180-year-old European beech tree, named after Polish national hero Tadeusz Kościuszko.

== History ==
During the German occupation of Poland (World War II), the occupiers operated a forced labour camp in Jedlnia-Letnisko.

== Transport ==
The town is located at the intersection of Voivodeship roads (roads of regional importance) 699 and 737, and there is also a train station there. Route 26 of the Radom city bus network operates selected trips from Radom via Rajec Poduchowny, Antoniówka, Wrzosów and Siczki to a terminus located at the railway station since 3 January 2022.

== Gallery ==
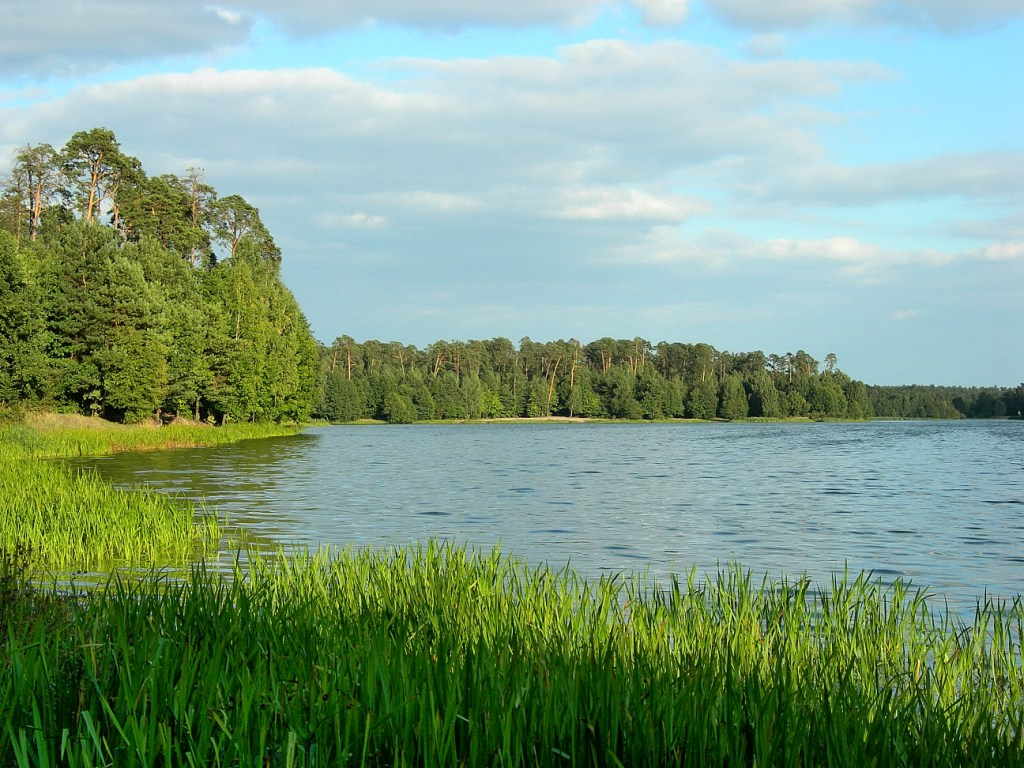
Recreational reservoir in Jedlnia-Letnisko at the edge of Kozienice Landscape Park

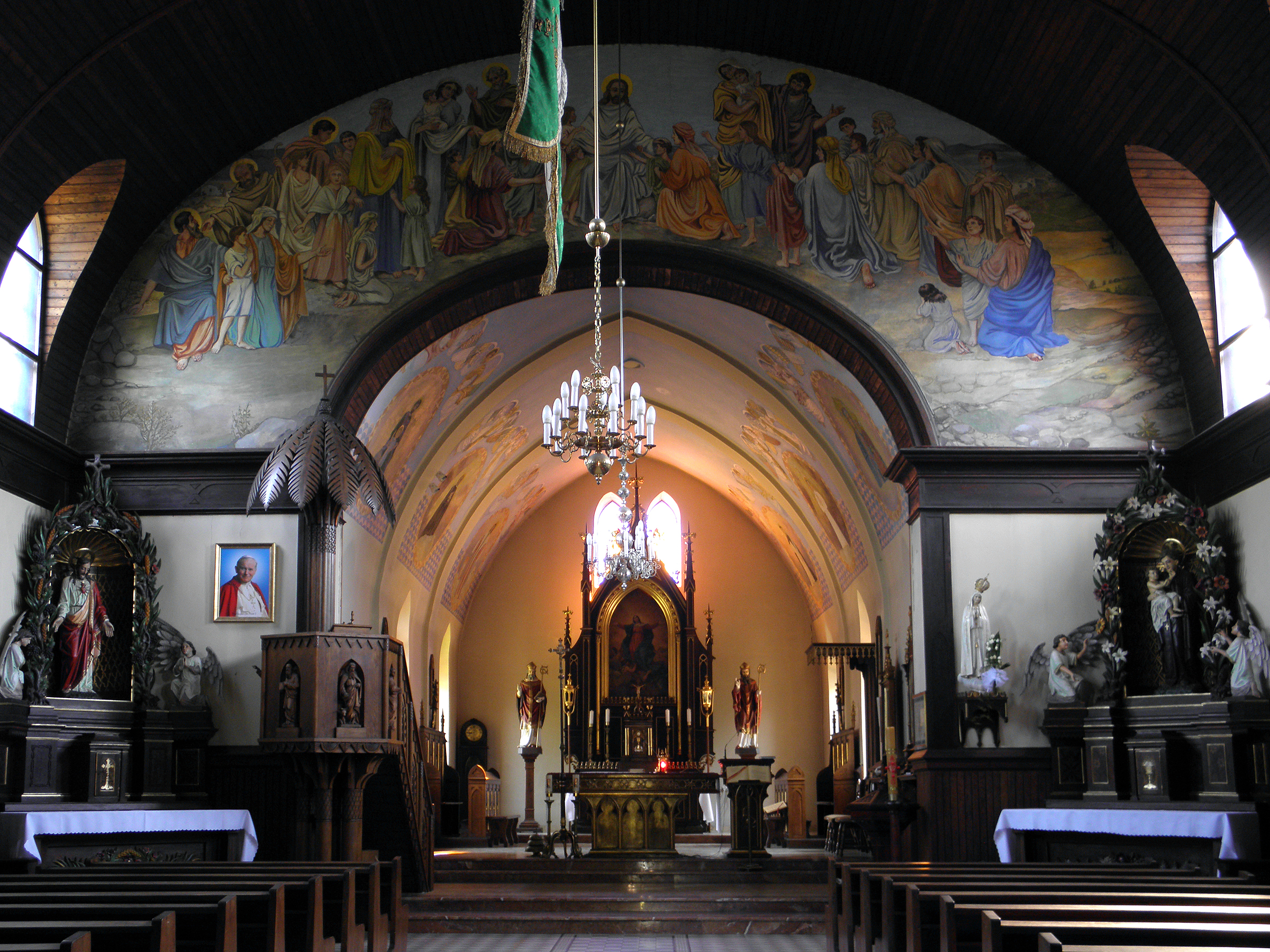
Interior of the Church of St. Joseph

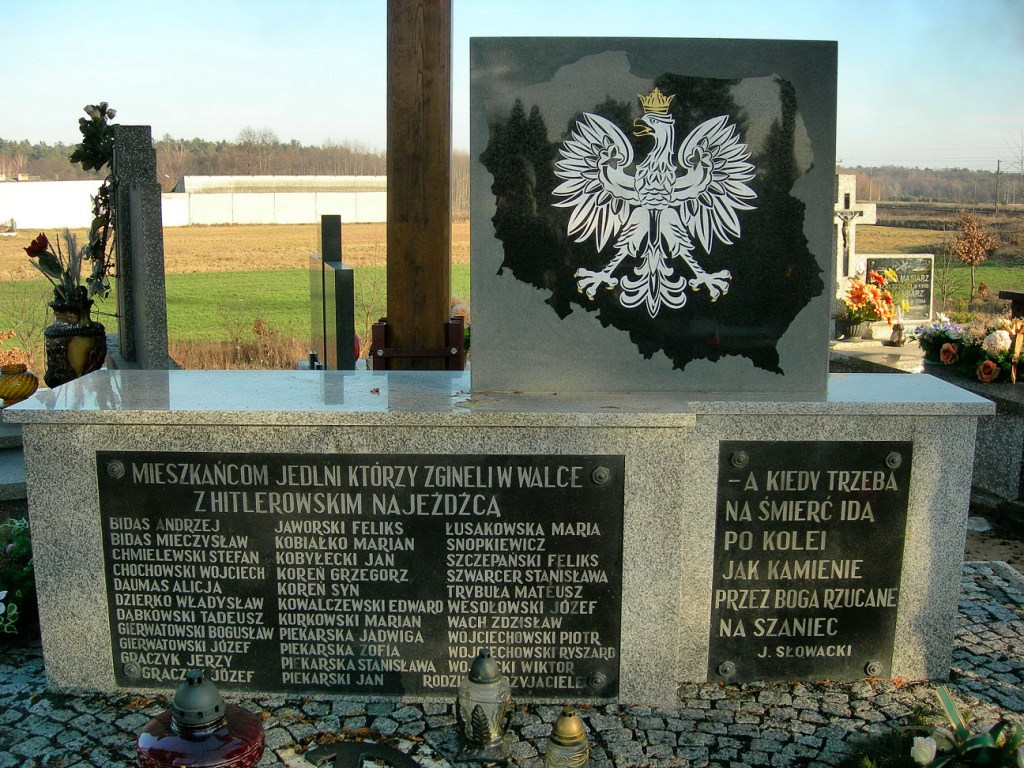
Memorial to local Poles who were killed in fight against Germany during World War II

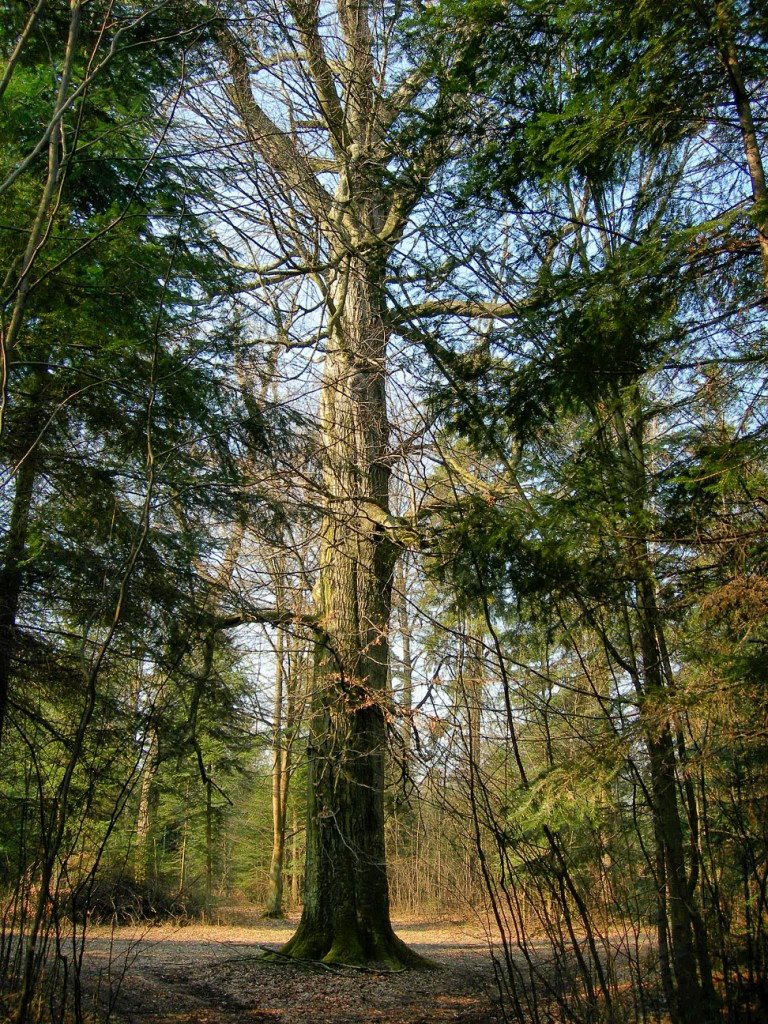
Kościuszko Beech
