= Lasowice =

Lasowice may refer to the following places in Poland:

- Lasowice, Legnica County in Lower Silesian Voivodeship (south-west Poland)
- Lasowice, Lubin County in Lower Silesian Voivodeship (south-west Poland)
- Lasowice, Masovian Voivodeship (east-central Poland)
- Lasowice, Opole Voivodeship (south-west Poland)
- Lasowice, Tarnowskie Góry in Silesian Voivodeship, a district of the town (south Poland)
