= Sadków =

Sadków may refer to the following places in Poland:

- Sadków, Oleśnica County in Lower Silesian Voivodeship (south-west Poland)
- Sadków, Wrocław County in Lower Silesian Voivodeship (south-west Poland)
- Sadków, Świętokrzyskie Voivodeship (south-central Poland)
- Sadków, Masovian Voivodeship (east-central Poland)

== See also ==
- Sadków-Górki, Masovian Voivodeship (east-central Poland)
