= Marianna Dolińska =

Polish murderer (1891–1928)

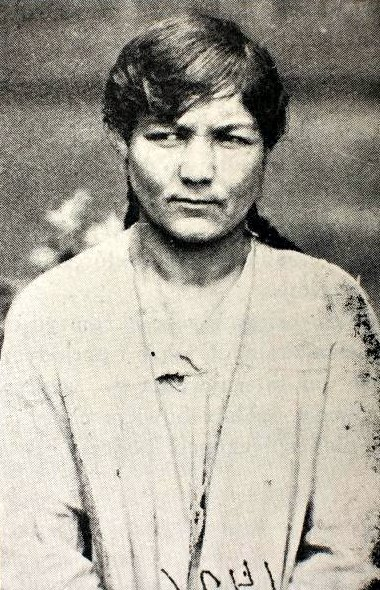
Dolińska in the psychiatric hospital

Marianna Dolińska (1891–1928) was a Romani woman from the village of Antoniówka in Radom County, Poland. In 1923, after her husband was arrested for burglary and her wagon camp was dispersed, she wandered in the wilderness with her four children, aged six months to seven years. Fearing for their starvation, on the night of 11 December, she murdered them, hanging them from a tree. She confessed at a police station the following day. Dolińska was sent to a psychiatric hospital and died there in 1928.

Crime scene photographs of the bodies of Dolińska's children came to be known as the "wreath of children".

== Murder of her children ==
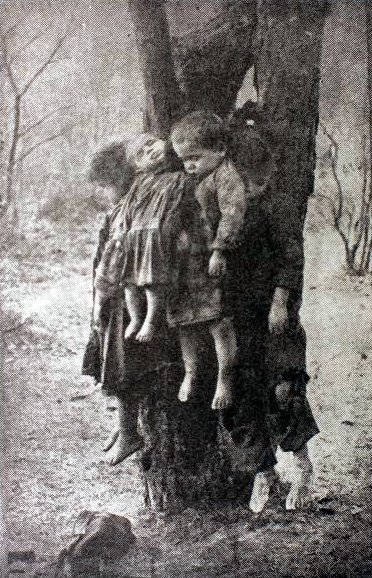
A photograph of the murdered children accompanied a 1928 article by Polish psychiatrist Witold Łuniewski. It later came to be informally known as the "wreath of children".

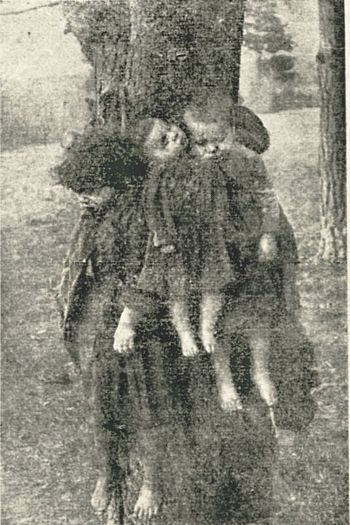
A second photograph of the children was published in 1948 in Wiktor Grzywo-Dąbrowski's A Manual of Forensic Medicine for Students and Doctors.

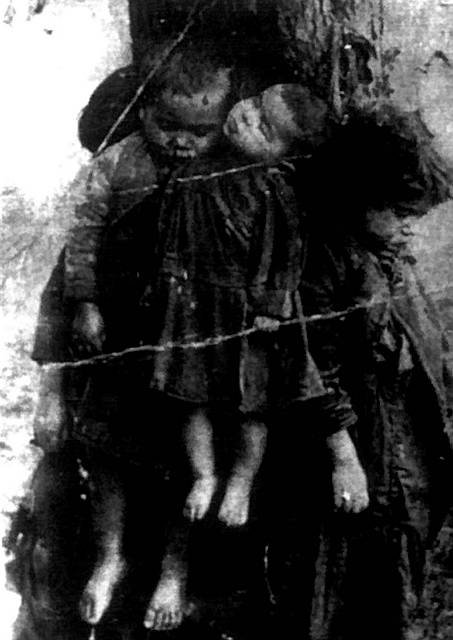
In another photograph, lines crossing the image, probably caused by folding of the developed print or scratches on the negative, were wrongly interpreted to be barbed wire securing the children to the tree.

During the winter of 1923, the inhabitants of Radom County in Poland suffered from poverty and hunger. The Polish State Police had begun dispersing the Romani population, who were accused of stealing food and animals from rural farms. In early December, Dolińska's husband was arrested for several burglaries and she was left alone with their four hungry children. Her wagon camp was dispersed and she had no source of income.

Unable to receive help from the local Romani and Polish communities, the 32-year-old woman wandered with her children in the freezing swamps between the villages of Antoniówka, Dąbrowa Kozłowska and Siczki. Dolińska, who was mentally ill, decided that the only way to protect her children from starvation was to end their lives. On 11 December 1923 at around 8 p.m. she killed Zofia (6 months), Antoni (3 years), Bronisława (5 years) and Stefan (7 years) and tied them to a tree. The next day she went to the police station in Radom and confessed to the crime. Dolińska was placed under arrest following an on-site investigation. A police photographer took several photographs of the hanged children.

== Hospitalisation and death ==
During the six-month murder investigation, Dolińska was observed exhibiting frequent and violent mental changes; she had fits of rage and auto-destructive behavior, or would fall into a stupor for days at a time. Psychiatrists who examined her concluded that she was a "neutral perpetrator of the crime, a person without awareness of the consequences at the time of the act".

Dolińska was sent to a psychiatric hospital in Tworki for observation and treatment. Staff at the institution deemed Dolińska mentally incompetent, diagnosing her with depression, apathy, delusions, and hallucinations. By 1926, she was suffering from a manic-depressive disorder following what was termed a "typical episode of manic psychosis". Staff at the Tworki institute related that she had initially planned to kill herself after she killed her children but did not follow through. Witold Łuniewski, director of the facility, diagnosed her with "frenzy-morbid psychosis", now known as bipolar disorder. He called her case "a psychopathological attempt to commit extended suicide, which the patient did not complete". Łuniewski wrote an article for the 1928 issue of the Polish Psychiatric Association's journal Rocznik Psychiatryczny. In his article he described Dolińska's case and included a photograph of the children, writing that the "horrifying sight has been photographed by our criminal investigators and the picture is currently in our possession."

Dolińska died in 1928, five years after the incident, and was buried in the hospital cemetery. The tree where her children were hanged was felled.

== Publication of the photographs ==
Three photographs of the dead children are known to exist, taken from slightly different angles. The photographs of the crime scene came to be known as the "wreath of children". The first publication of one of the photographs accompanied Witold Łuniewski's 1928 article in the journal Rocznik Psychiatryczny. In 1948, another of the photographs was used in Wiktor Grzywo-Dąbrowski's A Manual of Forensic Medicine for Students and Doctors to illustrate homicide by hanging.

While the photographs of the children have been repeatedly used to falsely illustrate crimes committed by the Ukrainian Insurgent Army in 1943, the earliest known publication of one of the photographs with a false claim of origin was on the front page of the Nazi propaganda newspaper Nowy Kurier Warszawski on 2 July 1941, where it was accompanied by the headline "This is how the Bolsheviks fight!" The broadsheet claimed that the dead children were murdered by the Soviets in a village near Vawkavysk in 1919.

Another of the photographs subsequently appeared in a 1993 issue of the magazine Na Rubieży, published by the Society for the Commemoration of Victims of Ukrainian Nationalists, bearing the caption "Polish children tortured and murdered by a branch of the Ukrainian Insurgent Army near the village Kozów, in the province Ternopil, the autumn of 1943". After that instance, the photograph was used in similar contexts in numerous research journals and magazines. Two years later the image appeared in the work of the J. Węgierski "Home Army in the districts Stanislaviv and Ternopil", bearing the caption "murdered by the SS-Galicia, Polish children in the area Kozów".

One of the photographs includes lines crossing the image, probably from folding of the developed print or scratches on the negative. Within the context of the Volhynian massacre narrative, these lines were wrongly interpreted to be barbed wire securing the children to the tree. In a 2019 article in the Polish academic journal Widok, Sara Herczyńska writes that the photograph "proved a perfect fit for the perpetrator-oriented discourse on the Volhynian genocide" and that its ubiquity could be explained as driven by the public's need to have a visual representation of the savagery of the massacres.

== Monuments ==
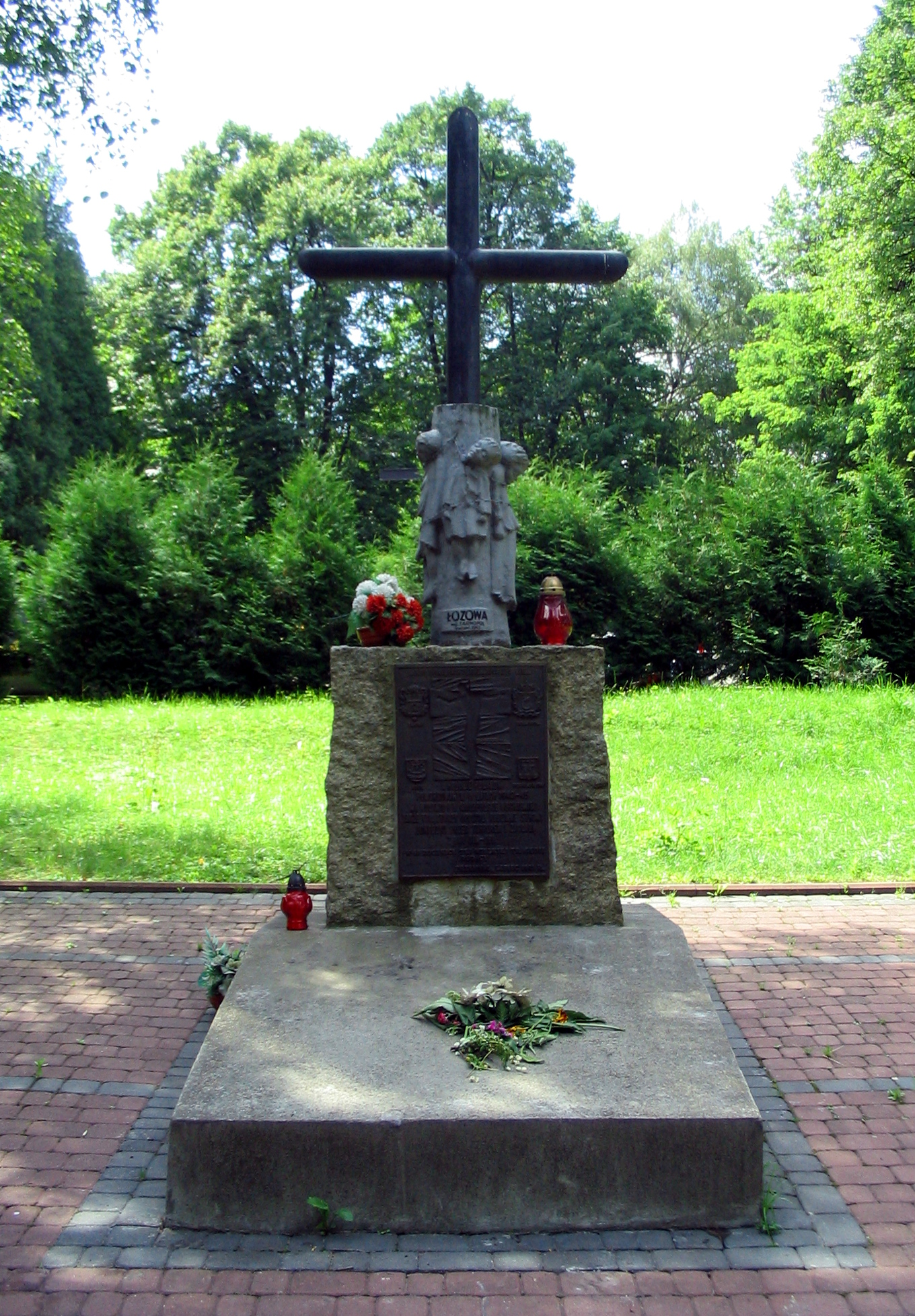
A monument in Przemyśl dedicated to victims of the Ukrainian Insurgent Army, depicted the "wreath of children". It was removed in 2008.

In July 2003, a monument for victims of the massacres of Poles in Volhynia and Eastern Galicia was unveiled in Przemyśl, depicting Dolińska's children. In early October 2008, the sculpture was removed.

The Nationwide Committee for Erecting a Memorial to the Victims of OUN-UIA Genocide was founded in 2006. The committee's mission was to build a monument in downtown Warsaw. A design modeled on the "wreath of children" photographs was submitted by sculptor Marian Konieczny and selected by the committee. The proposed sculpture, depicting children nailed to the trunk of five-meter tall winged tree, garnered controversy in the media and prompted an exposé of the history of the photographs by Ada Rutkowska and Dariusz Stola.
