= Dziesław =

Dziesław may refer to the following places in Poland:

- Dziesław in Gmina Ścinawa, Lubin County in Lower Silesian Voivodeship (SW Poland)
- Other places called Dziesław (listed in Polish Wikipedia)
