= Dziewin =

Dziewin may refer to the following places in Poland:

- Dziewin, Lower Silesian Voivodeship (south-west Poland)
- Dziewin, Lesser Poland Voivodeship (south Poland)
