= Mazovian Lowland =

The Mazovian Lowland
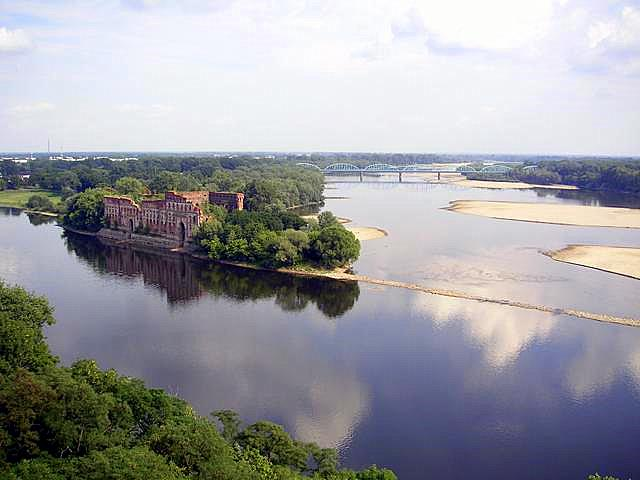
- The confluence of the Vistula and the Narew rivers at the Modlin Fortress in Masovia

The Mazovian Lowland (Polish: Nizina Mazowiecka, pronounced [ɲiˈʑi.na ma.zɔˈvjɛt͡s.ka]), also known as the Masovian Plain, is the largest geographical region in central Poland, roughly covering the historical region of Masovia. Sometimes it is also categorized as including Mazovian-Podlasian Lowlands which together form part of the greater North European Plain.

The Plain is located in the valleys of three large rivers: Vistula, Bug and Narew. Although relatively densely populated and urbanized, the Mazovian Lowland is covered by several large forest complexes that once were a part of a dense primaeval forest covering much of Poland: Kampinos Forest, Kurpie Forest, White Forest, Kozienice Forest and Green Forest. Until the mid-17th century it was also the home of the last documented aurochs herds.

== Geography ==
Tectonically, the Mazovian Lowland is a stable, safe area of the so-called Mazovian Hutch, that is area composed of interwinding layers of Cenozoic aqueous rocks and sands. The surface of the area was shaped by the presence of Scandinavian ice sheet during the Ice Age. As the area was the southernmost border of the ice sheet's presence, the northern and southern parts of the plain differ significantly: the former is a vast open space while the latter is more rough terrain. The southern part is also covered by many gorges created during the Baltic Glacier. The central part of the Mazovian Lowland, the so-called Warsaw Cauldron, as well as the valleys of Radomka and Pilica rivers are covered by a number of parabolic dunes.

Much of the agriculture is devoted to fruit production. The soils are mostly of bielica type, that is white sands on a layer of glacial age clay and sedimentary rocks. The river net of the area is extensive and includes Vistula, Narew, Bug, Pilica, Wieprz and Wkra rivers, all of which have their source outside of the region. The climate of Mazovian Lowland is temperate continental, with average temperatures in summer period ranging from 18 °C to 18,5 °C. The average rainfall is among the lowest in Poland and does not exceed 500 millimeters (20 in) yearly in the central parts of the area and 600 millimeters (24 in) in the border areas.
