= Jan Kowalski (RAF officer) =

Polish officer (1916–2000)

- Born: 19 November 1916; Mircze, Russian Empire
- Died: 15 May 2000 (aged 83); Nottingham, England, United Kingdom
- Military career
- Allegiance: Poland; United Kingdom
- Branch: Polish Air Force (1937–1940); Royal Air Force (1940–1948)
- Service years: 1937–1948
- Rank: Pilot captain (Polish Air Force); Officer cadet (until 1942); Pilot officer (1942–1943); Flying officer (1943–1944); Flight lieutenant (since 1943)
- Service number: 793450; P-1909
- Units: 112th Fighter Escadrille (1937); Reserve Reconnaissance Squadron of the Officer Cadet Aviation School in Dęblin (1939); No. 303 Squadron RAF (1940–1941); No. 315 Polish Fighter Squadron (1941–1942); No. 58 Operational Training Unit RAF (1942–1943); Polish Fighting Team (1943); No. 131 Wing RAF (1943–1944, 1945–1946); No. 317 Polish Fighter Squadron (1944–1945)
- Conflicts: Second World War: Battle of Britain
- Awards: Virtuti Militari; 3 Crosses of Valour; 3 Aviation Medals; Field Pilot Badge; Distinguished Flying Cross

Jan Kowalski (Polish: [ˈjan kɔˈval.ski]; 19 November 1916 – 15 May 2000) was an aircraft pilot who served in the Polish Air Force and Royal Air Force with the ranks of captain and flight lieutenant respectively. He had fought in the World War II, including the Battle of Britain.

== History ==
He was born on 19 November 1916 in Mircze, Russian Empire and graduated gymnasium in Włodzimierz, Poland (now Volodymyr-Volynskyi, Ukraine). In 1932 he joined the Underage Aviator Non-commissioned Officer School in Bydgoszcz. After graduation, he had become a mechanic and made a fighter aircraft pilot licence in Pilot School Squadron of non-commissioned officers in Sadków, Radom. After that, he was sent to Aviation Shooting and Bombardment School, Grudziądz to take an aviation course with fighter aircraft specialization. After finishing it, he was assigned to 112th Fighter Escadrille of Polish Air Force in Warsaw.

In 1937, he was reassigned to the Underage Aviator Non-commissioned Officer School in Bydgoszcz, where he was airliner aviation instructor. After the Invasion of Poland by Nazi Germany on 1 September 1939, which begun the World War 2, he was assigned to the Reserve Reconnaissance Squadron of the Officer Cadet Aviation School in Dęblin, in which, he piloted PZL.23 Karaś planes. On 17 September, he flew to Chernivtsi, Romania, and on 31 October, he had arrived in Marseille, France. He was then assigned to the airbase in Istres, France, and later he was reassigned to the headquarters of the training base of the Polish Air Forces, located at the Lyon–Bron Airport. On 4 March 1940, he was assigned to the training centre in Rennes.

After the Fall of France in 1940, he had escaped to Great Britain, United Kingdom, where he joined the Royal Air Force, and got assigned service number 793450, and later, P-1909. After being trained to pilot British fighter aircraft, on 21 August, he got assigned to the 303 Squadron. As a member of the squadron, he fought in the Battle of Britain. On 26 September 1940, while piloting Hawker Hurricane no. P3089, he had shot down the Messerschmitt Bf 109 fighter, and on 27 September, he had damaged the Heinkel He 111 bomber.

On 22 January 1941, he was assigned to newly formed No. 315 Polish Fighter Squadron. On 5 December 1942, after ending the turn of combat flights, he was assigned to the No. 58 Operational Training Unit, where he was an instructor. On 13 February 1943, he become a member of the Polish Fighting Team, in which, had made 39 combat flights in Africa. Since 21 July 1943, he was a member of No. 316 Polish Fighter Squadron, and later he was assigned to the No. 131 Wing. On 28 April 1944, he was assigned to the No. 317 Polish Fighter Squadron. On 1 May 1945, he returned to the Blackpool airbase, and on 9 November, he was reassigned back to the No. 131 Wing. In July 1946, he had attended the air traffic controller course, and become the controller at the RAF Swinderby airbase. In 1948, he got demilitarized, and become the trader. He died on 15 May 2000, in Nottingham, England, United Kingdom.

== Military ranks ==
=== Polish Air Forces ===
- Pilot captain

=== Royal Air Forces ===
- Officer cadet (until June 1942)
- Pilot officer (June 1942 – 1 June 1943)
- Flying officer (1 June 1943 – 1 June 1944)
- Flight lieutenant (since 1 June 1943)

== Air combat achievements ==
Jan Kowalski is classified as 248th at the Bajan's list of flying aces of Poland during World War II. The list include his one confirmed shot down plane, and one damaged.

=== Confirmed shot down planes ===
- 1/8 Dornier Do 215 on 18 September 1940, while piloting Hawker Hurricane no. P3089. The shot down was listed as performed by the whole squadron.
- 1 Messerschmitt Bf 109 on 26 September 1940, while piloting Hawker Hurricane no. P3089.

=== Confirmed damaged planes ===
- 1 Heinkel He 111 on 27 September 1940, while piloting Hawker Hurricane no. P3089.

== Awards ==
- Virtuti Militari, no. 11062 (1 June 1945)
- 3 Crosses of Valour (1 February 1941, 19 February 1942, 20 December 1943)
- 3 Aviation Medals
- Field Pilot Badge
- Distinguished Flying Cross (10 April 1946)

== Citations ==
=== Bibliography ===
- Janusz Kubit, Szkoła Podoficerów Lotnictwa dla Małoletnich, Krosno 1938-1939. Krosno: Graffia - Agencja wydawniczo-fotograficzna, 2019. ISBN 978-83-955211-0-2. OCLC 1135440195.
- Tadeusz Jerzy Krzystek, Anna Krzystek, Polskie Siły Powietrzne w Wielkiej Brytanii w latach 1940-1947 łącznie z Pomocniczą Lotniczą Służbą Kobiet (PLSK-WAAF). Sandomierz: Stratus, 2012. ISBN 978-83-61421-59-7. OCLC 276981965.
- Józef Zieliński, 303 Dywizjon Myśliwski Warszawski im. Tadeusza Kościuszki. Warsaw: Bellona, 2003. ISBN 83-11-09630-9. OCLC 830493548.
- Józef Zieliński, Wojtek Matusiak, Robert Gretzyngier, Polscy lotnicy w Bitwie o Anglię. Warsaw: Bellona, 2015. ISBN 978-83-11-13984-8. OCLC 924759692.
- Józef Zieliński, Lotnicy polscy w Bitwie o Wielką Brytanię. Warsaw: Oficyna Wydawnicza MH, 2005. ISBN 83-906620-4-3. OCLC 838825949.
- Robert Sikora, Bitwy polskiego lotnictwa: 1918-1945. Warsaw: Oficyna Wydawnicza Alma-Press, 2016. ISBN 978-83-7020-626-0. OCLC 953188670.
- Robert Gretzyngier, Wojtek Matusiak, Polacy w obronie Wielkiej Brytanii. Poznań: Dom Wydawniczy Rebis, 2007. ISBN 978-83-7301-946-1. OCLC 189476159.
- Richard King, Dywizjon 303. Walka i codzienność. Wydawnictwo RM, 2014. ISBN 978-83-7773-324-0. OCLC 898278760.
