= Krzyżowa =

Krzyżowa (derived from the Polish word krzyż, meaning "cross") may refer to any of the following villages in Poland:

- Krzyżowa, Bolesławiec County in Lower Silesian Voivodeship (south-west Poland)
- Krzyżowa, Lubin County in Lower Silesian Voivodeship
- Krzyżowa, Świdnica County in Lower Silesian Voivodeship
- Krzyżowa, Silesian Voivodeship (south Poland)
