= Dąbrowa Środkowa =

- Village
- Location within Poland
- Coordinates: 51°25′10″N 16°20′05″E
- Country: Poland
- Voivodeship: Lower Silesian
- County: Lubin
- Gmina: Ścinawa
- Population: 70

Dąbrowa Środkowa [dɔmˈbrɔva ɕrɔtˈkɔva] is a village in the administrative district of Gmina Ścinawa, within Lubin County, Lower Silesian Voivodeship, in south-western Poland.
