= Wielowieś, Lubin County =

Wielowieś
- Village
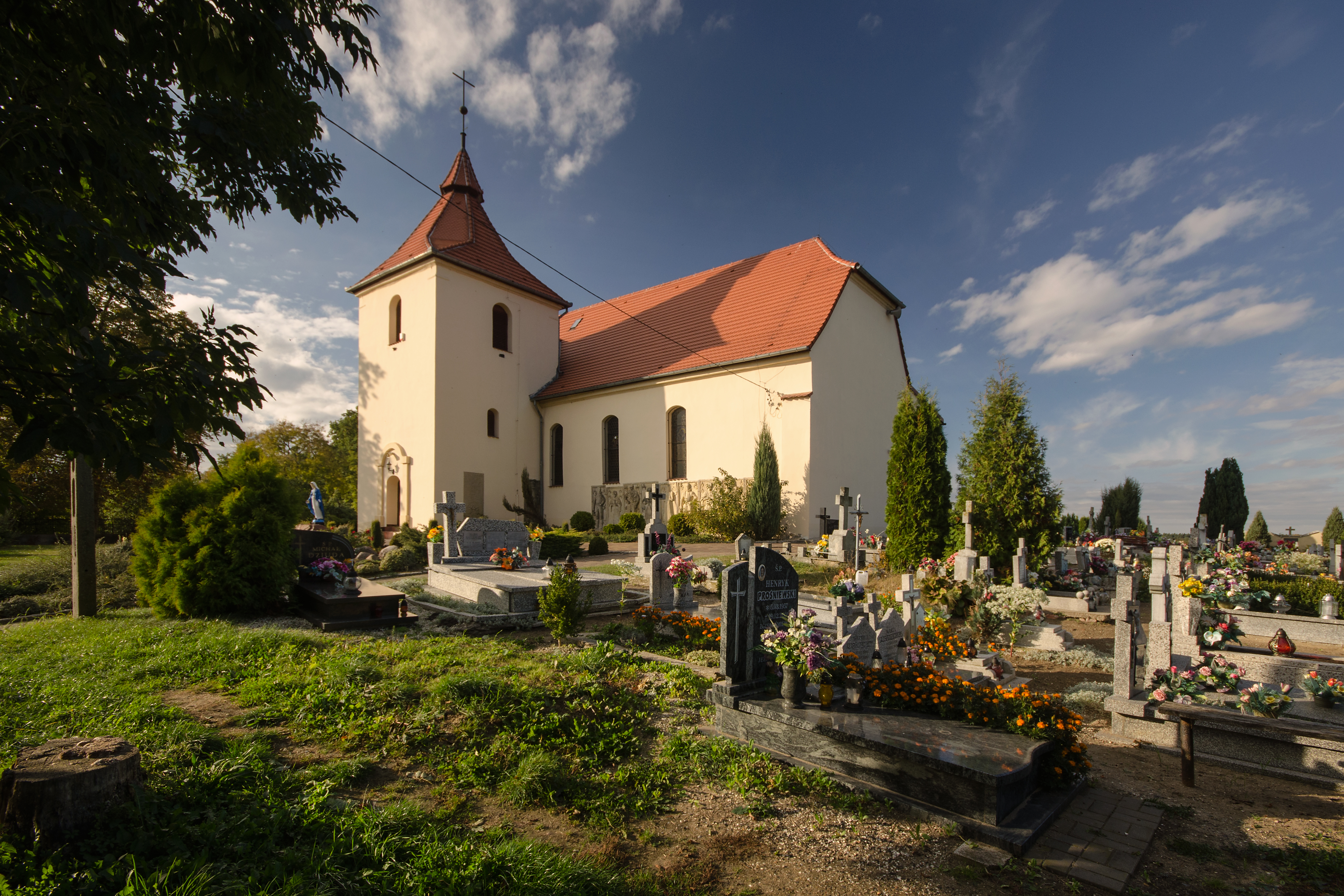
- Catholic church

- Location within Poland
- Coordinates: 51°20′10″N 16°21′57″E
- Country: Poland
- Voivodeship: Lower Silesian
- County: Lubin
- Gmina: Ścinawa

Wielowieś [vjɛˈlɔvjɛɕ] is a village in the administrative district of Gmina Ścinawa, within Lubin County, Lower Silesian Voivodeship, in south-western Poland.
