= Gzowice-Kolonia =

- Village
- Location within Poland
- Coordinates: 51°24′12″N 21°21′1″E
- Country: Poland
- Voivodeship: Masovian
- County: Radom
- Gmina: Jedlnia-Letnisko

Gzowice-Kolonia [ɡzɔˈvit͡sɛ kɔˈlɔɲa] is a village in the administrative district of Gmina Jedlnia-Letnisko, within Radom County, Masovian Voivodeship, in east-central Poland.
