= Gmina Jedlnia-Letnisko =

Gmina Jedlnia-Letnisko Jedlnia-Letnisko Commune
- Gmina
- Interactive map of Gmina Jedlnia-Letnisko
- Coordinates (Jedlnia-Letnisko): 51°25′47″N 21°20′4″E
- Country: Poland
- Voivodeship: Masovian
- County: Radom County
- Seat: Jedlnia-Letnisko

Area
  - Total: 65.57 km^{2} (25.32 sq mi)

Population (2006)
  - Total: 11,474
  - Density: 175.0/km^{2} (453.2/sq mi)
- Website: http://www.jedlnia.pl/

Gmina Jedlnia-Letnisko is a rural gmina (administrative district) in Radom County, Masovian Voivodeship, in east-central Poland. Its seat is the village of Jedlnia-Letnisko, which lies approximately 13 kilometres (8 mi) east of Radom and 91 km (57 mi) south of Warsaw.

The gmina covers an area of 65.57 square kilometres (25.3 sq mi), and as of 2006 its total population is 11,474.

== Villages ==
Gmina Jedlnia-Letnisko contains the villages and settlements of Aleksandrów, Antoniówka, Cudnów, Dawidów, Groszowice, Gzowice, Gzowice-Folwark, Gzowice-Kolonia, Jedlnia-Letnisko, Lasowice, Maryno, Myśliszewice, Natolin, Piotrowice, Rajec Poduchowny, Rajec Szlachecki, Sadków, Sadków-Górki, Siczki, Słupica and Wrzosów.

== Neighbouring gminas ==
Gmina Jedlnia-Letnisko is bordered by the towns of Pionki and Radom, and by the gminas of Gózd, Jastrzębia and Pionki.
