= Dłużyce =

- Village
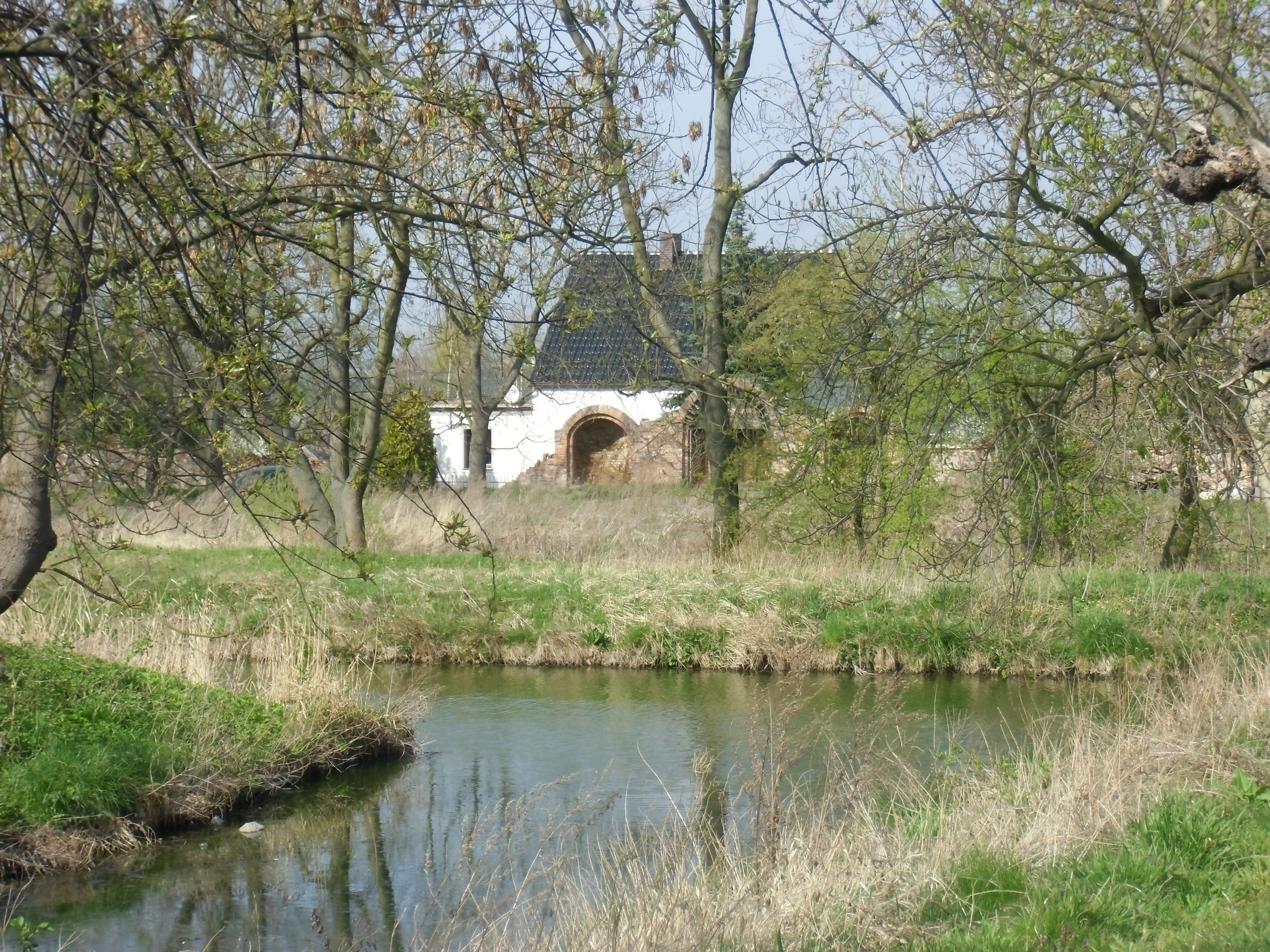
- Park

- Location within Poland
- Coordinates: 51°23′25″N 16°26′24″E
- Country: Poland
- Voivodeship: Lower Silesian
- County: Lubin
- Gmina: Ścinawa
- Highest elevation: 108 m (354 ft)
- Lowest elevation: 102 m (335 ft)
- Population: 110

Dłużyce [dwuˈʐɨt͡sɛ] is a village in the administrative district of Gmina Ścinawa, within Lubin County, Lower Silesian Voivodeship, in south-western Poland.
