= Cudnów =

- Village
- Location within Poland
- Coordinates: 51°24′58″N 21°25′13″E
- Country: Poland
- Voivodeship: Masovian
- County: Radom
- Gmina: Jedlnia-Letnisko

Cudnów [ˈt͡sudnuf] is a village in the administrative district of Gmina Jedlnia-Letnisko, within Radom County, Masovian Voivodeship, in east-central Poland.
