= Maryno =

- Village
- Location within Poland
- Coordinates: 51°26′N 21°24′E
- Country: Poland
- Voivodeship: Masovian
- County: Radom
- Gmina: Jedlnia-Letnisko

Maryno [maˈrɨnɔ] is a village in the administrative district of Gmina Jedlnia-Letnisko, within Radom County, Masovian Voivodeship, in east-central Poland.
