= Słupica =

- Village
- Location within Poland
- Coordinates: 51°25′N 21°24′E
- Country: Poland
- Voivodeship: Masovian
- County: Radom
- Gmina: Jedlnia-Letnisko

Słupica [swuˈpit͡sa] is a village in the administrative district of Gmina Jedlnia-Letnisko, within Radom County, Masovian Voivodeship, in east-central Poland.
