= Gzowice-Folwark =

- Village
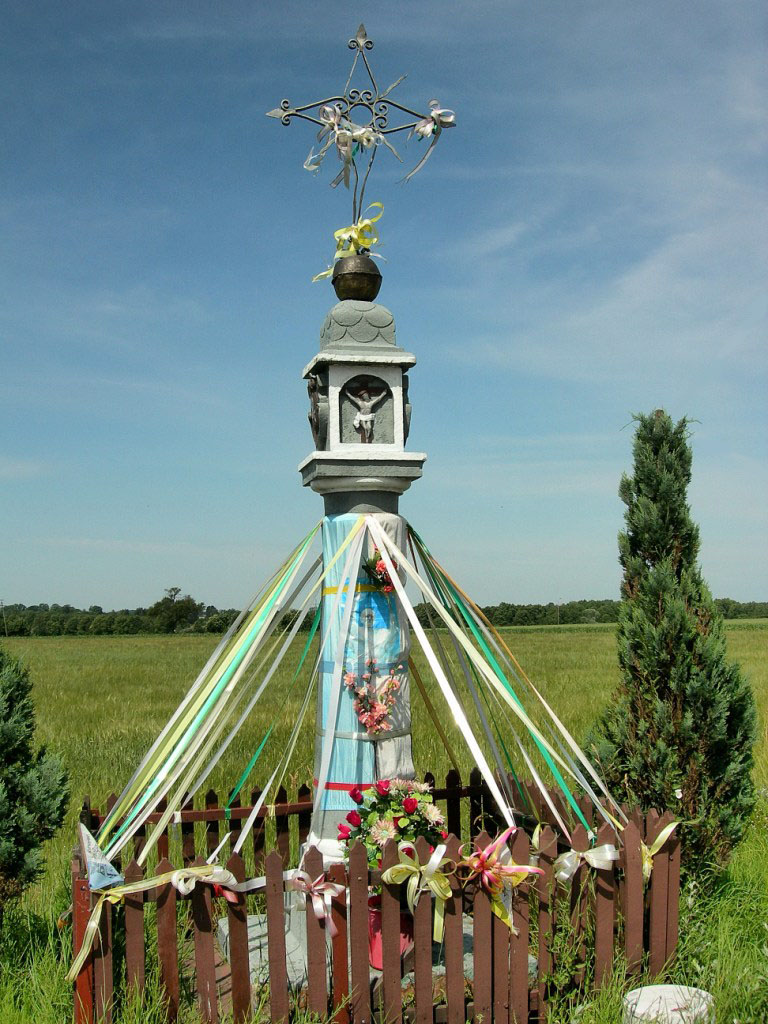
- 17th-century column in Gzowice-Folwark

- Location within Poland
- Coordinates: 51°24′22″N 21°19′38″E
- Country: Poland
- Voivodeship: Masovian
- County: Radom
- Gmina: Jedlnia-Letnisko

Gzowice-Folwark [ɡzɔˈvit͡sɛ ˈfɔlvark] is a village in the administrative district of Gmina Jedlnia-Letnisko, within Radom County, Masovian Voivodeship, in east-central Poland.
