= Przychowa =

- Village
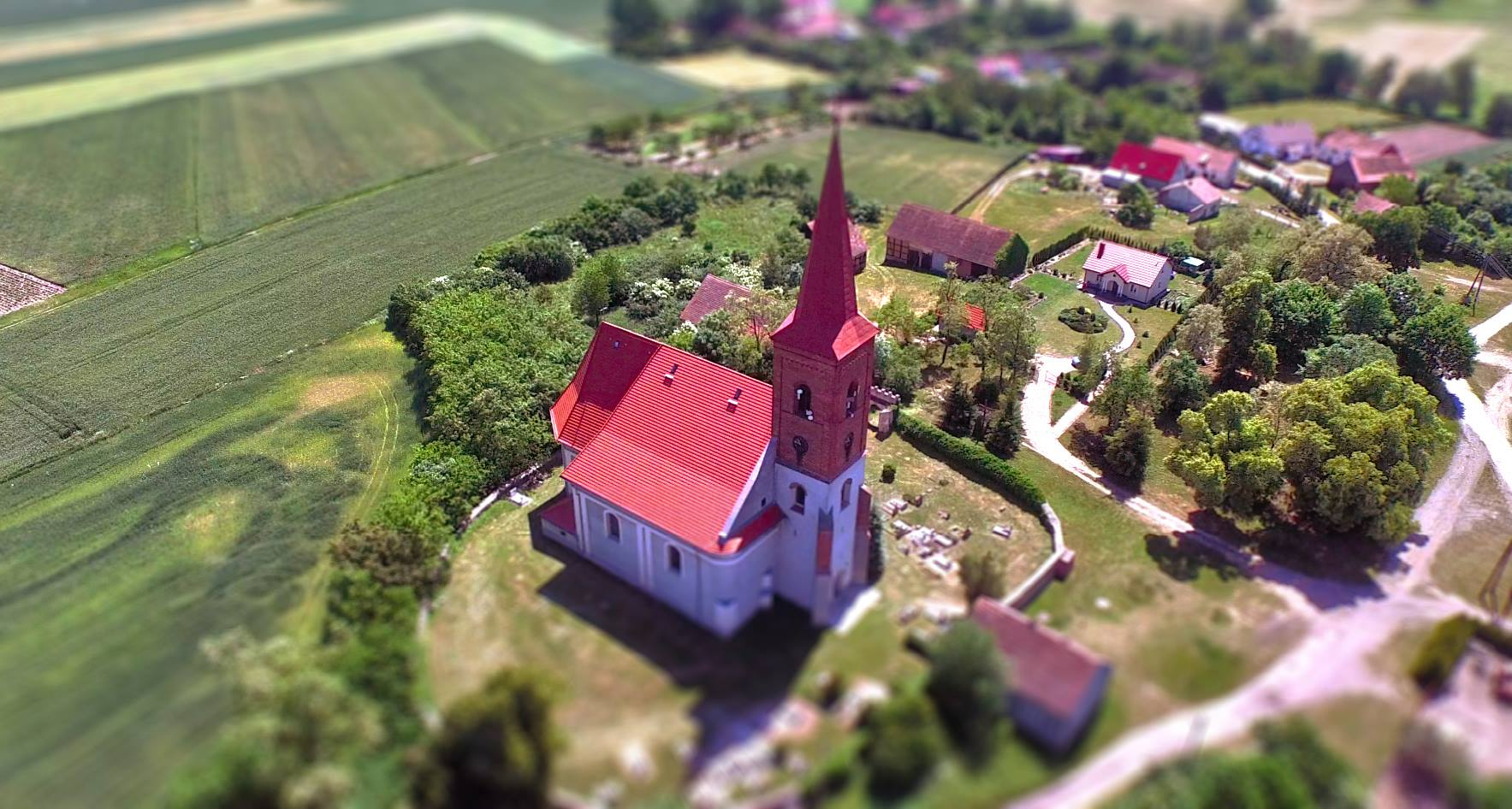

- Location within Poland
- Coordinates: 51°27′17″N 16°25′39″E
- Country: Poland
- Voivodeship: Lower Silesian
- County: Lubin
- Gmina: Ścinawa
- Website: http://www.przychowa.scinawa.eu

Przychowa [pʂɨˈxɔva] is a village in the administrative district of Gmina Ścinawa, within Lubin County, Lower Silesian Voivodeship, in south-western Poland.
