= Buszkowice, Lower Silesian Voivodeship =

Buszkowice
- Village
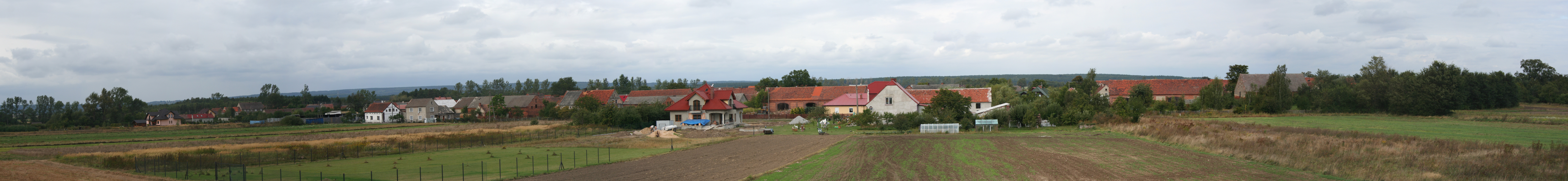

- Location within Poland
- Coordinates: 51°28′25″N 16°26′32″E
- Country: Poland
- Voivodeship: Lower Silesian
- County: Lubin
- Gmina: Ścinawa
- Elevation: 99 m (325 ft)
- Population: 140

Buszkowice [buʂkɔˈvit͡sɛ] is a village in the administrative district of Gmina Ścinawa, within Lubin County, Lower Silesian Voivodeship, in south-western Poland.

== Images ==
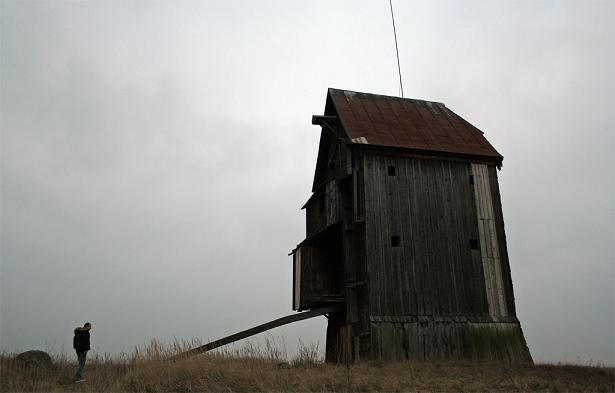
Post mill

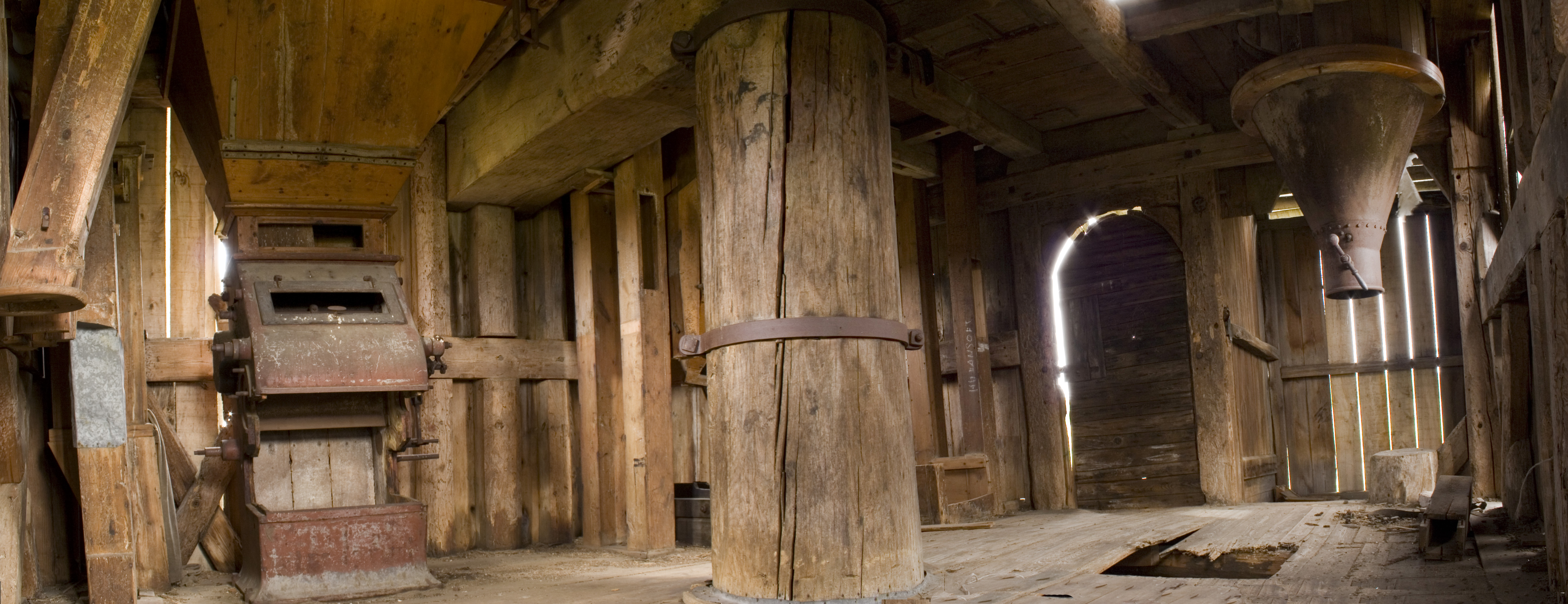
Post mill - inside

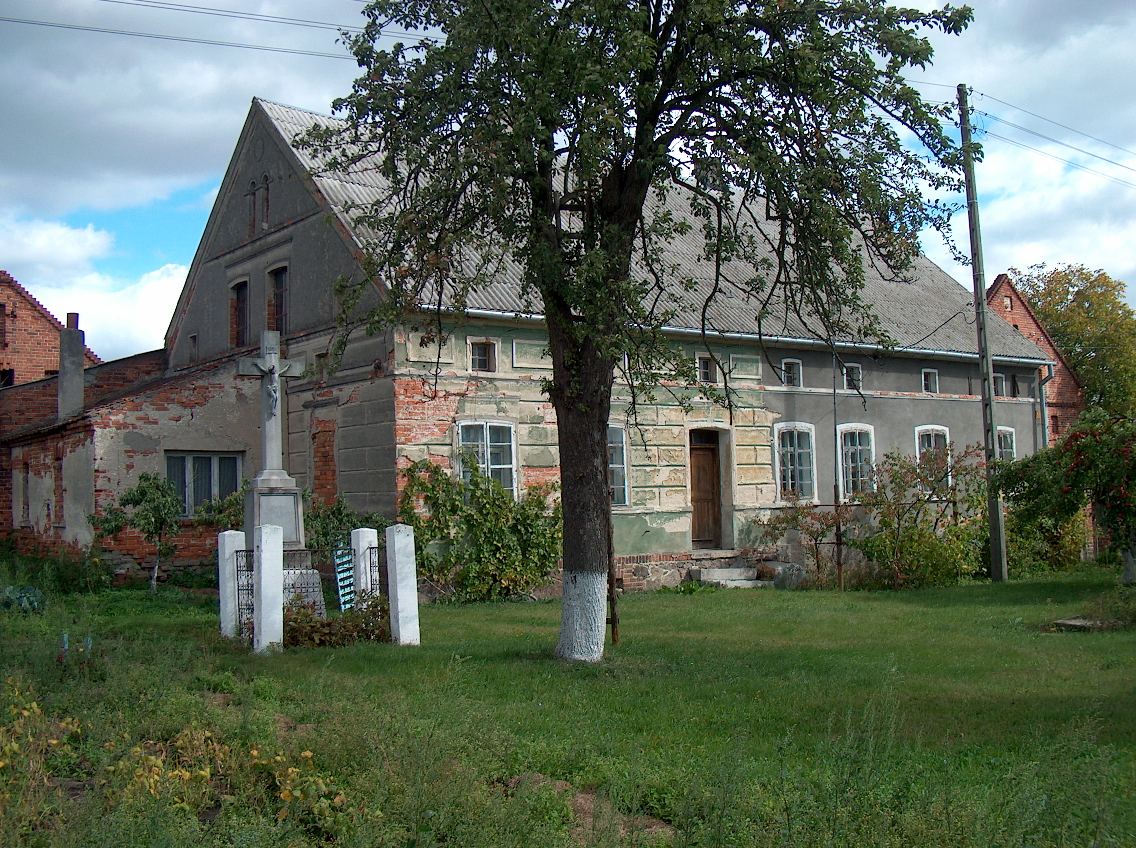
Crucifix
