= Sitno, Lower Silesian Voivodeship =

Sitno
- Village
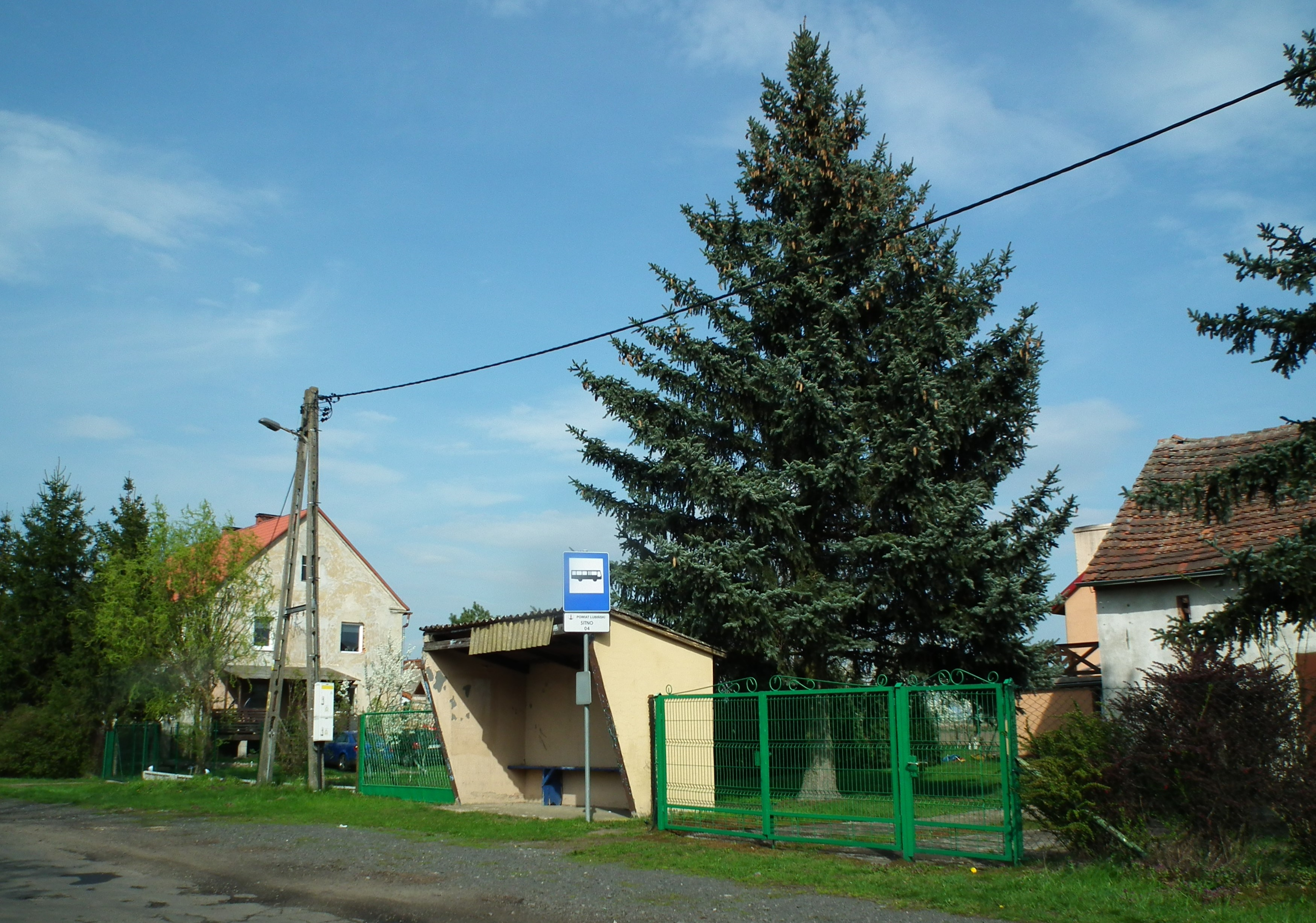

- Location within Poland
- Coordinates: 51°22′47″N 16°22′48″E
- Country: Poland
- Voivodeship: Lower Silesian
- County: Lubin
- Gmina: Ścinawa

Sitno [ˈɕitnɔ] is a village in the administrative district of Gmina Ścinawa, within Lubin County, Lower Silesian Voivodeship, in south-western Poland.
