= Dębiec, Lower Silesian Voivodeship =

Dębiec
- Village
- Location within Poland
- Coordinates: 51°25′52″N 16°23′27″E
- Country: Poland
- Voivodeship: Lower Silesian
- County: Lubin
- Gmina: Ścinawa

Dębiec [ˈdɛmbjɛt͡s] is a village in the administrative district of Gmina Ścinawa, within Lubin County, Lower Silesian Voivodeship, in south-western Poland.
