= Groszowice, Masovian Voivodeship =

Groszowice
- Village
- Location within Poland
- Coordinates: 51°24′59″N 21°16′27″E
- Country: Poland
- Voivodeship: Masovian
- County: Radom
- Gmina: Jedlnia-Letnisko

Groszowice [ɡrɔʂɔˈvit͡sɛ] is a village in the administrative district of Gmina Jedlnia-Letnisko, within Radom County, Masovian Voivodeship, in east-central Poland.
