= Parszowice =

- Village
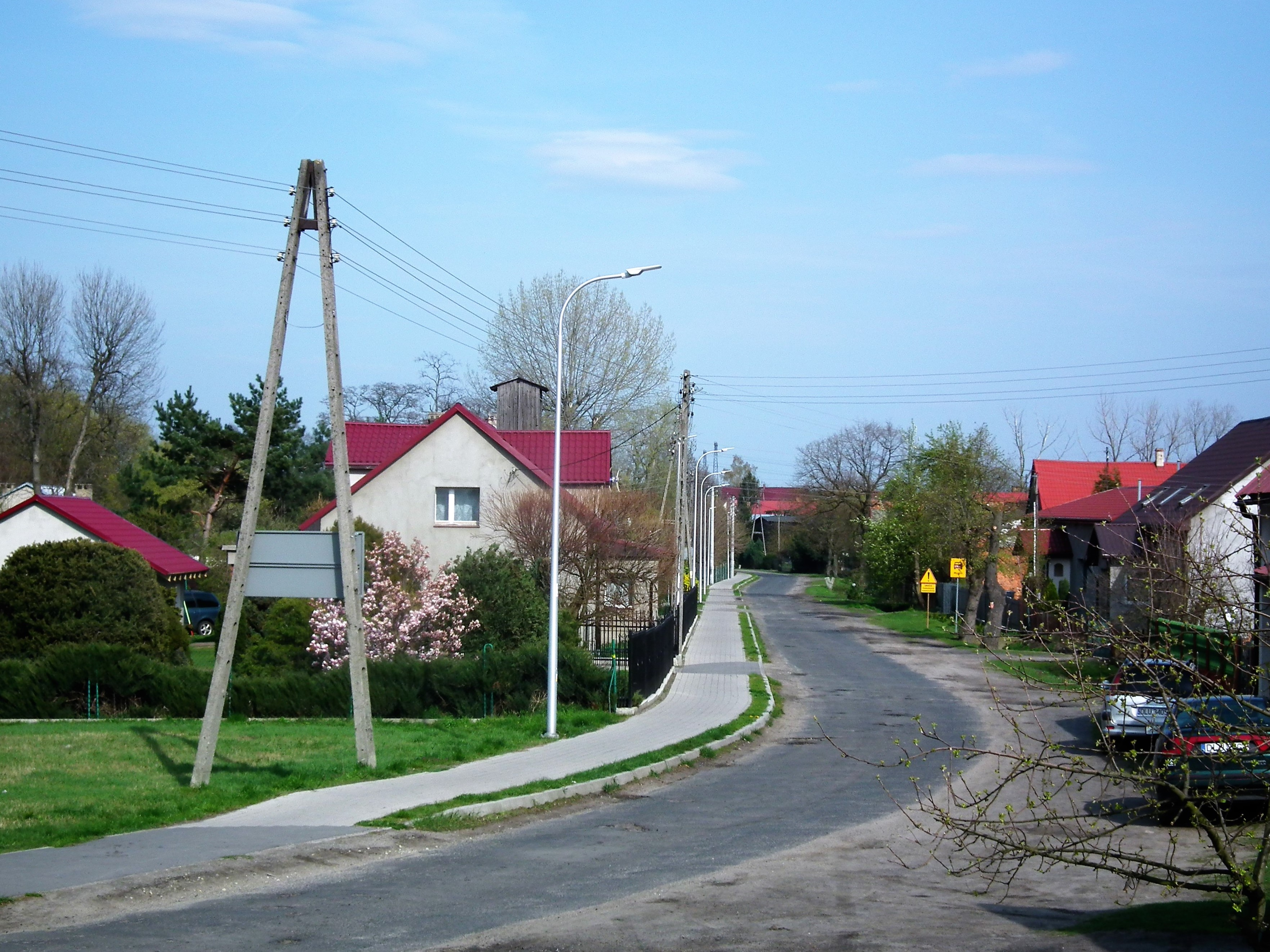

- Location within Poland
- Coordinates: 51°22′N 16°23′E
- Country: Poland
- Voivodeship: Lower Silesian
- County: Lubin
- Gmina: Ścinawa
- Population: 450

Parszowice [parʂɔˈvit͡sɛ] is a village in the administrative district of Gmina Ścinawa, within Lubin County, Lower Silesian Voivodeship, in south-western Poland.
