= Redlice =

- Village
- Location within Poland
- Coordinates: 51°20′26″N 16°20′8″E
- Country: Poland
- Voivodeship: Lower Silesian
- County: Lubin
- Gmina: Ścinawa

Redlice [rɛdˈlit͡sɛ] is a village in the administrative district of Gmina Ścinawa, within Lubin County, Lower Silesian Voivodeship, in south-western Poland.
