= Sadków, Radom =

Sadków
- District
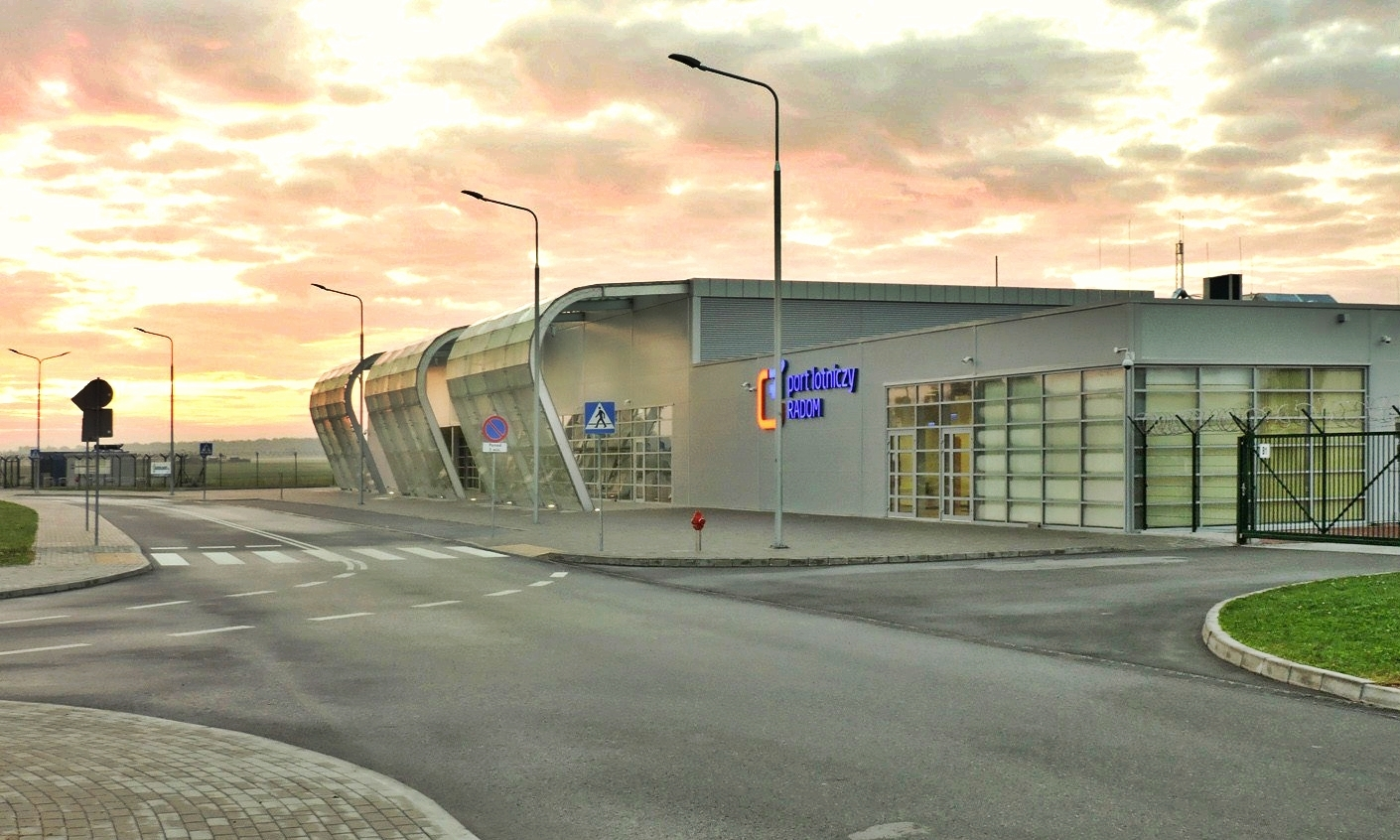
- Radom Airport in Sadków.
- Interactive map of Sadków
- Coordinates: 51°23′32″N 21°12′24″E
- Country: Poland
- Voivodeship: Masovian
- County: Radom
- Elevation: 165 m (541 ft)
- Time zone: UTC+1 (CET)
  - Summer (DST): UTC+2 (CEST)
- Postal code: 26-604
- Area code: (+48) 48
- Car plates: WR

Sadków (Polish: [ˈsat.kuf]) is a city district of Radom, Poland, located in the east part of the city.

== History ==
Before the World War II, the current territories of the district were a part of the village of Sadków located outside the borders of Radom. After the war, part of the village of was incorporated into the city forming the district.

== Description ==
A big part of the district is made by a military base and Radom Airport.
