= Turów, Lubin County =

Turów
- Village
- Location within Poland
- Coordinates: 51°24′45″N 16°22′49″E
- Country: Poland
- Voivodeship: Lower Silesian
- County: Lubin
- Gmina: Ścinawa
- Time zone: UTC+1 (CET)
  - Summer (DST): UTC+2 (CEST)
- Vehicle registration: DLU

Turów [ˈturuf] is a village in the administrative district of Gmina Ścinawa, within Lubin County, Lower Silesian Voivodeship, in south-western Poland.

The name of the village is of Polish origin and comes from the word tur, which means "aurochs".
