= Chełmek Wołowski =

- Village
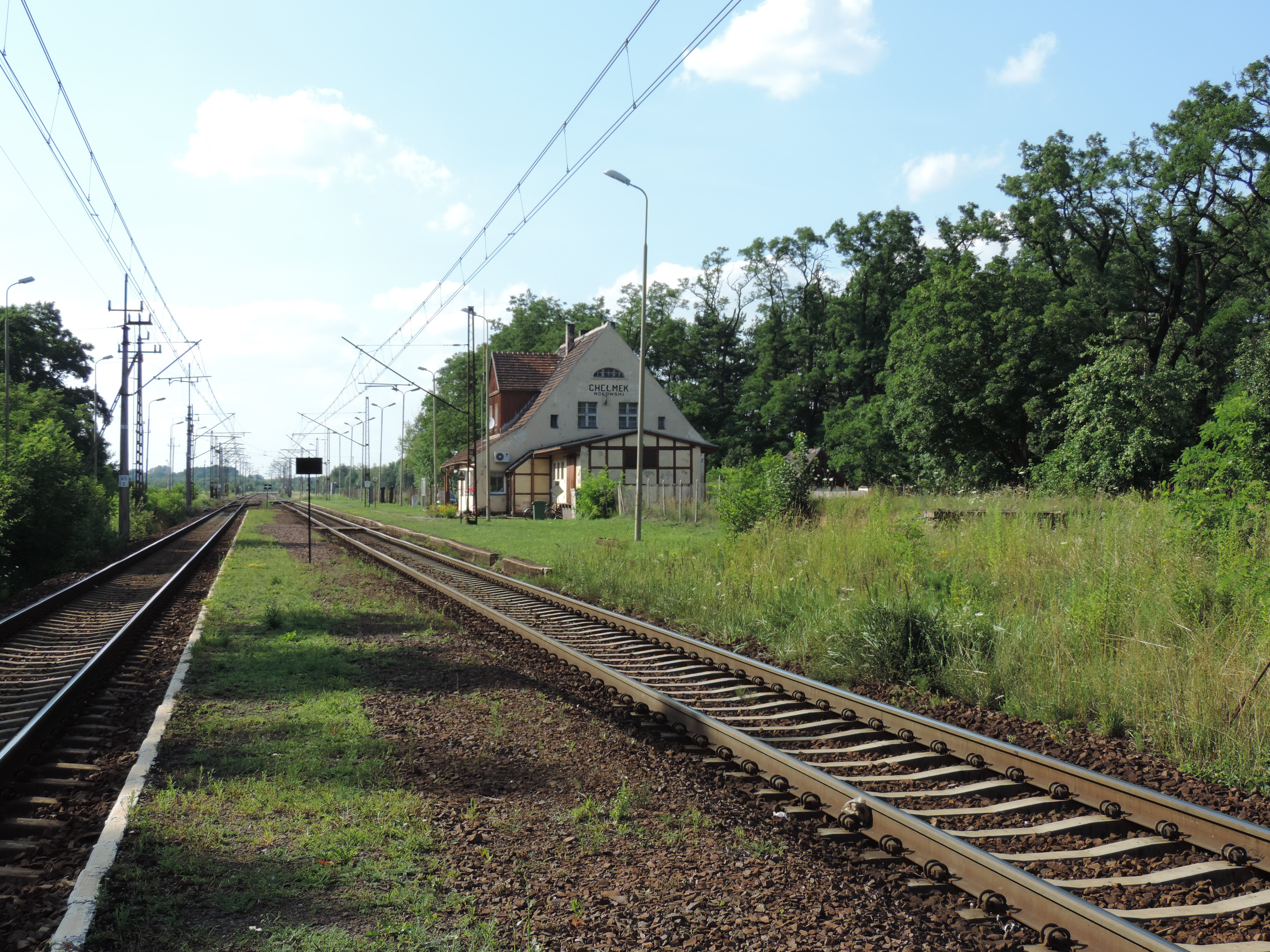
- Train station

- Location within Poland
- Coordinates: 51°27′05″N 16°22′50″E
- Country: Poland
- Voivodeship: Lower Silesian
- County: Lubin
- Gmina: Ścinawa
- Time zone: UTC+1 (CET)
  - Summer (DST): UTC+2 (CEST)
- Vehicle registration: DLU

Chełmek Wołowski [ˈxɛu̯mɛk vɔˈwɔfski] is a village in the administrative district of Gmina Ścinawa, within Lubin County, Lower Silesian Voivodeship, in south-western Poland.

During World War II, in 1940–1941, a Nazi German forced labour camp for Jews was located in the village.
