= Zaborów, Lower Silesian Voivodeship =

Zaborów
- Village
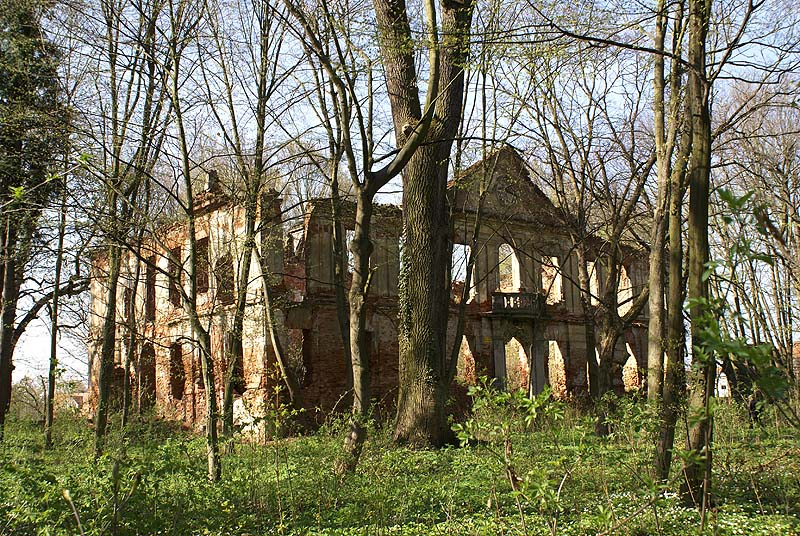
- Palace

- Location within Poland
- Coordinates: 51°21′14″N 16°25′8″E
- Country: Poland
- Voivodeship: Lower Silesian
- County: Lubin
- Gmina: Ścinawa

Zaborów [zaˈbɔruf] is a village in the administrative district of Gmina Ścinawa, within Lubin County, Lower Silesian Voivodeship, in south-western Poland.
