= Ręszów =

- Village
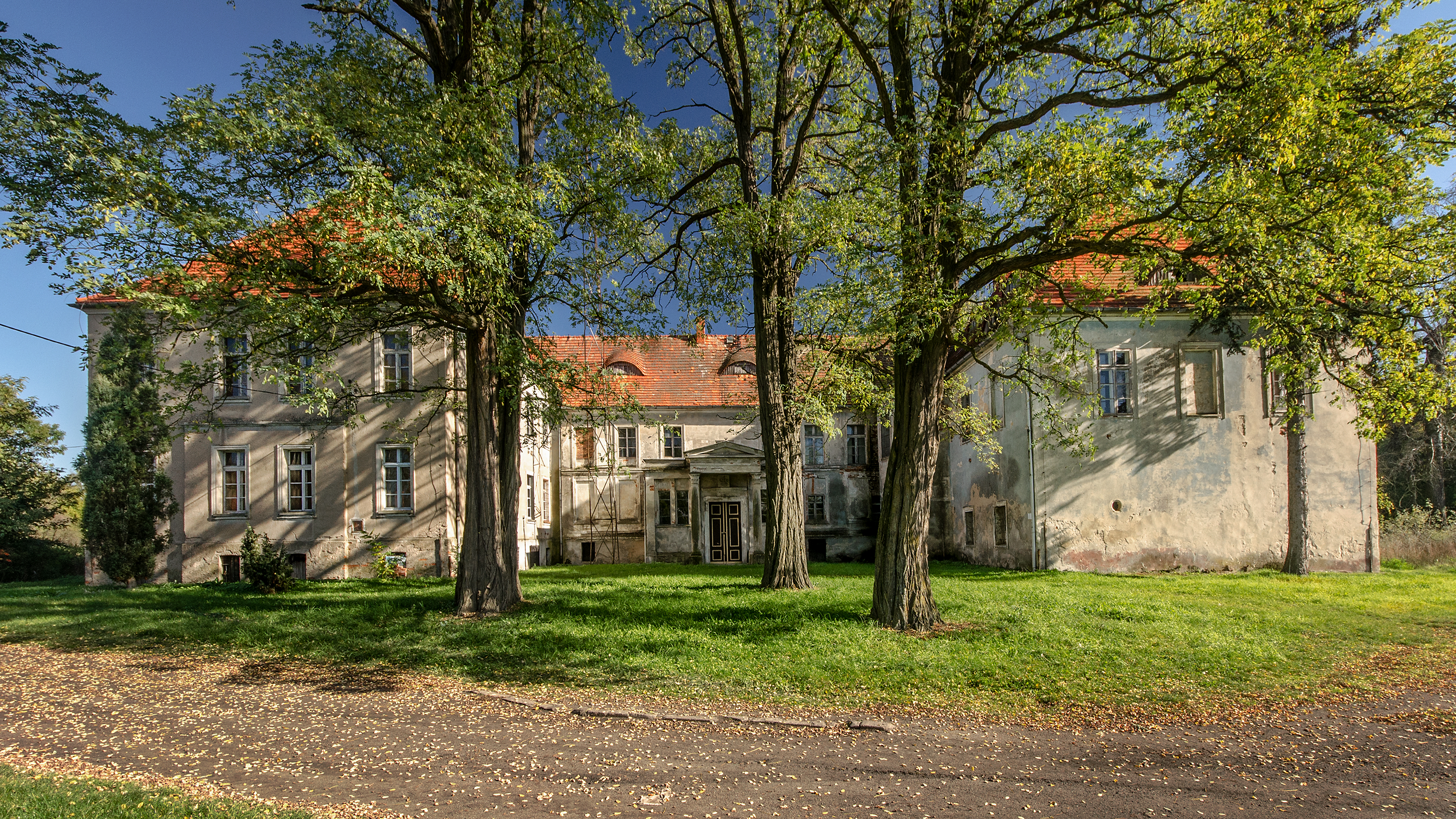
- Palace

- Location within Poland
- Coordinates: 51°24′N 16°22′E
- Country: Poland
- Voivodeship: Lower Silesian
- County: Lubin
- Gmina: Ścinawa
- Population: 290
- Website: http://www.reszow.pl

Ręszów [ˈrɛ̃ʂuf] is a village in the municipality of Gmina Ścinawa, within Lubin County, Lower Silesian Voivodeship, in south-western Poland. Between 1975 and 1998 Ręszów was under the administration of the Legnica Voivodeship. In 2006 Ręszów's population was documented at 290 inhabitants.

== History ==
The earliest documented reference to Ręszów, then known by its German name Ransen, dates back to 1209. The village church was first constructed in 1376 and underwent several renovations during the 19th century. Between 1541 and 1715, Ręszów was home to the von Nostitz royal family. The von Nostitz palace was modernized in 1912 as well as during the 1930s by Heinrich Oswald von Sprenger. Today the former palace serves as a local housing complex. Following the Potsdam Conference in 1945, Ręszów was incorporated into the Third Polish Republic. During communist rule, a State Agricultural Farm (PGR) was operated in Ręszów.

== German WWI Monument ==
The central part of Ręszów features a monument commemorating village residents who perished fighting in World War I. The monument underwent restoration in 2003.
