= Rajec Szlachecki =

- Village
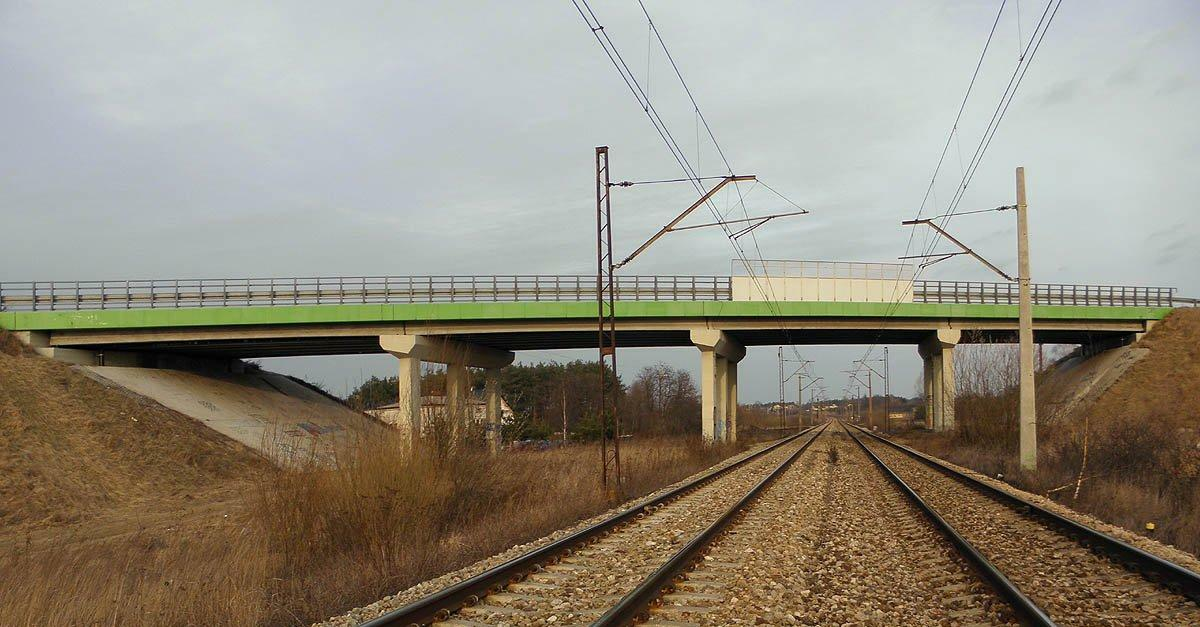
- Railway line in Rajec Szlachecki

- Location within Poland
- Coordinates: 51°24′51″N 21°13′54″E
- Country: Poland
- Voivodeship: Masovian
- County: Radom
- Gmina: Jedlnia-Letnisko

Rajec Szlachecki (Polish pronunciation: [ˈrajɛts ʂlaˈxɛtskʲi]) is a village in the administrative district of Gmina Jedlnia-Letnisko, within Radom County, Masovian Voivodeship, in east-central Poland.
