= Aleksandrów, Radom County =

Aleksandrów
- Village
- Location within Poland
- Coordinates: 51°25′16″N 21°20′25″E
- Country: Poland
- Voivodeship: Masovian
- County: Radom
- Gmina: Jedlnia-Letnisko

Aleksandrów [alɛkˈsandruf] is a village in the administrative district of Gmina Jedlnia-Letnisko, within Radom County, Masovian Voivodeship, in east-central Poland.
