= Jurcz =

- Village
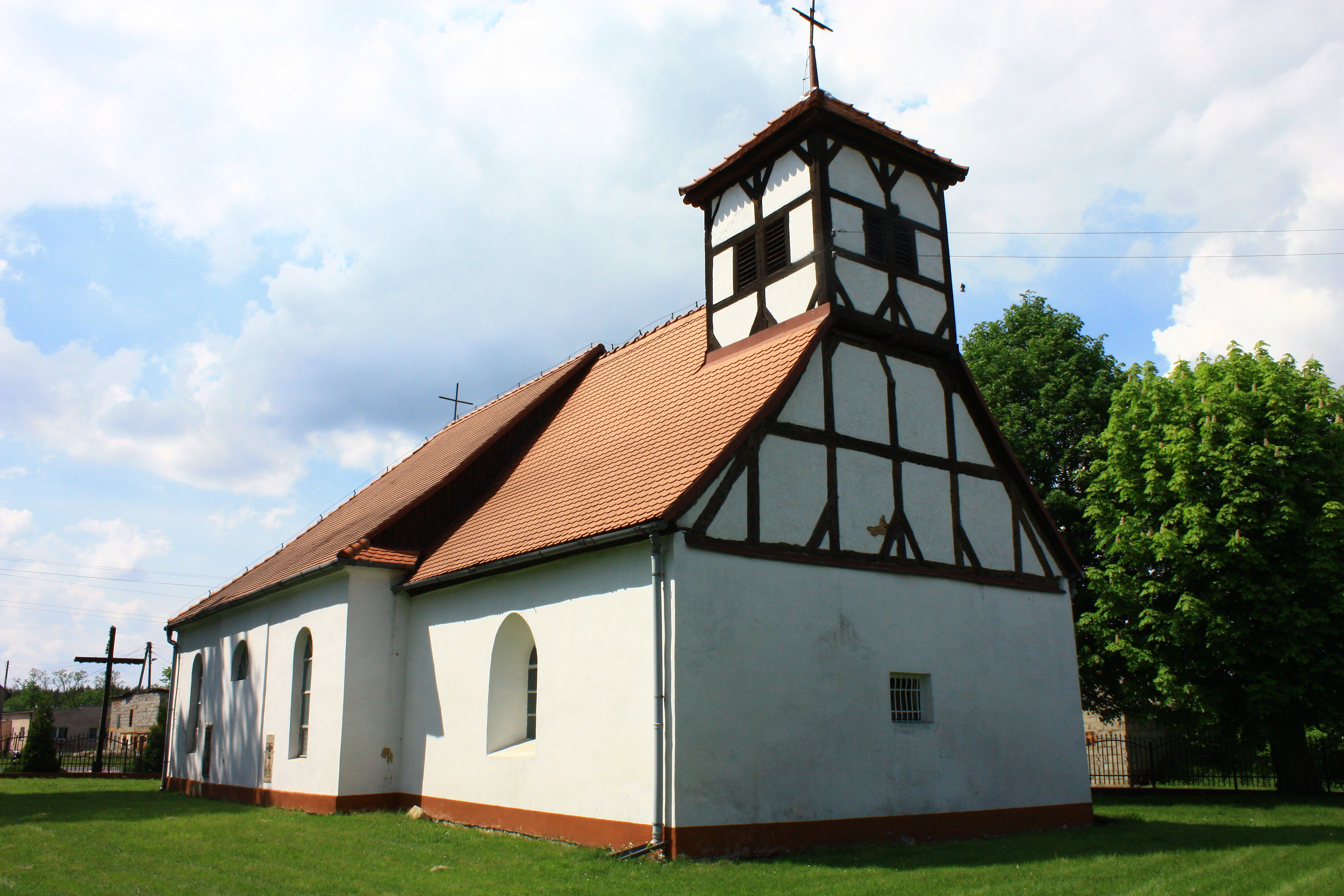
- Catholic church

- Location within Poland
- Coordinates: 51°19′09″N 16°24′29″E
- Country: Poland
- Voivodeship: Lower Silesian
- County: Lubin
- Gmina: Ścinawa

Jurcz [jurt͡ʂ] is a village in the administrative district of Gmina Ścinawa, within Lubin County, Lower Silesian Voivodeship, in south-western Poland.
