= Tymowa, Lower Silesian Voivodeship =

Tymowa
- Village
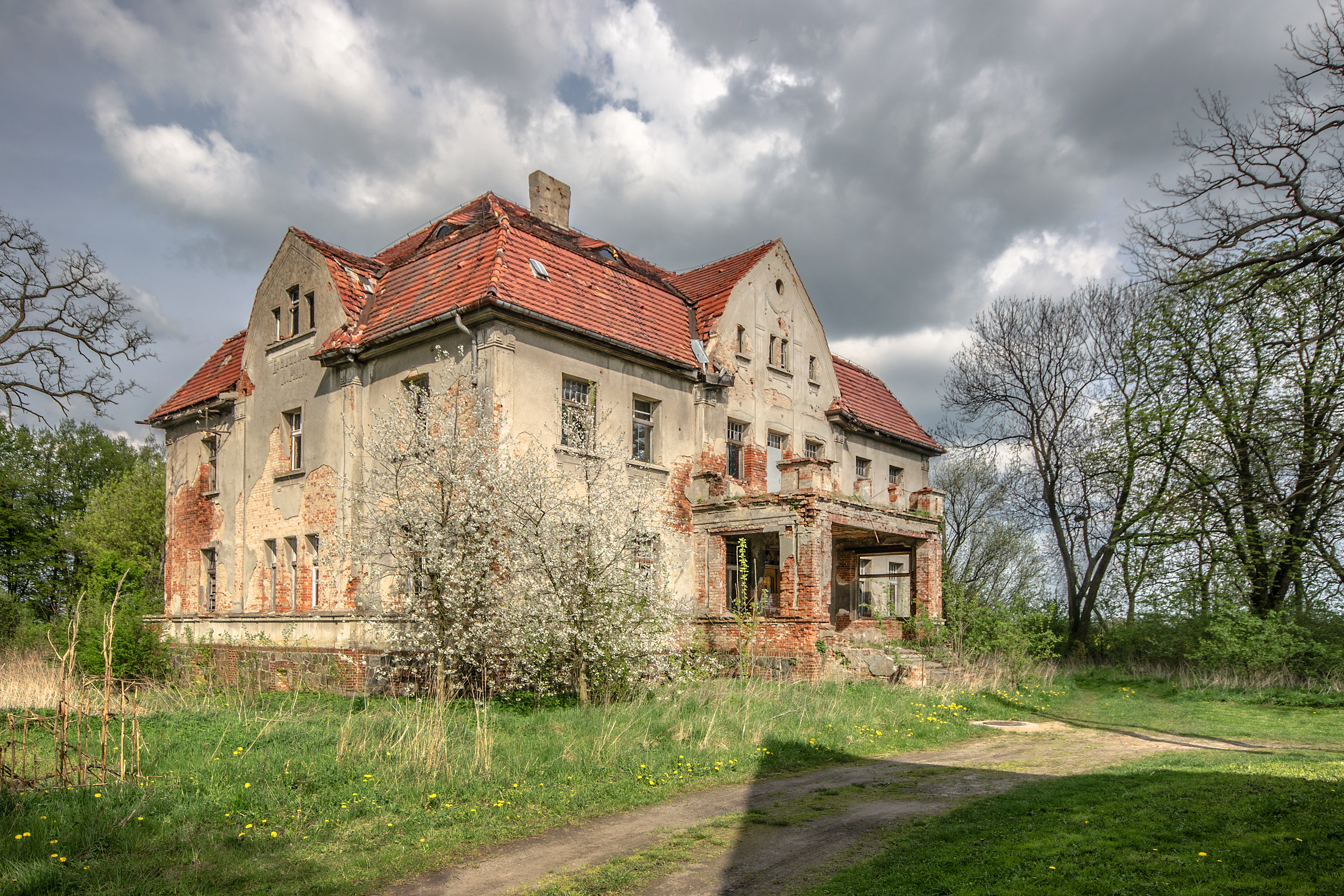
- Palace

- Location within Poland
- Coordinates: 51°27′09″N 16°20′51″E
- Country: Poland
- Voivodeship: Lower Silesian
- County: Lubin
- Gmina: Ścinawa
- Population: 860
- Website: http://www.tymowa.pl

Tymowa [tɨˈmɔva] is a village in the administrative district of Gmina Ścinawa, within Lubin County, Lower Silesian Voivodeship, in south-western Poland.
