= Lasowice, Masovian Voivodeship =

Lasowice
- Village
- Location within Poland
- Coordinates: 51°25′N 21°16′E
- Country: Poland
- Voivodeship: Masovian
- County: Radom
- Gmina: Jedlnia-Letnisko

Lasowice [lasɔˈvit͡sɛ] is a village in the administrative district of Gmina Jedlnia-Letnisko, within Radom County, Masovian Voivodeship, in east-central Poland.
