= Dziesław, Lower Silesian Voivodeship =

Dziesław
- Village
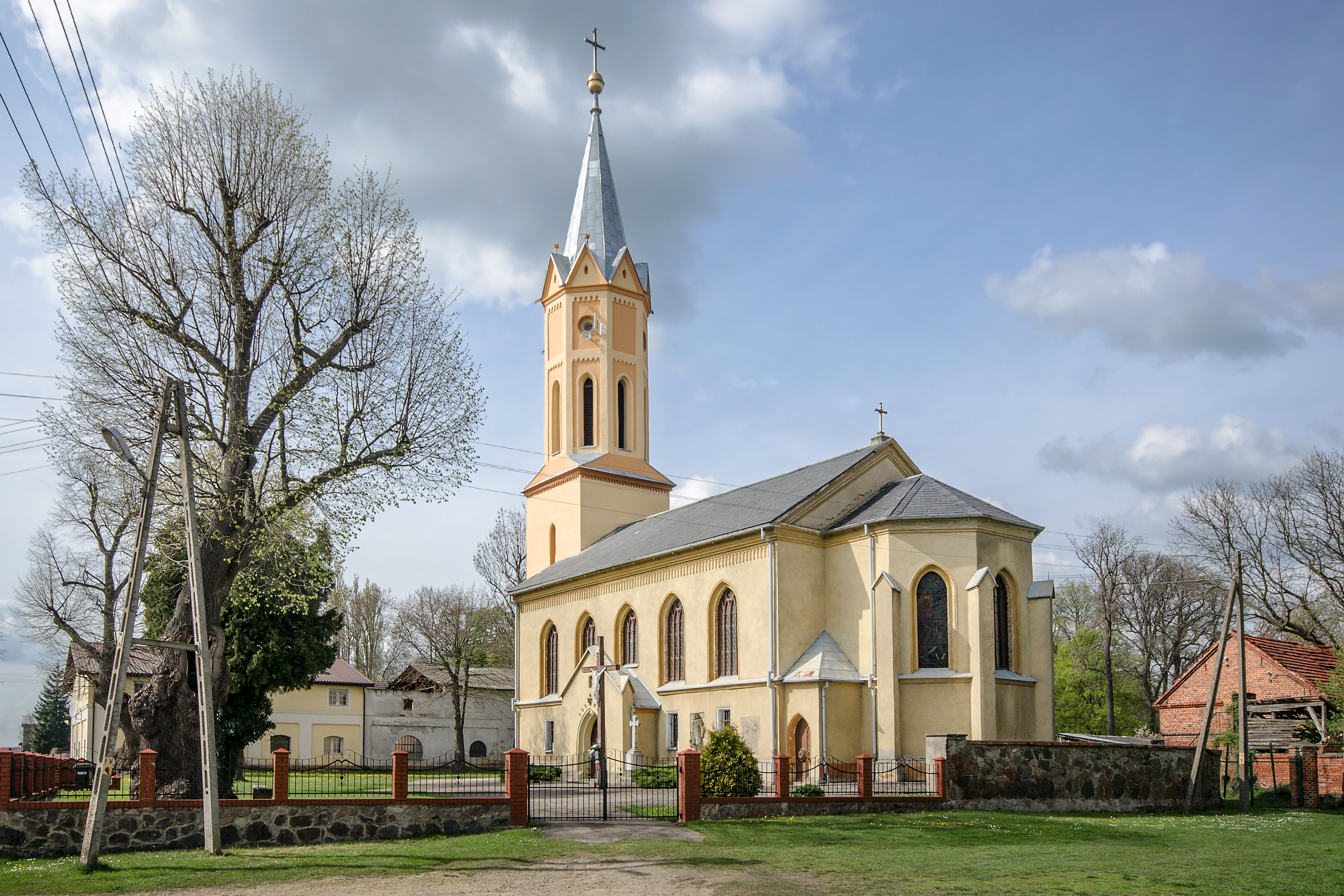
- Catholic church

- Location within Poland
- Coordinates: 51°28′20″N 16°22′13″E
- Country: Poland
- Voivodeship: Lower Silesian
- County: Lubin
- Gmina: Ścinawa

Dziesław [ˈd͡ʑɛswaf] is a village in the administrative district of Gmina Ścinawa, within Lubin County, Lower Silesian Voivodeship, in south-western Poland.
