= Krzyżowa, Lubin County =

Krzyżowa
- Village
- Location within Poland
- Coordinates: 51°23′46″N 16°25′27″E
- Country: Poland
- Voivodeship: Lower Silesian
- County: Lubin
- Gmina: Ścinawa
- Time zone: UTC+1 (CET)
  - Summer (DST): UTC+2 (CEST)
- Vehicle registration: DLU

Krzyżowa [kʂɨˈʐɔva] (German: Kreischau) is a village in the administrative district of Gmina Ścinawa, within Lubin County, Lower Silesian Voivodeship, in south-western Poland.

The Polish National road 36 runs nearby, north of Krzyżowa, and the Voivodeship road 292 passes east of the village.
