= Wrzosów, Masovian Voivodeship =

Polish village

Wrzosów
- Village
- Location within Poland
- Coordinates: 51°25′36″N 21°18′4″E
- Country: Poland
- Voivodeship: Masovian
- County: Radom
- Gmina: Jedlnia-Letnisko

Wrzosów [ˈvʐɔsuf] is a village in the administrative district of Gmina Jedlnia-Letnisko, within Radom County, Masovian Voivodeship, in east-central Poland.
