= Lasowice, Lubin County =

Lasowice
- Village
- Location within Poland
- Coordinates: 51°26′27″N 16°24′54″E
- Country: Poland
- Voivodeship: Lower Silesian
- County: Lubin
- Gmina: Ścinawa

Lasowice [lasɔˈvit͡sɛ] is a village in the administrative district of Gmina Ścinawa, within Lubin County, Lower Silesian Voivodeship, in south-western Poland.
