= Sadków-Górki =

Village in Gmina Jedlnia-Letnisko, Poland

- Village
- Location within Poland
- Coordinates: 51°23′48″N 21°13′6″E
- Country: Poland
- Voivodeship: Masovian
- County: Radom
- Gmina: Jedlnia-Letnisko
- Population: 421

Sadków-Górki [ˈsatkuf ˈɡurki] is a village in the administrative district of Gmina Jedlnia-Letnisko, within Radom County, Masovian Voivodeship, in east-central Poland.
