= Dziewin, Lower Silesian Voivodeship =

Dziewin
- Village
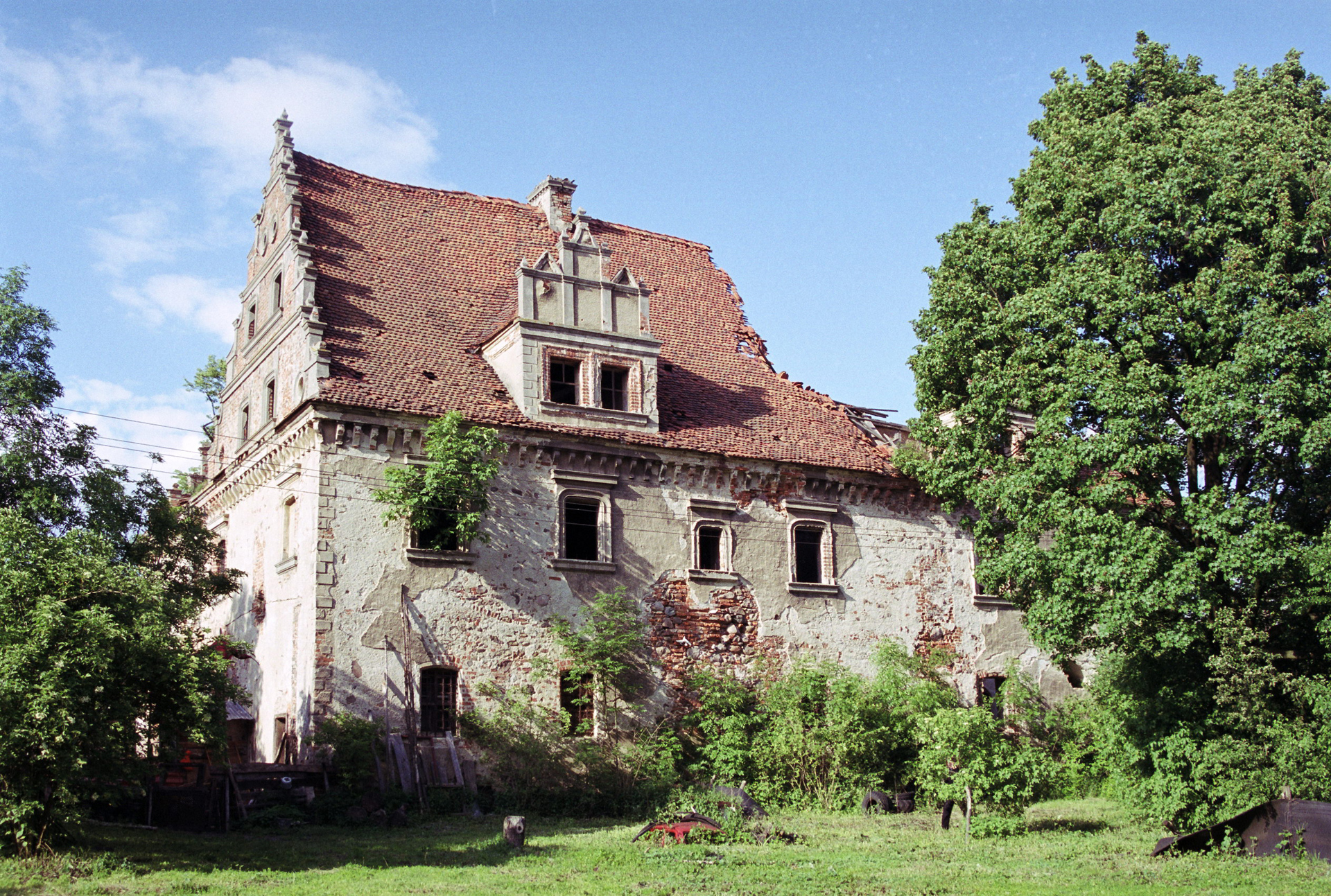
- Palace

- Location within Poland
- Coordinates: 51°22′08″N 16°27′37″E
- Country: Poland
- Voivodeship: Lower Silesian
- County: Lubin
- Gmina: Ścinawa

Dziewin [ˈd͡ʑɛvin] is a village in the administrative district of Gmina Ścinawa, within Lubin County, Lower Silesian Voivodeship, in southwestern Poland.
