= Gmina Ścinawa =

Urban-rural gmina in Lubin County

Gmina Ścinawa Ścinawa Commune
- Gmina
- Coat of arms
- Interactive map of Gmina Ścinawa
- Coordinates (Ścinawa): 51°24′40″N 16°25′23″E
- Country: Poland
- Voivodeship: Lower Silesian
- County: Lubin
- Seat: Ścinawa
- Sołectwos: Buszkowice, Chełmek Wołowski, Dąbrowa Środkowa, Dębiec, Dłużyce, Dziesław, Dziewin, Jurcz, Krzyżowa, Lasowice, Parszowice, Przychowa, Redlice, Ręszów, Sitno, Turów, Tymowa, Wielowieś, Zaborów

Area
  - Total: 164.56 km^{2} (63.54 sq mi)

Population (2019-06-30)
  - Total: 9,938
  - Density: 60.39/km^{2} (156.4/sq mi)
  - Urban: 5,582
  - Rural: 4,356
- Website: http://www.scinawa.com.pl

Gmina Ścinawa is an urban-rural gmina (administrative district) in Lubin County, Lower Silesian Voivodeship, in south-western Poland. Its seat is the town of Ścinawa, which lies approximately 16 kilometres (10 mi) east of Lubin, and 54 kilometres (34 mi) north-west of the regional capital Wrocław.

The gmina covers an area of 164.56 square kilometres (63.5 sq mi), and as of 2019 its total population was 9,938.

== Neighbouring gminas ==
Gmina Ścinawa is bordered by the gminas of Lubin, Prochowice, Rudna, Wińsko and Wołów.

== Villages ==
Apart from the town of Ścinawa, the gmina contains the villages of Buszkowice, Chełmek Wołowski, Dąbrowa Środkowa, Dębiec, Dłużyce, Dziesław, Dziewin, Grzybów, Jurcz, Krzyżowa, Lasowice, Parszowice, Przychowa, Przystań, Redlice, Ręszów, Sitno, Turów, Tymowa, Wielowieś and Zaborów.

== Twin towns – sister cities ==
Gmina Ścinawa is twinned with:

- Niemberg (Landsberg), Germany
