= Rajec Poduchowny =

- Village
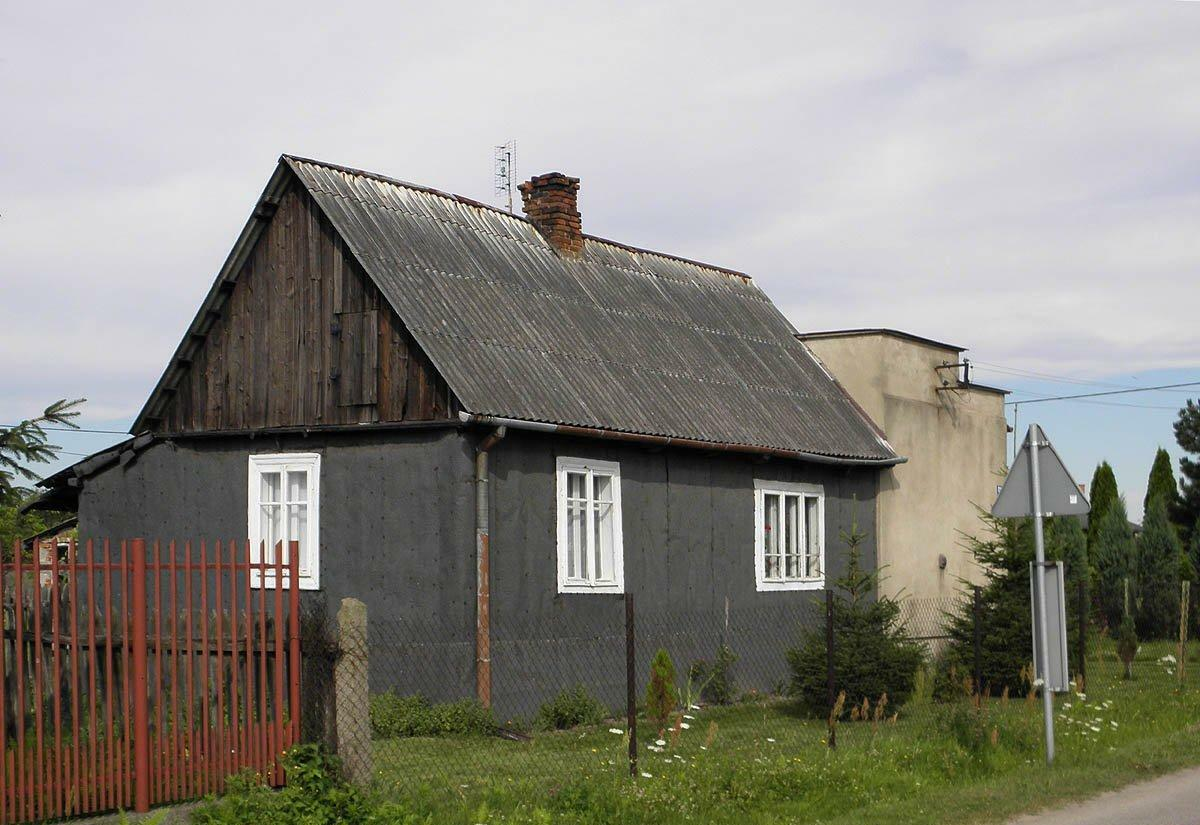
- Street of Rajec Poduchowny

- Location within Poland
- Coordinates: 51°25′32″N 21°14′35″E
- Country: Poland
- Voivodeship: Masovian
- County: Radom
- Gmina: Jedlnia-Letnisko

Rajec Poduchowny [ˈrajɛt͡s pɔduˈxɔvnɨ] is a village in the administrative district of Gmina Jedlnia-Letnisko, within Radom County, Masovian Voivodeship, in east-central Poland.
