= Kozienice Landscape Park =

Landscape park in east-central Poland

Coordinates: 51°27′43″N 21°35′09″E

- Kozienicki Park Krajobrazowy
- IUCN category V (protected landscape/seascape)
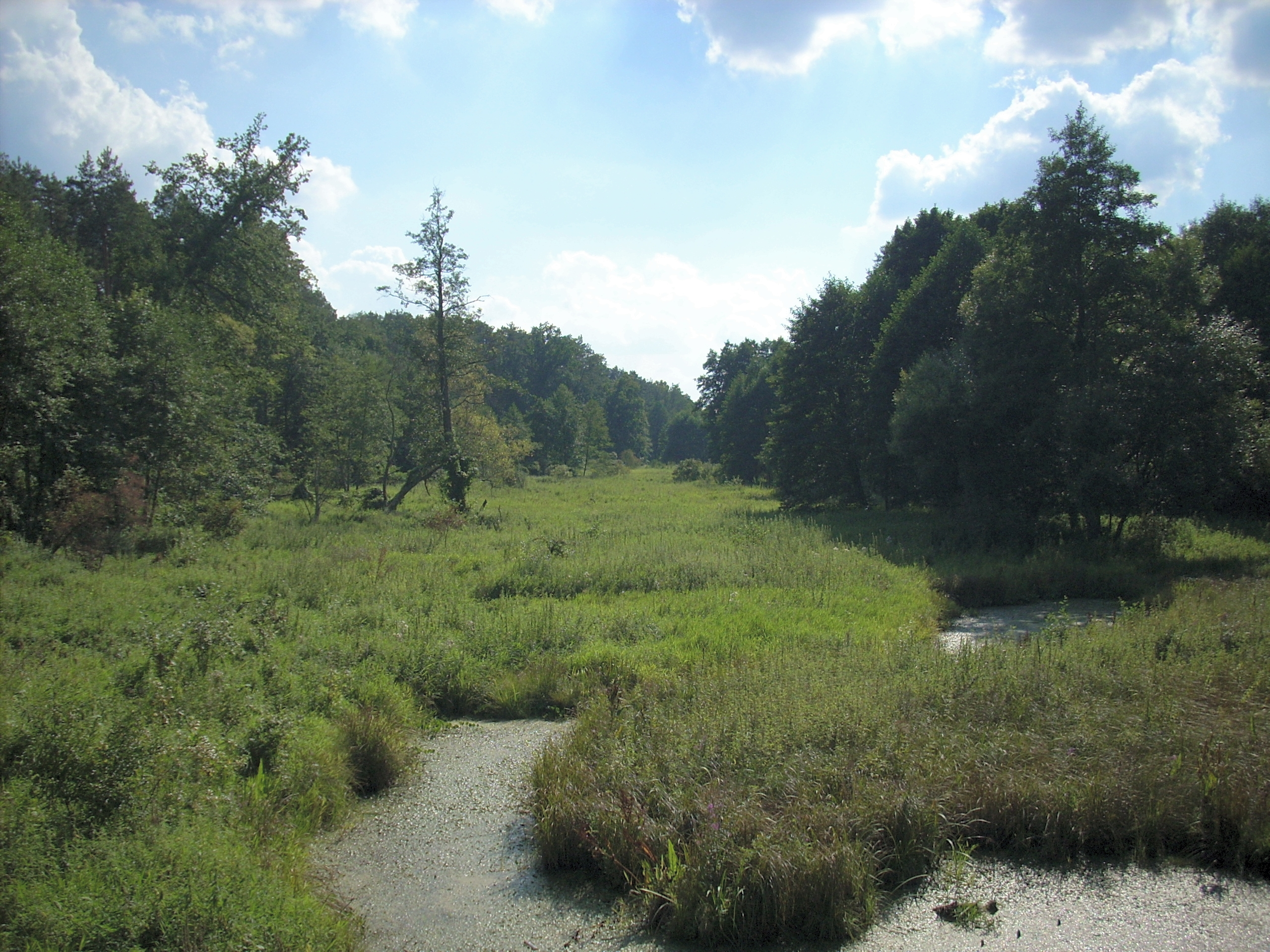
- Zagożdżonka river marshes at the Park
- Interactive map of Kozienice Landscape Park
- Location: Masovian Voivodeship
- Area: 262.33 km^{2} (101.29 sq mi)
- Established: 1983

Kozienice Landscape Park (Polish: Kozienicki Park Krajobrazowy) is a protected area (Landscape Park) in east-central Poland, established in 1983, covering an area of 262.33 square kilometres (101.29 sq mi).

The Park lies within Masovian Voivodeship. It takes its name from the town of Kozienice.

== Kozienice nature reserves ==
Within the Landscape Park are 15 nature reserves of importance for wildlife, flora, and fauna, including: Zagożdżon (65.67 ha), Ponty im. T. Zielińskiego (36.61 ha), Brzeźniczka (122.48 ha), Załamanek (78.97 ha), Pionki (81.60 ha), Ciszek (40.28 ha), Jedlnia (86.42 ha), Miodne (20.38 ha), Ługi Helenowskie (93.56 ha), Krępiec (278.96 ha), Ponty Dęby (50.40 ha), Leniwa (26.89 ha), Źródło Królewskie (29.67 ha), Okólny Ług (168.94 ha), and Guść (87.09 ha).
