= Zimnica (river) =

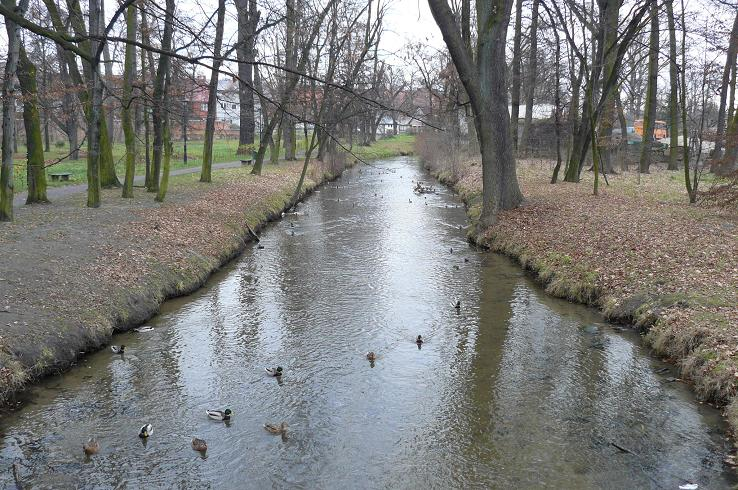

- Mouth of Zimnica

Location
- Country: Poland

Physical characteristics
- Mouth
  - location: Oder
  - coordinates: 51°25′42″N 16°26′13″E

Basin features
- Progression: Oder→ Baltic Sea

The Zimnica is a river in south-western Poland. It is a 20 km long left tributary of the river Oder. It begins near the city of Lubin, and joins the Oder near Ścinawa.

== Overview ==
The source of Zimnica is located at an altitude of 167 meters above sea level, at the north-eastern foot of the Wędrowiec hill. In the upper course, the Zimnica flows northeastward in the direction of the village of Obora. Afterwards it turns east towards Lubin, flowing close to the closed tailings pond "Gilów". In this section of the upper course, salts and metal compounds are leached alongside the infiltration of rainwater, which leads to the pollution of the river.

The river flows through a covered water canal in the center of Lubin, and exits the canal near the Castle Chapel on the Castle Hill. It then goes northward, passing Niemstów, Sitno and Dłużyce. After passing through Ścinawa, the river flows into the ecological use area "Ścinawskie Marsh". Through the mouth of the marsh it flows into the Oder at a height of 88 meters above sea level.

Zimnica river mainly flows eastward, passing through the Lubińska Upland and the Ścinawa Depression. The Zimnica Valley in most sections has the character of a well-developed, extensive flat-bottomed valley.
