= KGHM Polska Miedź =

Polish multinational mining corporation

KGHM Polska Miedź S.A.
- Company type: Spółka Akcyjna
- Traded as: WSE: KGH; WIG30 component
- ISIN: PLKGHM000017
- Industry: Metals, Mining, Metallurgy
- Founded: 1961; 65 years ago
- Headquarters: Lubin, Poland
- Area served: Worldwide
- Key people: Marcin Chludziński; President of the Management Board; Andrzej Kisielewicz; Chairman of the Supervisory Board
- Products: Copper, Copper sulphate, Gold, Silver, Nickel, Nickel sulphate, Molybdenum, Rhenium, Lead, Sulphuric acid, Selenium, Platinum
- Revenue: $8.72 billion (2025)
- Net income: $720.6 million (2025)
- Total assets: $13.05 billion (2025)
- Total equity: € 4.6 billion (2019)
- Number of employees: 33,935 (2017)
- Subsidiaries: KGHM International Ltd (100%); Sierra Gorda SCM (55%)
- Website: KGHM Corporate Website

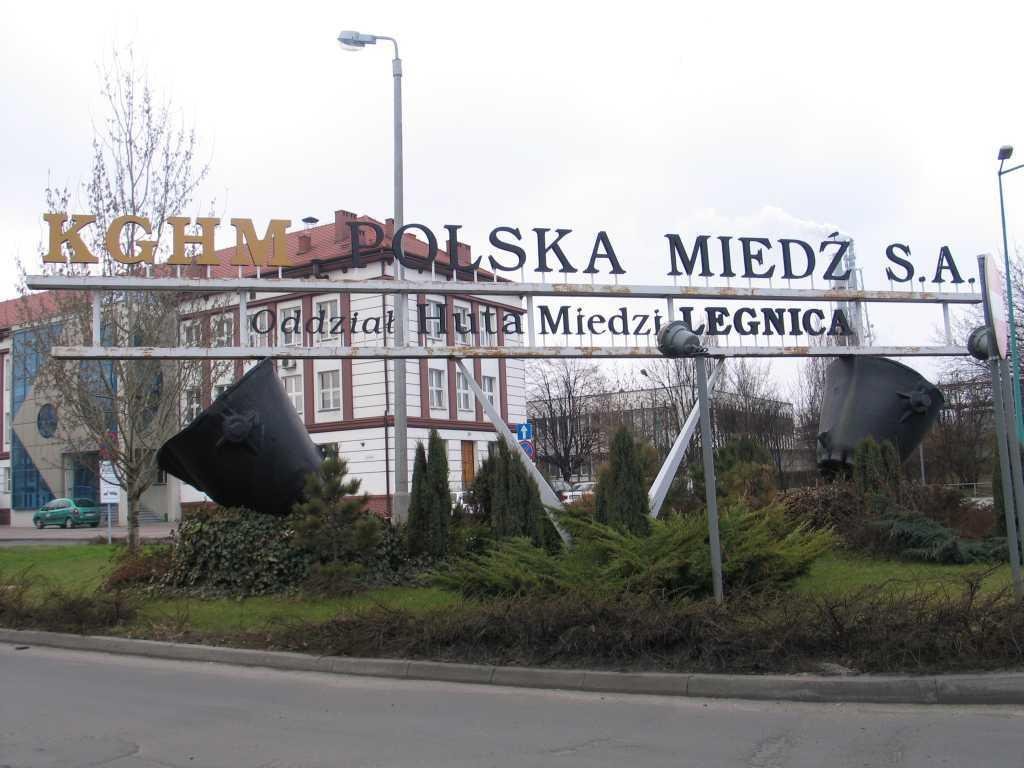
KGHM copper works in Legnica

KGHM Polska Miedź S.A. (Kombinat Górniczo-Hutniczy Miedzi), commonly known as KGHM (Polish pronunciation: [ˈkaɡjɛxaɛm]), is a Polish multinational mining corporation headquartered in Lubin, Lower Silesia, Poland. Founded in 1961 as a state enterprise, the company is considered a major global producer of copper and silver. Since 1997, it has been listed on the Warsaw Stock Exchange (WSE). The company is also a component of the WIG30 stock market index.

Currently, KGHM employs around 34,000 people worldwide and operates 9 open-pit and underground mines in Poland, Canada, the United States and Chile. KGHM produces key global resources including copper, copper sulphate, gold, silver, nickel, nickel sulphate, molybdenum, rhenium, lead, sulphuric acid, selenium, platinum group metals.

== History ==
=== Early history and foundation ===
In 1951, the construction of the Copper Smelter in Legnica was commenced to smelt copper from the ore mined in the so-called old Lower Silesian copper basin ("Lena" and "Konrad" mines).

In 1957, Jan Wyżykowski discovered copper ore deposits near Lubin and Polkowice ("Sieroszowice" field).

On 28 December 1959 by the decision of the Ministry of Heavy Industry, Zakłady Górnicze "Lubin" was established as a state owned company and in 1961, transformed into Kombinat Górniczo-Hutniczy Miedzi (KGHM), which was supposed to deal with the extraction and processing of copper extracted from the newly discovered fields. At the same time, KGHM incorporated two copper mines in the area of the piedmont of the Sudetes from the old copper-bearing basin (closed in 1973 - "Lena" and in 2000 - "Konrad").

=== Expansion ===
In the years 1962-1975, Tadeusz Zastawnik was the director of KGHM (in the years 1952-1957 he was a Member of Parliament, and in the mid-1950s the director of the Union of Mining and Metallurgy of Non-Ferrous Metals). In 1968, the construction of the "Lubin" and "Polkowice" mines and the modernization of the Legnica smelter ended. The construction of the Głogów smelter started, and at the end of the 1960s, geologists discovered new, even richer copper deposits in Rudna.

In January 1996, the "Polkowice-Sieroszowice" Division was established, which was established as the result of the merger "Polkowice" and "Sieroszowice" mines.

From the day the state enterprise was established, until 9 August 1976, the Minister of Heavy Industry, and then the Minister of Metallurgy (the office was transformed into the office of the Minister of Metallurgy and Machine Industry) supervised operations.

=== Transformation ===
On 9 September 1991, the state-owned enterprise Kombinat Górniczo-Hutniczy Miedzi in Lubin was transformed into a sole-shareholder company of the State Treasury - KGHM Polska Miedź SA. On 12 September 1991, the company was entered in the commercial register kept by the District Court in Legnica and on the same day, the court removed the former entity from the register of state-owned enterprises.

=== Integration ===
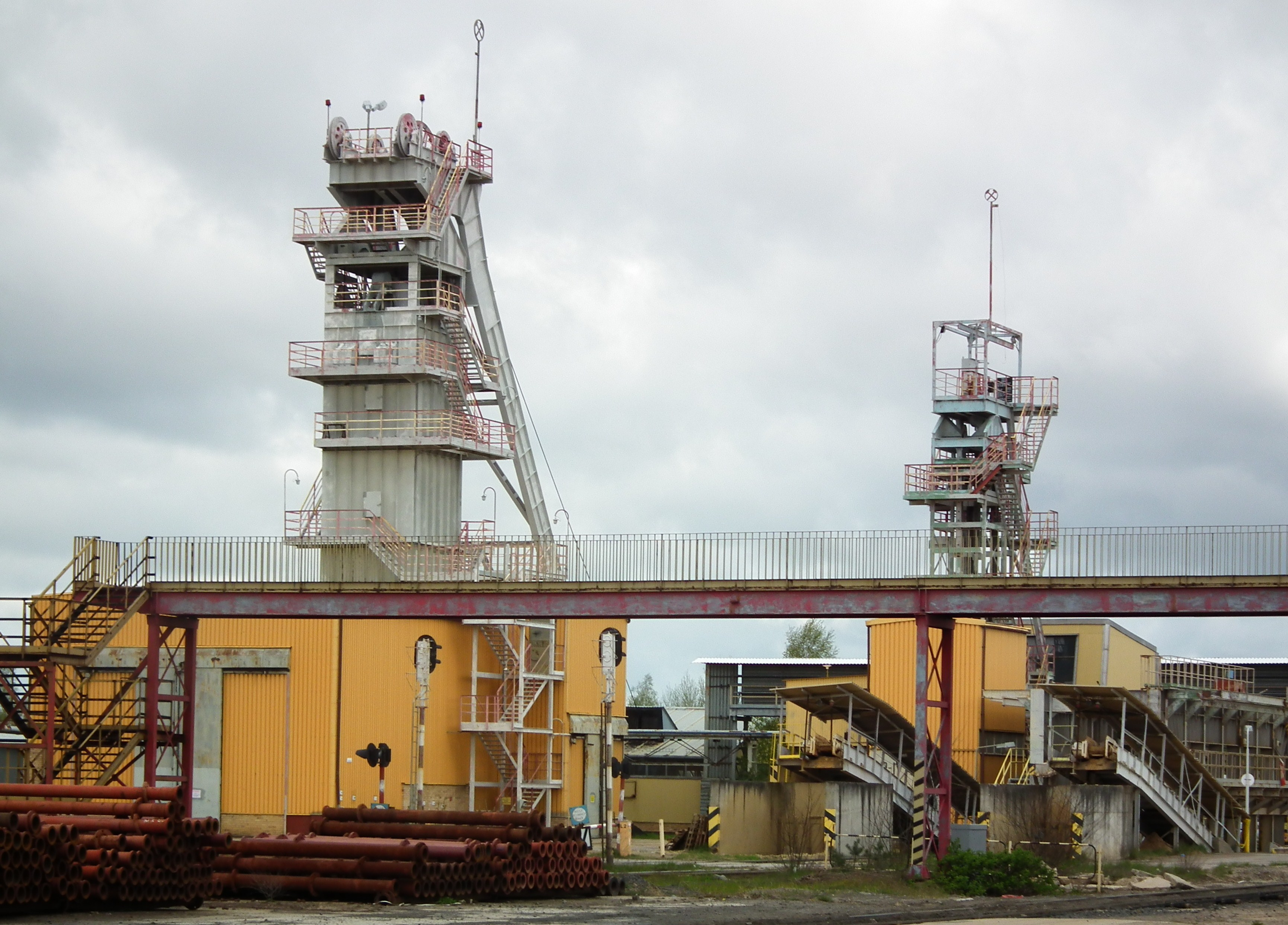
Rudna Copper Mine in Lower Silesia, Poland

On 6 December 2011, the management boards of KGHM Polska Miedź SA and Quadra FNX Mining Ltd. signed an agreement on the takeover of the Canadian enterprise by KGHM. On 20 February 2012, the general meeting of shareholders of Quadra FNX Mining Ltd. accepted the transaction of a friendly takeover of 100% of shares in the company Quadra FNX by KGHM Polska Miedź SA, and on 5 March 2012, the above transaction was closed.

Since then, Quadra FNX has been operating under the new name of KGHM International Ltd. The transaction value amounted to approximately $2.9 billion. The purchase was financed with funds of KGHM After the acquisition, the size of the combined resource base is 37.4 million tons of copper (fourth largest deposit in the world). The combined annual copper production was then 526 thousand tonnes. One of the key assets of KGHM International Ltd. is the Sierra Gorda field in Atacama Desert. The deposit is located in Chile and contains 1.3 billion tons of ore rich in copper, gold and molybdenum.

=== Recent developments ===
In May 2015, a new production line was launched at the Nitroerg plant in Bieruń.

In 2022, the company announced plans to invest in the renewable energy sector, especially in offshore wind farms, and potential acquisitions of finished photovoltaic farms projects. The company is also preparing a series of investments connected to buying, processing and preparing copper-bearing scrap. Asked about the potential impact of the 2022 Russian invasion of Ukraine on the company, KGHM's President of the Management Board Marcin Chludzinski responded that it "would not have a significant impact on the company's operations" and that potential sanctions on Russian copper would be positive for the company.

In May 2022, KGHM was represented in the Polish delegation headed by Polish President Andrzej Duda and Prime Minister Mateusz Morawiecki at the 2022 Davos World Economic Forum as part of the promotion of the Polish economy. The same year, the company also signed an agreement with US-based company NuScale Power to implement small modular nuclear reactor (SMR) technology in Poland. The first power plant is to be in operation by 2029.

In 2023, the company announced a multi-million investment project in the Legnica Copper Smelter and Refinery in an effort to protect the environment. The project aims to nearly completely eliminate arsenic and mercury emissions thanks to a new Post-Process Gas Treatment Plant.

=== Controversy ===
There has been controversy where the company had dumped toxic waste into the Oder River illegally, causing a massive ecological disaster. The dumping of industrial wastewater which had a higher than normal salt content allowed the proliferation of Prymnesium parvum, a species of algae responsible for the 2022 Oder environmental disaster.

== Corporate affairs ==
=== Structure ===
KGHM Polska Miedź currently has two subsidiaries:

- KGHM International Ltd. is a wholly owned subsidiary
- Sierra Gorda SCM is a 55% subsidiary

=== Leadership ===
KGHM is led by a five-member management board, which is led by President of the Management Board Remigiusz Paszkiewicz. The other members are Piotr Krzyżewski, Mirosław Laskowski, Zbigniew Bryja and Anna Sobieraj-Kozakiewicz. The supervisory board is led by chairman Zbigniew Ćwiąkalski and vice chairman Artur Ulrich.

=== Shareholder ===
Since July 1997, KGHM has been listed on the Warsaw Stock Exchange.

As of February 2019 the company's shareholder structure is:

- 31.79% - Polish State Treasury
- 5.05% - Nationale-Nederlanden OFE
- 5.02% - Aviva OFE
- 58.13% - Other shareholders

== Operations ==
KGHM has operations in the main areas mining and enrichment, metallurgy (smelting and refining) and project development and is currently active in four countries: Poland, Canada, Chile and the USA. In 2017, the company produced a total of 656 thousand tons of copper, 1,234 thousand tons of silver, 117 thousand troy ounces of gold, and 10 thousand tons of molybdenum.

=== Mining and enrichment ===
==== Robinson Mine ====
The Robinson Mine is located in Nevada. It is an open pit mine that produces copper with byproduct gold and molybdenum. It was KGHM International's most profitable mine, pulling in a net revenue of $532.9 million in 2012.

==== Carlota Mine ====
The Carlota Mine is located in Arizona. Like the Robinson mine, it is an open pit mine and produces copper. It is scheduled to close in 2013, despite operating through multiple court challenges. Its net revenue for 2012 was $84.1 million.

==== Sierra Gorda ====
Sierra Gorda mine in Chile is a copper-molybdenum open pit mine which started production on 1 October 2014 and was originally a jointly operated by KGHM International Ltd (55%) and South32 (45%). Before the South32's takeover in 2021 the shares not owned by KGHM Polska Miedź were held by Sumitomo Metal Mining Co. (31.5%) and Sumitomo Corporation (13.5%).

==== Franke mine ====
The Franke mine is located in northern Chile. It is also an open pit mine and produces copper. Its net revenue for 2012 was $152.5 million. KGHM International is blending Franke pit with a partnered China mine, with less mining being focused on Franke. In 2022 the mine was sold to Grupo Minero Las Cenizas.

=== Smelting and refining ===
KGHM owns three copper smelters: "Głogów", "Legnica", and "Cedynia". KGHM's smelters also produce lead, refined lead, sulphuric acid, nickel sulphate, and platinum-palladium concentrate.

=== Projects under development ===
- Deep Głogów
- Victoria
- Ajax Mine Project, British Columbia, Canada (since 2010), rejected on environmental grounds by the Canadian Government in 2018
- Sierra Gorda mine

== Awards and recognitions ==
In 2011, the company was awarded with the Fray International Sustainability Award in Mexico, for its achievements and investments towards sustainable development.
