= Lubin =

City in Lower Silesia, Poland

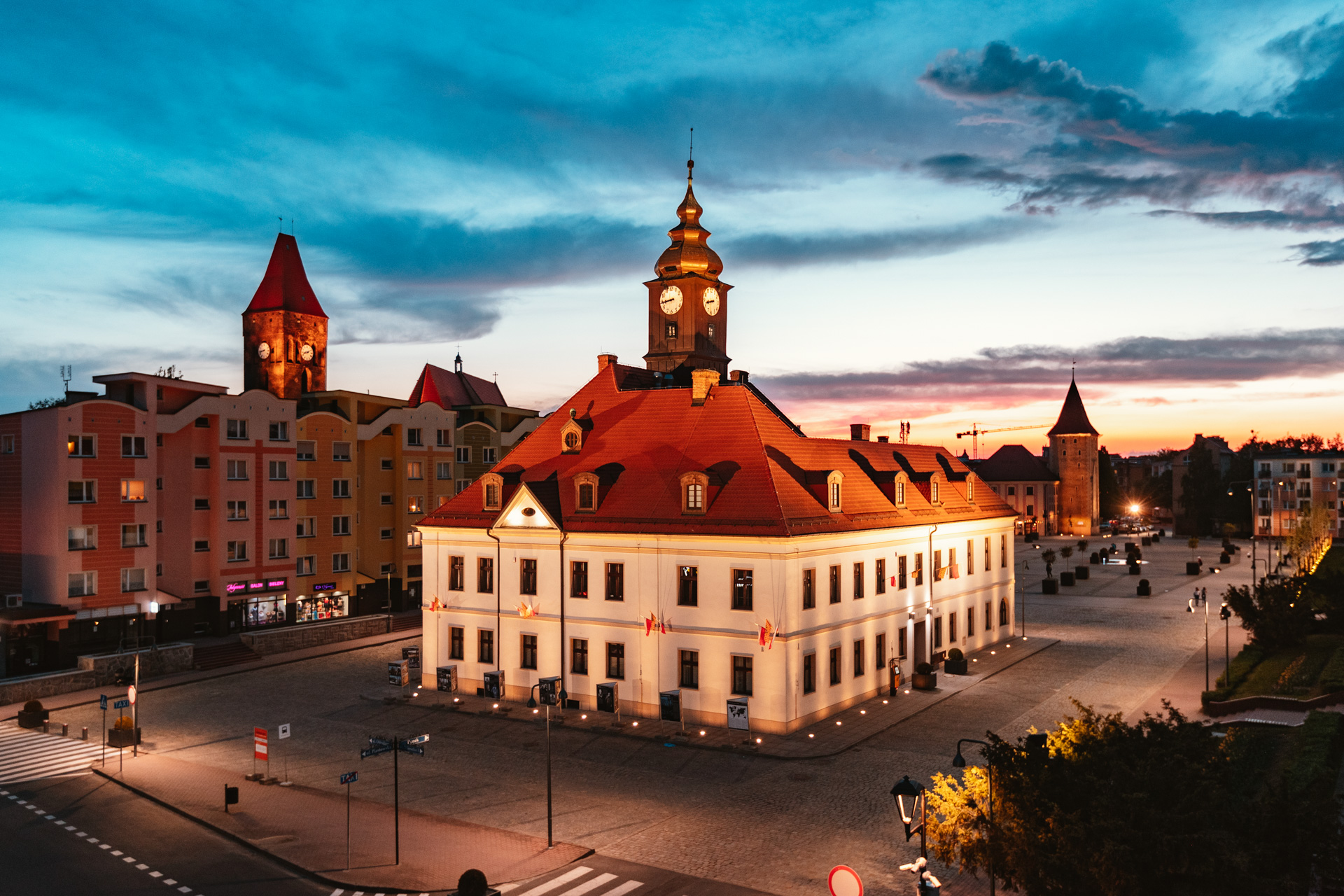
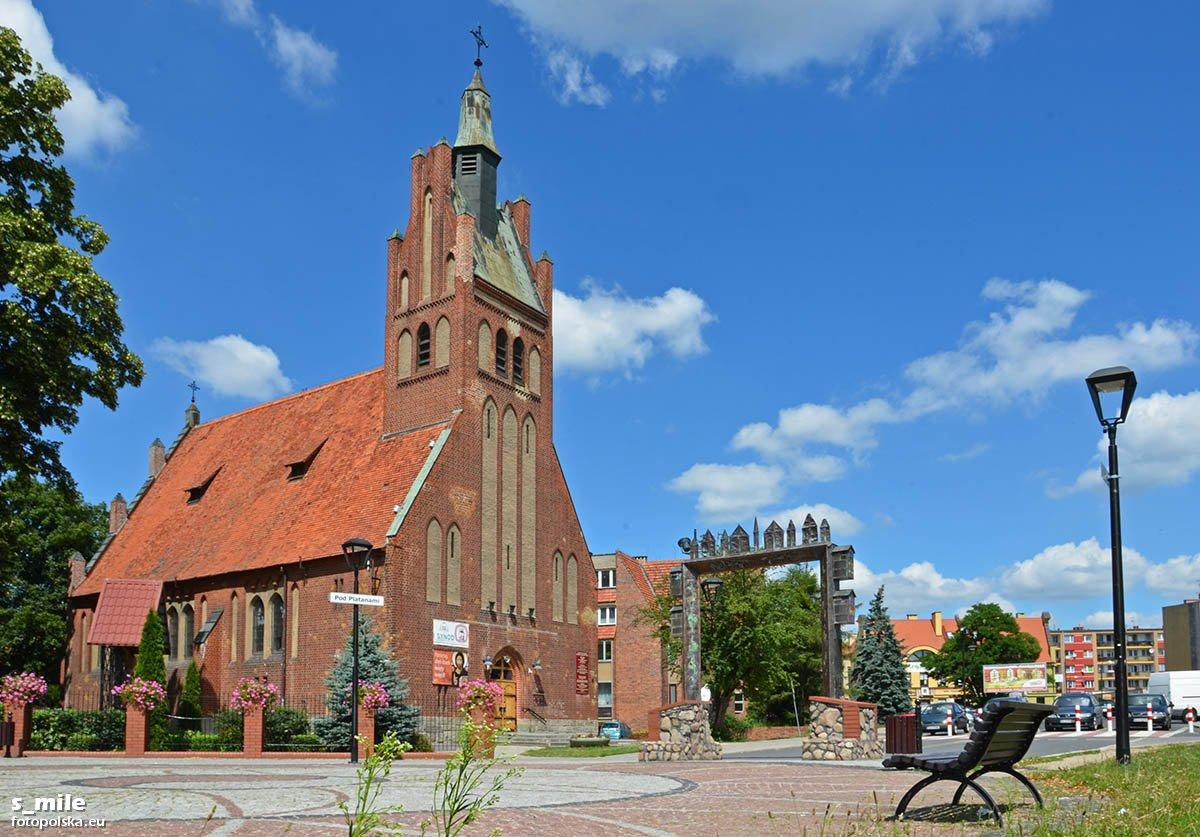
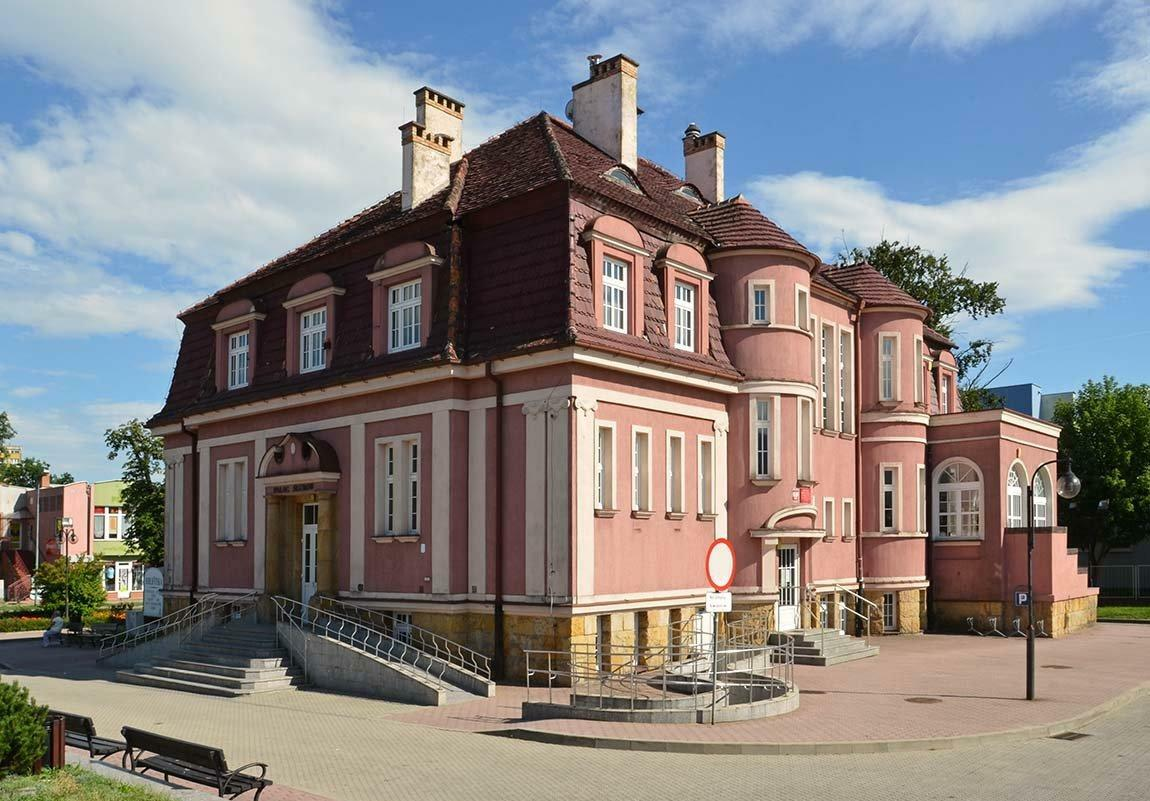
- City Hall Sacred Heart church Wedding Palace

- Flag Coat of arms

- Location within Poland
- Coordinates: 51°23′50″N 16°12′20″E
- Country: Poland
- Voivodeship: Lower Silesian
- County: Lubin
- Gmina: Lubin (urban gmina)
- Established: 12th century
- City rights: 1295

Government
  - City mayor: Robert Raczyński (BS)

Area
  - Total: 40.77 km^{2} (15.74 sq mi)

Population (2025)
  - Total: 65,961
- Time zone: UTC+1 (CET)
  - Summer (DST): UTC+2 (CEST)
- Postal code: 59-300
- Area code: +48 76
- Car plates: DLU
- Website: http://www.lubin.pl

Lubin (Polish: [ˈlubin]; German: Lüben) is a city in Lower Silesian Voivodeship in south-western Poland. It is the administrative seat of Lubin County, and also of the rural district called Gmina Lubin, although it is not part of the territory of the latter, as the town forms a separate urban gmina. As of 2021, the city had a total population of 70,815.

Lubin was a small town with medieval origins, being a castellan seat in the 12th century. Over the centuries it prospered as a center of cloth and linen making. It owed its recent great growth to the discovery of the largest copper ore deposits in Europe in 1957. The city is one of the major industrial locations in Lower Silesia, with the headquarters of the third-largest Polish corporation, the KGHM Polska Miedź mining company, one of the world's leading copper and silver producers. It is one of four cities in the Copper Belt (along with Legnica, Głogów and Polkowice). It is located on the main highway connecting the port city of Szczecin with the Czech–Polish border, part of the European route E65. Lubin has free public transport.

The city contains Gothic and Baroque landmarks, and is home to accomplished men's football and women's handball teams.

== Geography ==
Lubin is situated on the Zimnica river in the Lower Silesian historical region.

== Etymology ==
The name is of Polish origin, and comes from the word lubić, which means "to like".

== History ==
=== Piast dynasty rule ===
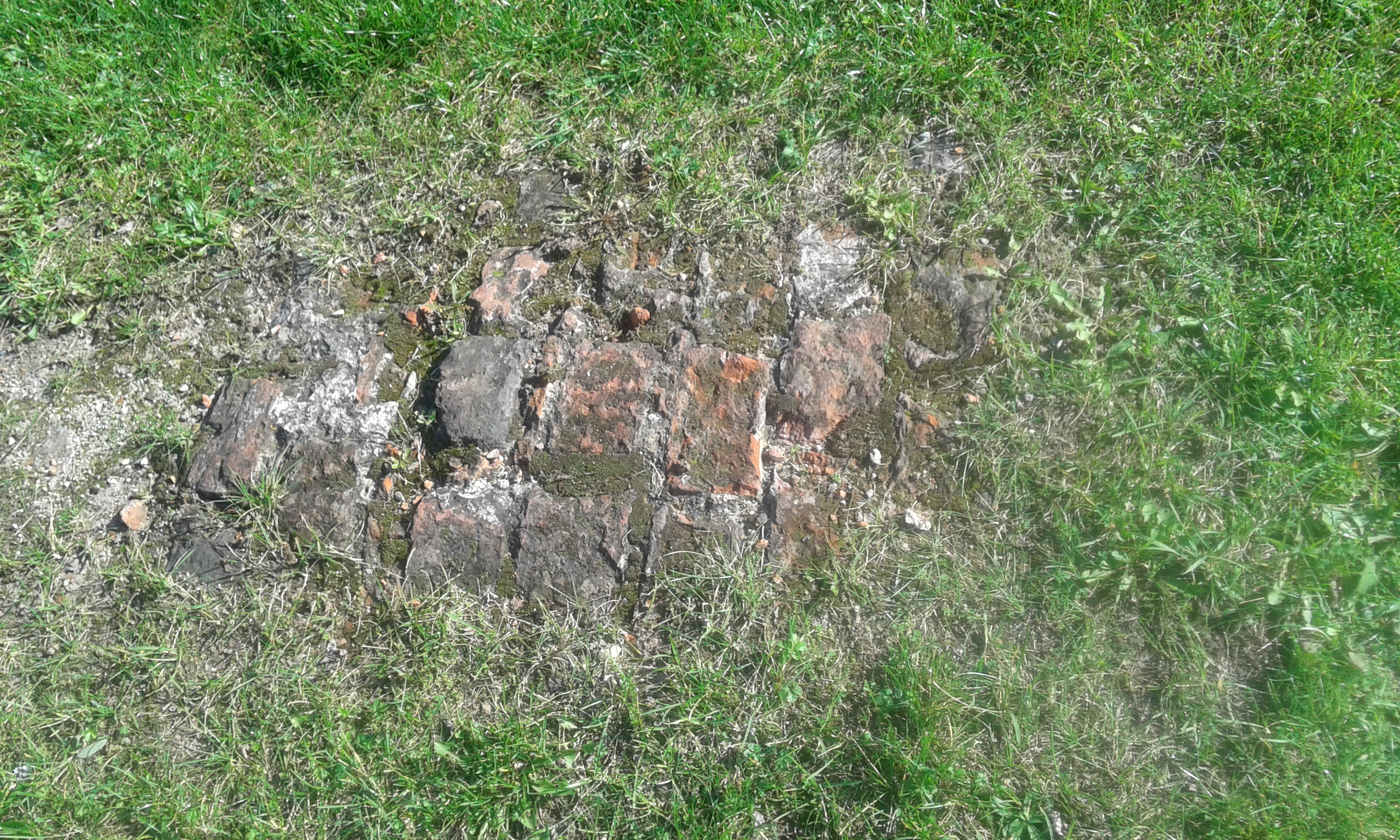
Ruins of the Piast Castle

The area of Lubin lies midway between the main settlements of two West Slavic Ślężanie tribes, the Dziadoszanie and the Trzebowianie, whose lands were both subdued by Mieszko I of Poland about 990. It is unclear which of the two tribes, if either, founded the town. One legend states that the town derives its name from Luba, a young man credited with slaying a giant bear that had been terrifying the inhabitants. A papal bull dated to circa 1155 mentions Lubin as one of 13 Silesian castellanies.

According to legend the Polish voivode Piotr Włostowic of Dunin (1080–1153) had a fieldstone church built on the hill in the west of Lubin, where about 1230 a castellany and a village arose that until today is called the Old City (Polish: Stary Lubin). The settlement in the Duchy of Głogów was first mentioned under the Old Polish name of Lubin in a 1267 deed by Pope Clement IV as a fiefdom of Trzebnica Abbey.

The New City of what is today Lubin was probably founded in the 1280s under the rule of Duke Przemko of Ścinawa by German settlers, maybe descending from Lower Lorraine or Franconia, in the course of the Ostsiedlung. It obtained its city rights about 1295. In 1329 Duke John of Ścinawa paid homage to King John of Bohemia, who upon the death of John's brother Duke Przemko II of Głogów in 1331 invaded the lands, which were incorporated into the Kingdom of Bohemia and shared the political fortunes of the Silesian crown land.

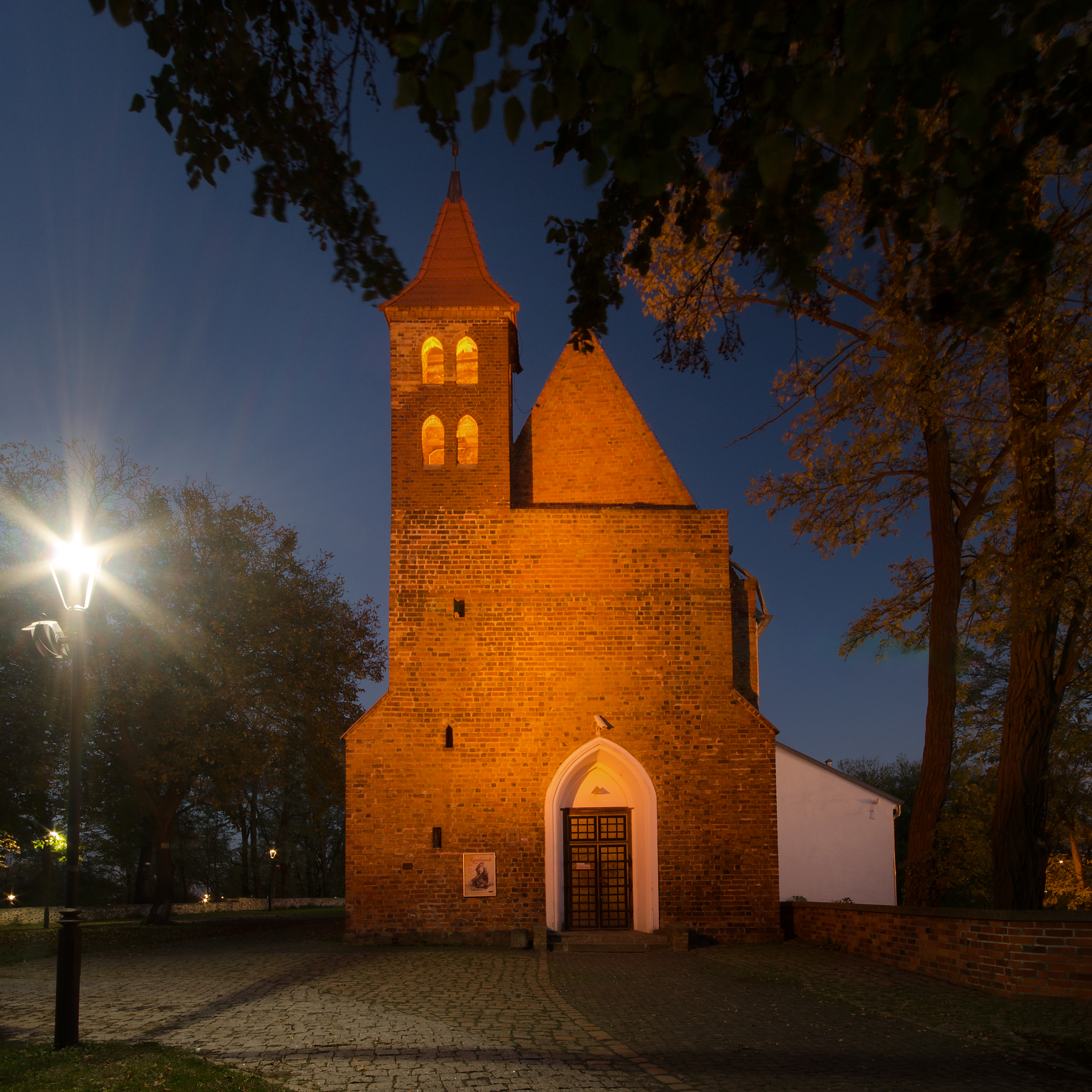
Gothic Castle Chapel

From 1348 Lubin Castle served as the residence of the Piast duke Louis I the Fair and his descendants. In the quarrel with his elder brother Duke Wenceslaus I of Legnica a 1359 judgement by Emperor Charles IV allotted Lubin along with Krzeczyn Wielki, Krzeczyn Mały, Osiek and Pieszków to Louis. About 1353 he had a manuscript on the life of Saint Hedwig of Andechs drawn up, later called Schlackenwerth (Ostrov) Codex, which today is kept at the J. Paul Getty Museum. The Castle Chapel in Lubin dates to the 14th century.

In the late 15th century the Lubin parish church was rebuilt in its present-day Gothic style, its high altar was moved to Wrocław Cathedral in 1951. Under the rule of Duke George I of Brzeg (died 1521) and his widow Anna of Pomerania, the reformer Caspar Schwenckfeld, born in nearby Osiek, made the town a centre of the Protestant Reformation in Lower Silesia. With Lower Silesia, Lubin in 1526 fell under suzerainty of the Habsburg monarchy. It was devastated several times during the Thirty Years' War. Lubin remained part of the Piast-ruled Duchy of Legnica until 1675, when it was incorporated to the Habsburg-ruled Bohemia.

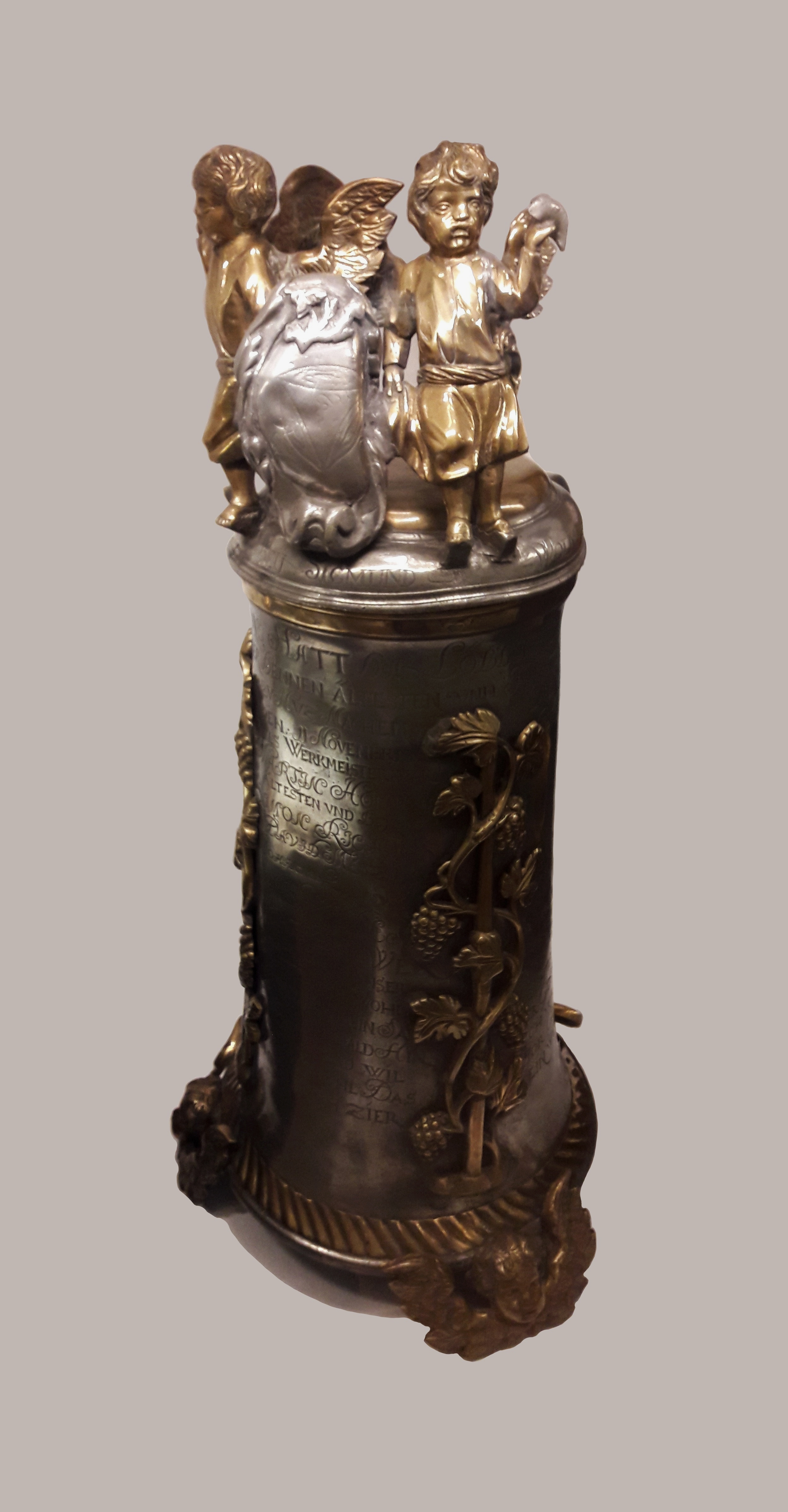
Flagon of the Weavers Guild in Lubin, kept in the National Museum in Warsaw

=== Late modern period and World War II ===
Conquered in the Silesian Wars by King Frederick II of Prussia in the mid-18th century, the town became a part of Prussia and later, in 1871, Germany. In 1871, after creation of the German Empire, it was connected by rail to Legnica (Liegnitz) and Głogów (Glogau). In reports on their parishes at the end of the 18th century, local pastors wrote about native Poles, who spoke a local dialect of the Polish language. The native Polish population was subjected to planned Germanisation, which lasted until the 1930s. A labour camp of the Reich Labour Service was operated in the town under Nazi Germany.

During World War II about 70% of the town's buildings were destroyed. In 1945 between the days of 8–10 February Red Army soldiers mass-murdered 150 German pensioners in an old-people's home and 500 psychiatric hospital patients in Lubin. The city eventually became again part of Poland, although with a Soviet-installed communist regime, which stayed in power until the 1980s. The remaining German population of the city was either expelled in accordance with the Potsdam Agreement, or prohibited from returning home by the communist authorities.

In the following years, the Polish anti-communist resistance was active in Lubin, including the nationwide Freedom and Independence Association and local Sokół Group.

=== Discovery of copper deposits ===
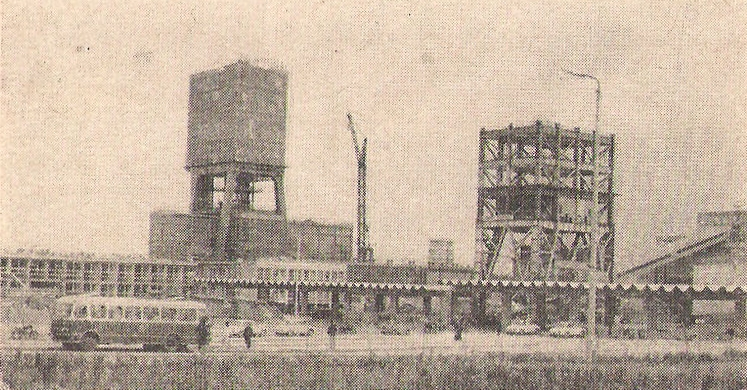
Construction of mining facilities in 1965

In 1957 Jan Wyżykowski discovered and in 1959 documented in Lubin the largest copper ore deposits in Europe and one of the largest in the world. Soon copper mines were built and the KGHM company was established.

From 1975 to 1998 it belonged to the former Legnica Voivodeship. In 1982 the city saw significant demonstrations against the martial law declared by the Communist regime, which were put down by its death squads, resulting in the murder of three people.

== Education ==
- Uczelnia Zawodowa Zagłębia Miedziowego
- I Liceum Ogólnokształcące im. Mikołaja Kopernika w Lubinie
- II Liceum Ogólnokształcące w Lubinie
- Technikum nr 1 im. Bolesława Krupińskiego w Lubinie

== Sports ==
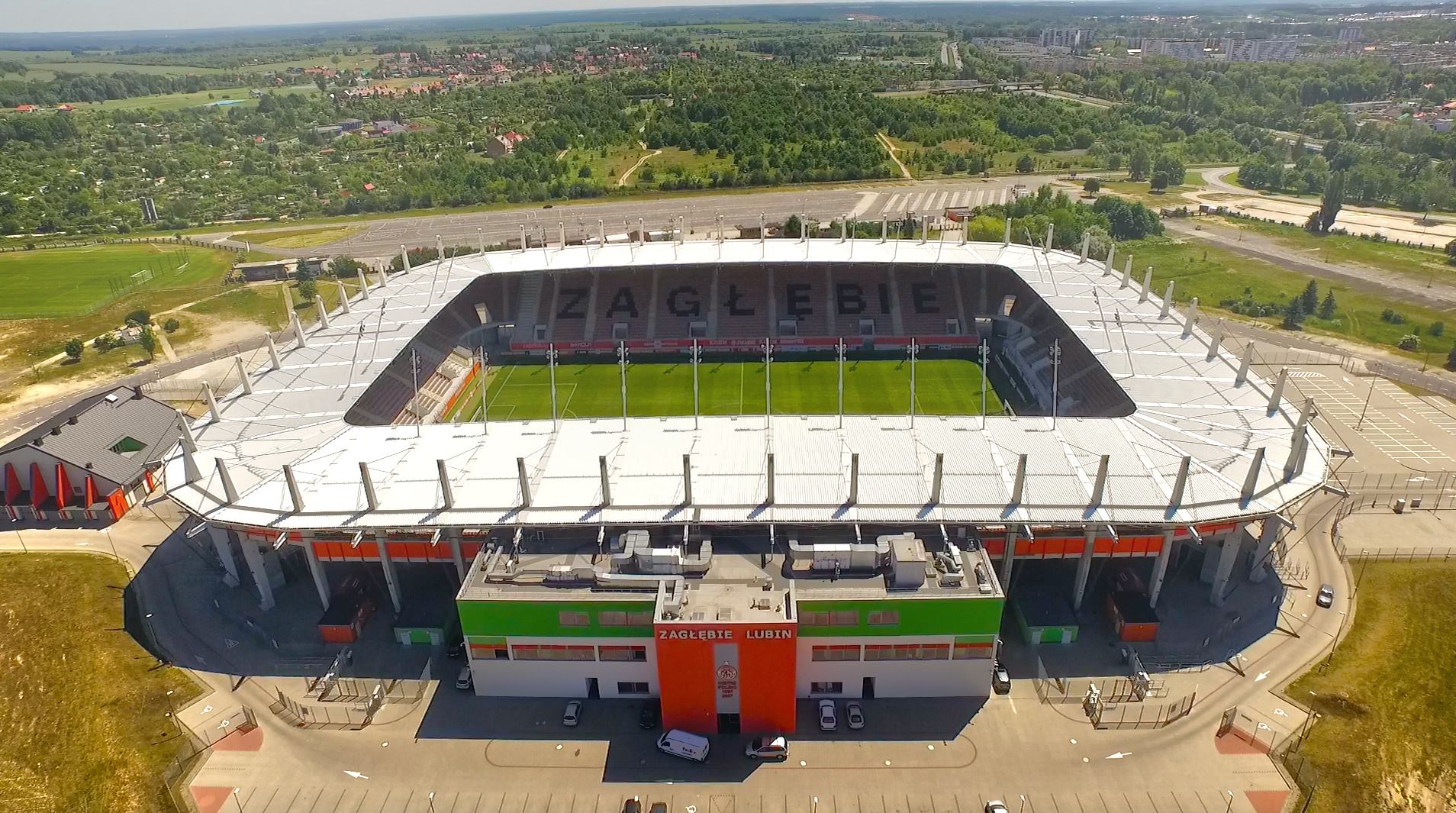
Stadium of Zagłębie Lubin

- Zagłębie Lubin – men's football team playing in the Ekstraklasa (top division) as of season 2024–25, Polish Champions in seasons 1990–91 and 2006–07.
- Zagłębie Lubin – men's handball team playing in the Polish Superliga (top division) as of season 2024–25, Polish Champions in season 2006–07.
- Zagłębie Lubin – women's handball team playing in the Women's Superliga (top division) as of season 2024–25, Polish Champions in seasons 2010–11, 2020–21 and 2021–22.

== Transport ==
Major roads running through Lubin:

- Expressway S3 (highway), part of the European route E65 – Lubawka-Legnica-Lubin-Zielona Góra-Gorzów Wielkopolski-Szczecin-Świnoujście
- National road 36 – Rawicz-Lubin-Prochowice

Lubin has a general aviation airport which is available for public use, it has a 1000m concrete/asphalt runway.

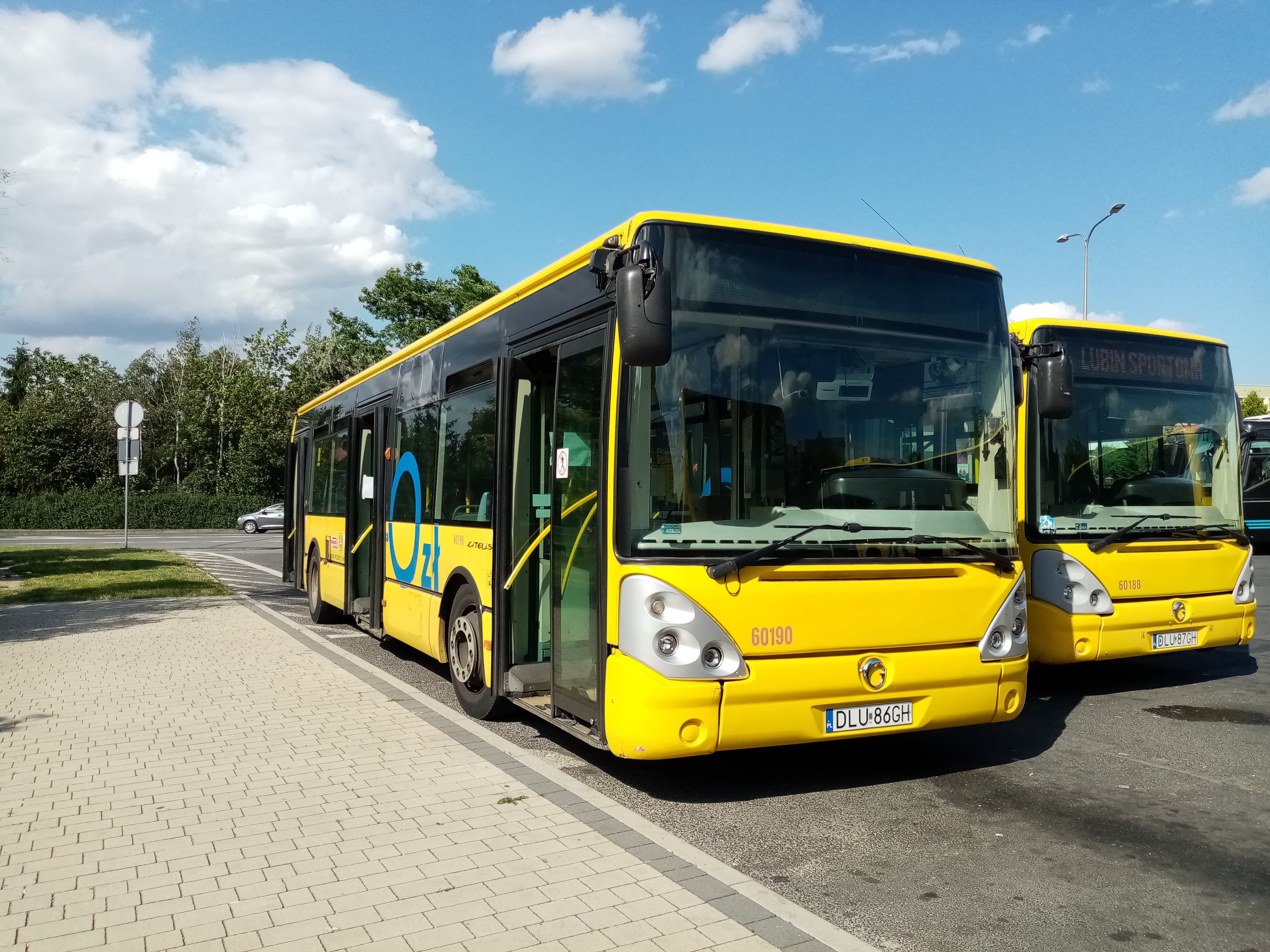
Buses of Lubin public transport

Public transport:

- Lubin currently has free public transport within the city, with the main busses running approximately every 20 minutes.
- Lubin also has the PKS station which offers affordable coach type buses. These buses run between several other cities such as Wrocław, Legnica.

Lubin railway station serves the city, with passenger services operated by Lower Silesian Railways and PKP Intercity.

== Notable people ==
- William I of Württemberg (1781–1864), the second King of Württemberg from 1816 until his death, was born in Lüben, where his father Frederick I served as a commander in the Prussian Army
- Dieter Collin (1893–1918), World War I flying ace
- Gerd von Tresckow (1899–1944), Wehrmacht officer, resistance fighter 20 July plot, elder brother of Henning von Tresckow
- Rudolf von Gersdorff (1905–1980), Wehrmacht officer, one of the few German military anti-Hitler plotters to survive the war
- Peter Schumann (born 1934), founder of the Bread and Puppet Theater
- Tadeusz Maćkała (born 1962), politician
- Kasia Wilk (born 1982), musician
- Mariusz Jurkiewicz (born 1982), handball player
- Natalia Czerwonka (born 1988), speed skater
- Arkadiusz Woźniak (born 1990), football player
- Adrian Błąd (born 1991), football player
- Filip Jagiełło (born 1997), football player
- Mieszko Fortuński (born 1992), professional pool player

== Twin towns – sister cities ==
Lubin is twinned with:

- Rhein-Lahn (district), Germany

== Gallery ==
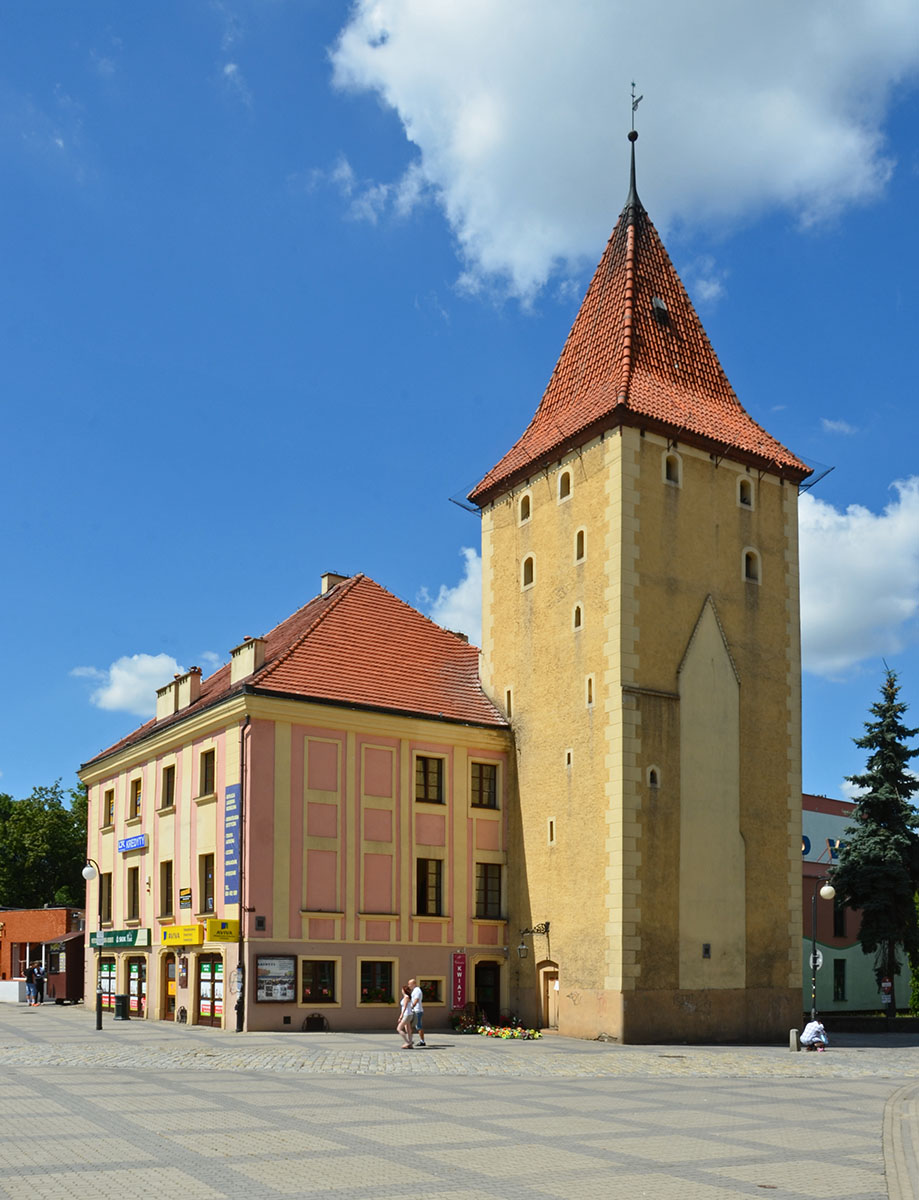
Gothic Głogów Tower (Baszta Głogowska)

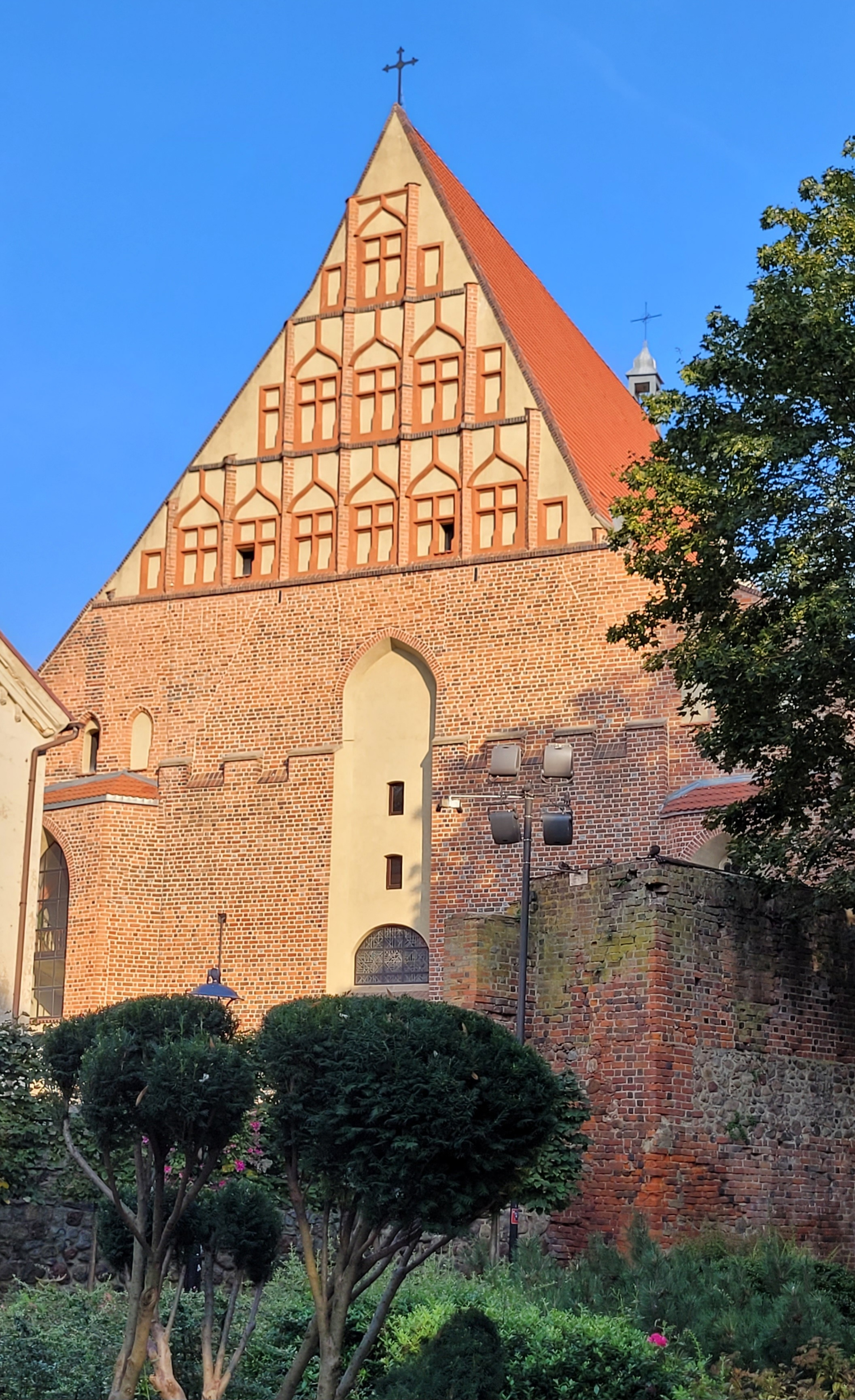
Gothic Our Lady of Częstochowa church

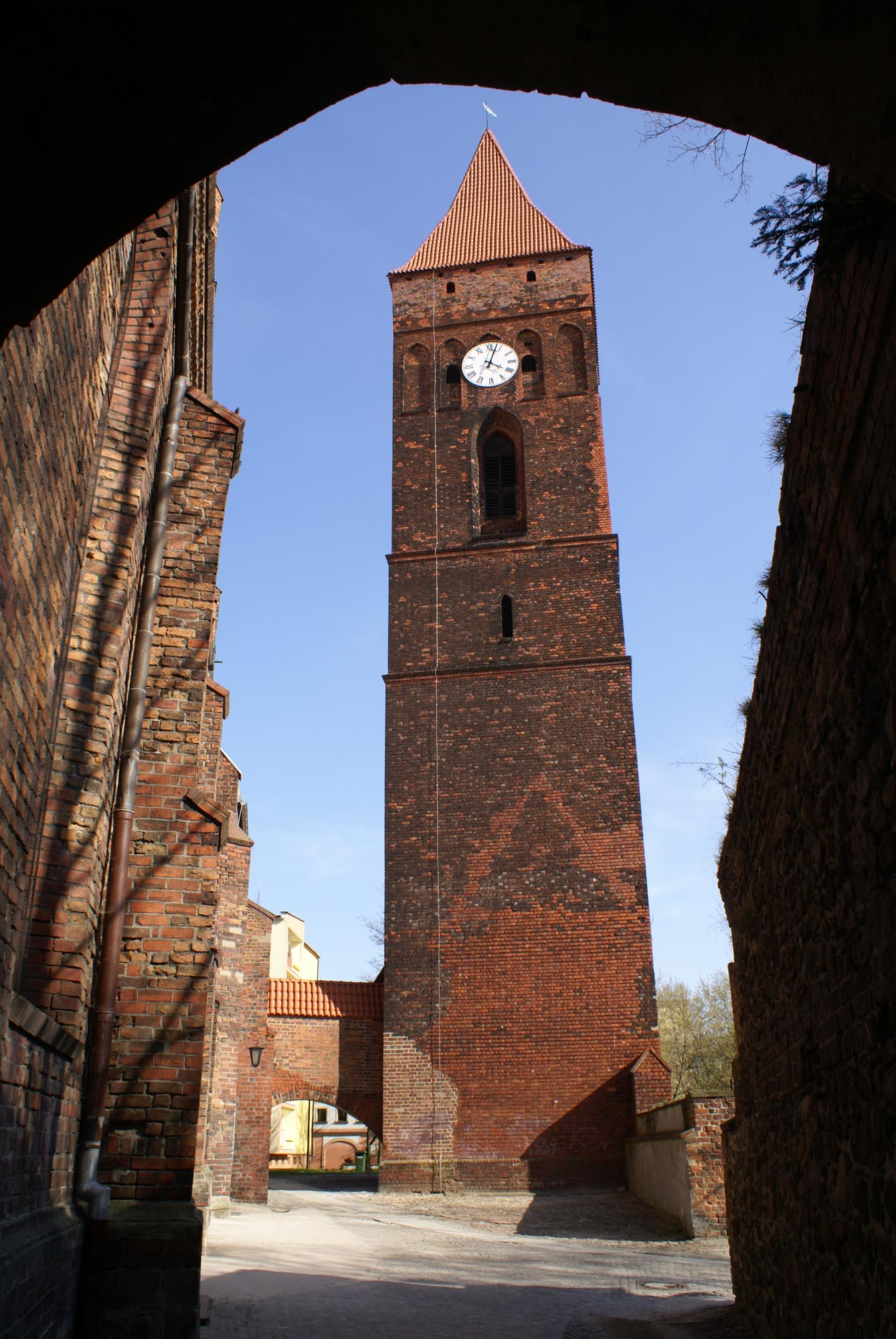
Old bell tower

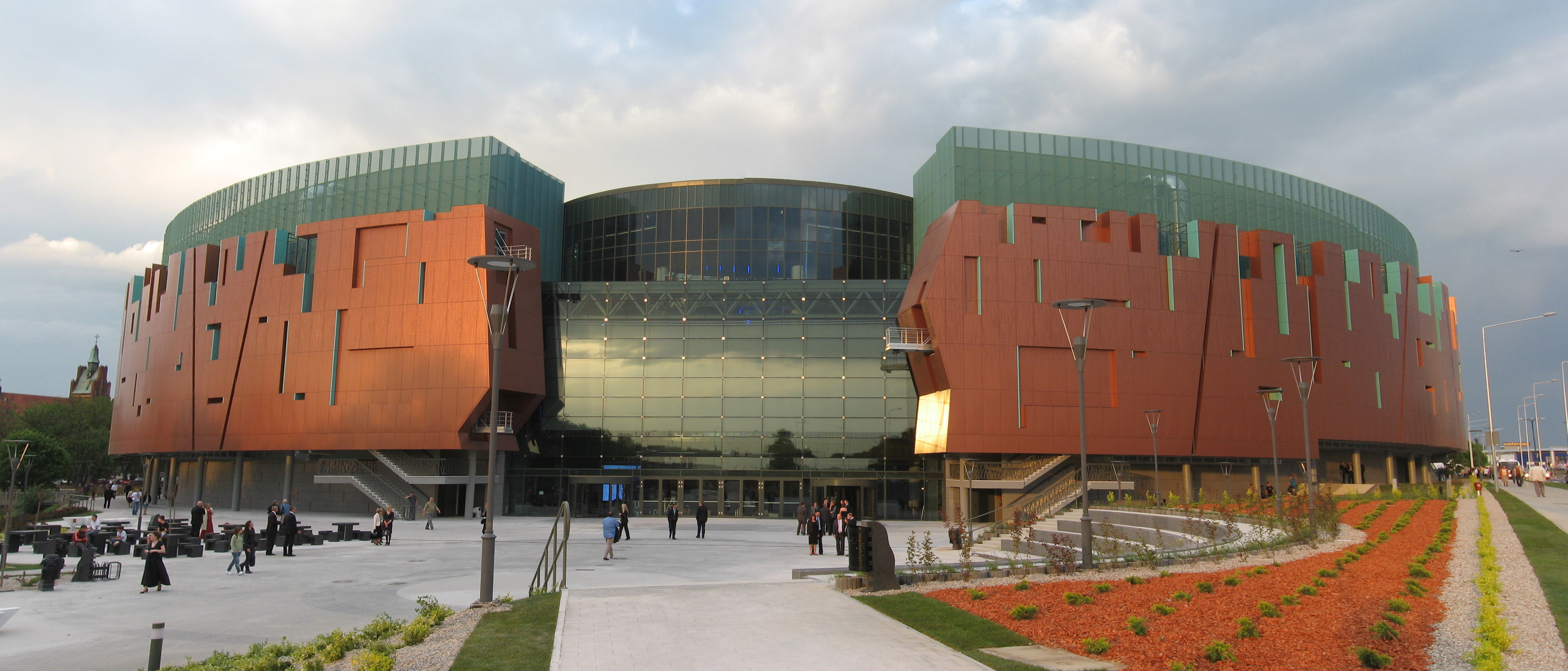
Cuprum Arena Shopping Center

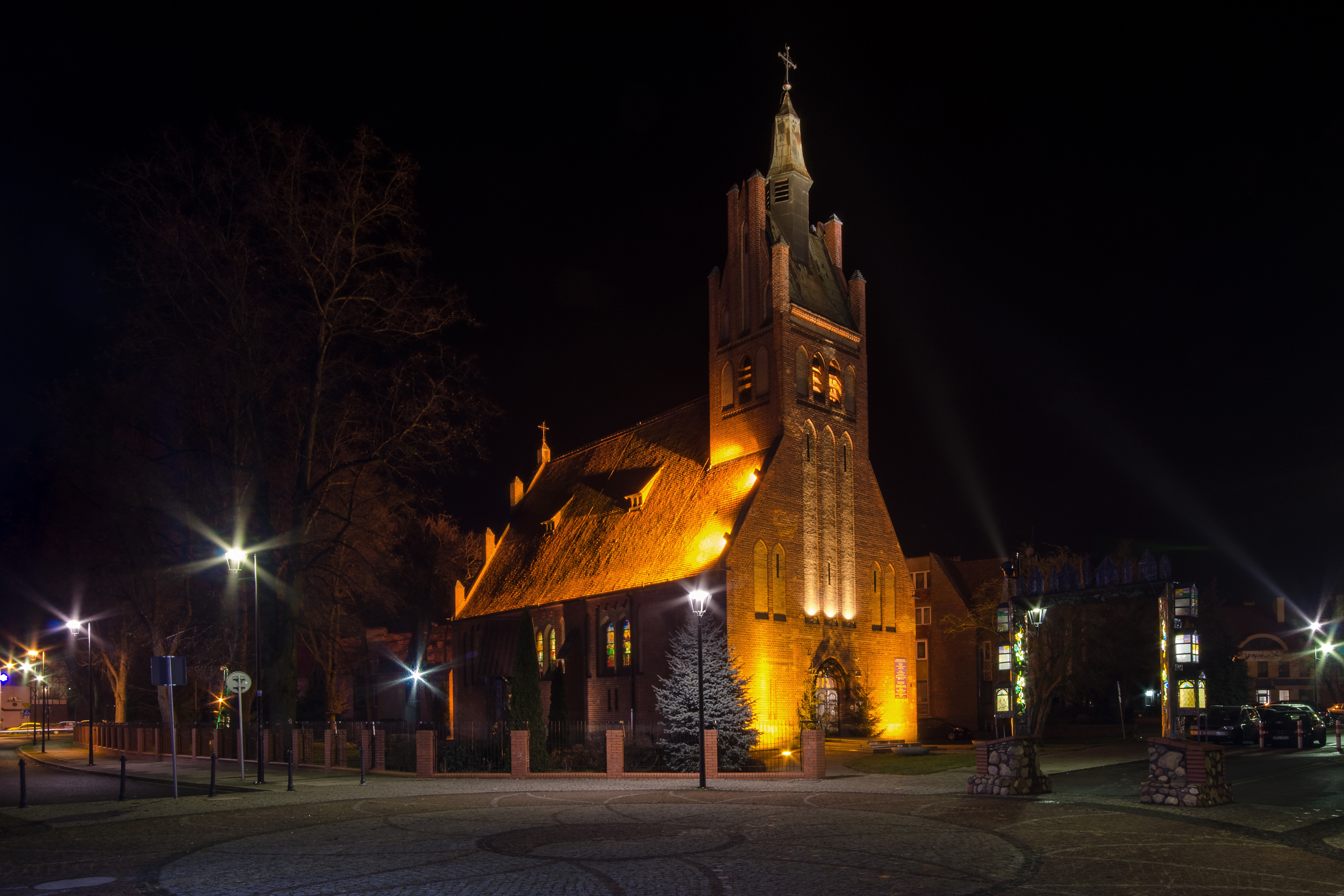
Sacred Heart church

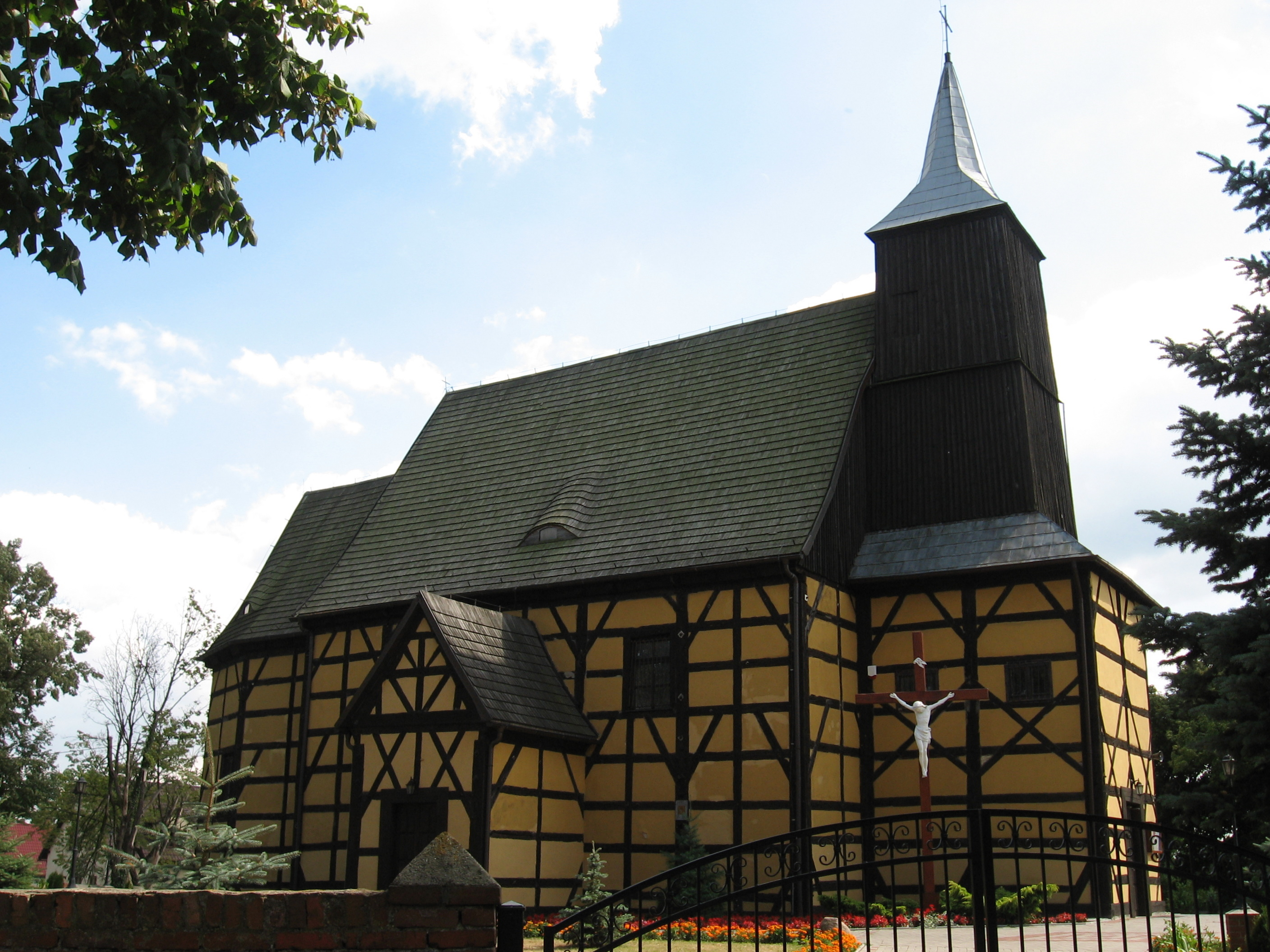
Church of the Nativity of the Virgin Mary

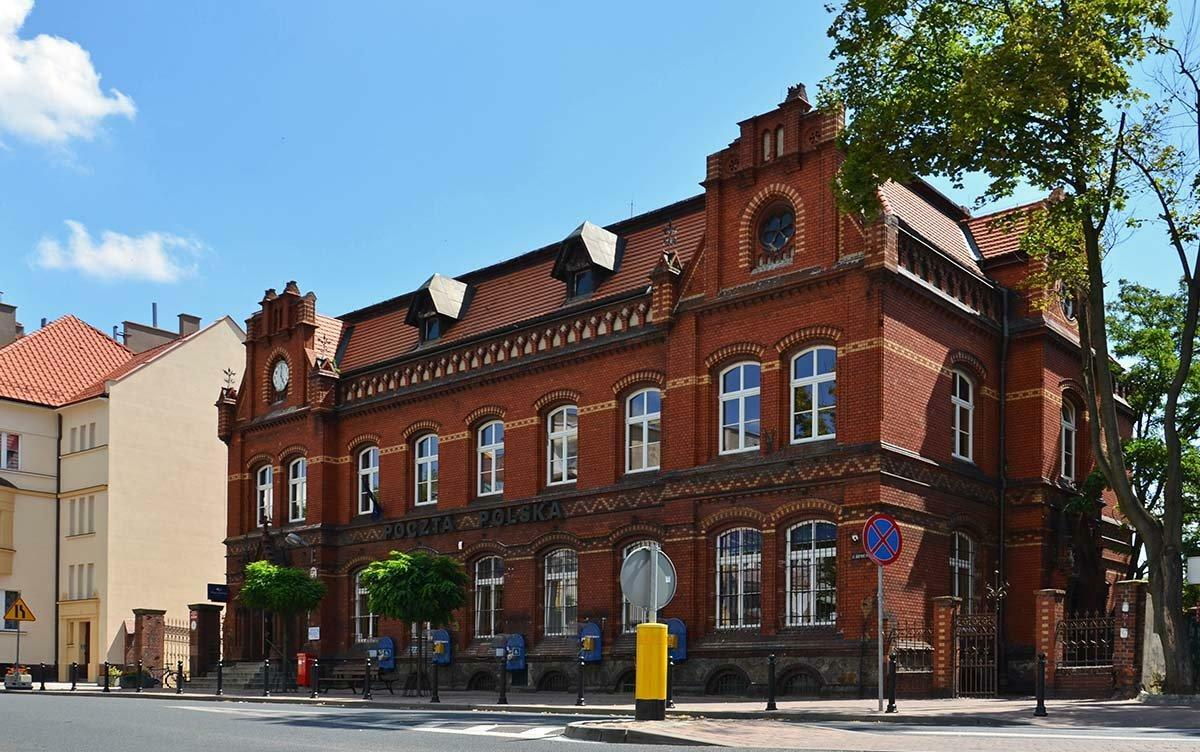
Main post office

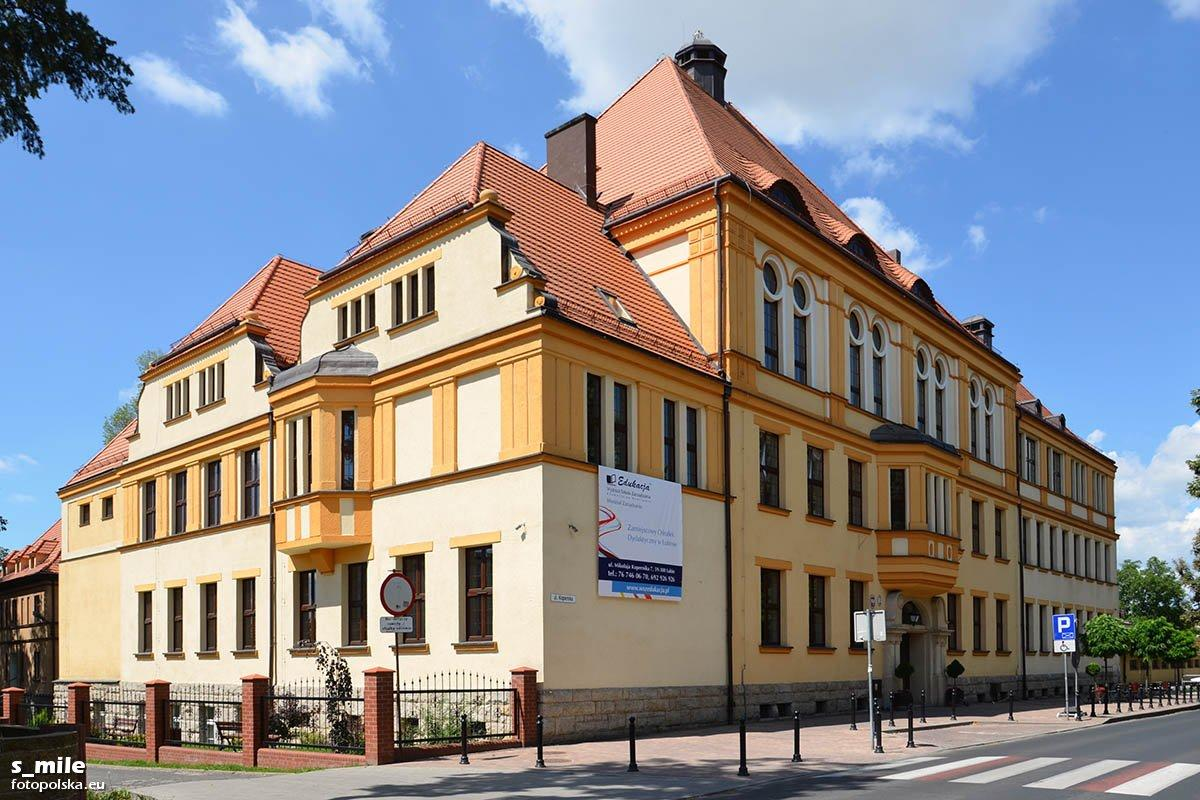
I Liceum Ogólnokształcące (General education liceum No. 1)

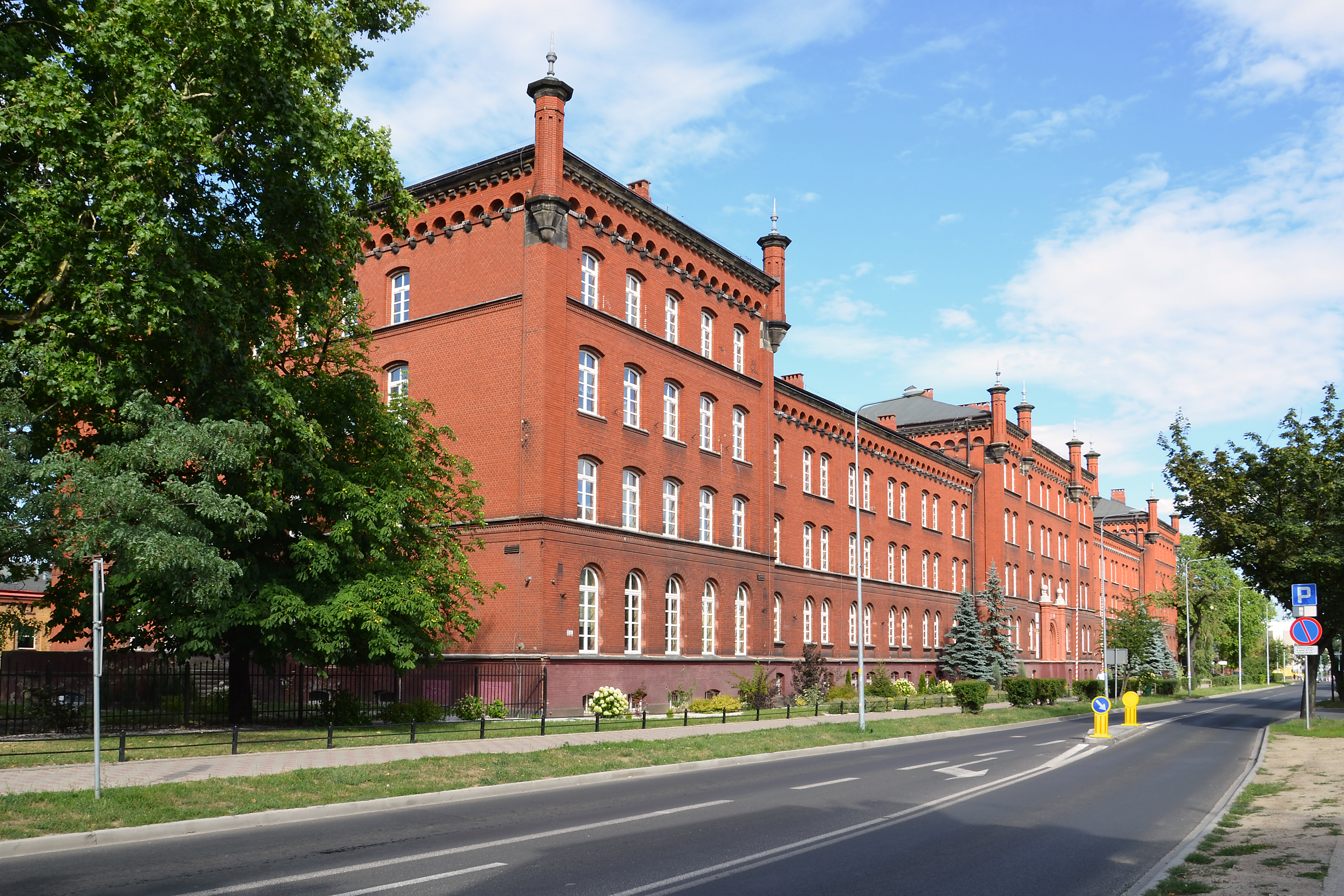
Technical school

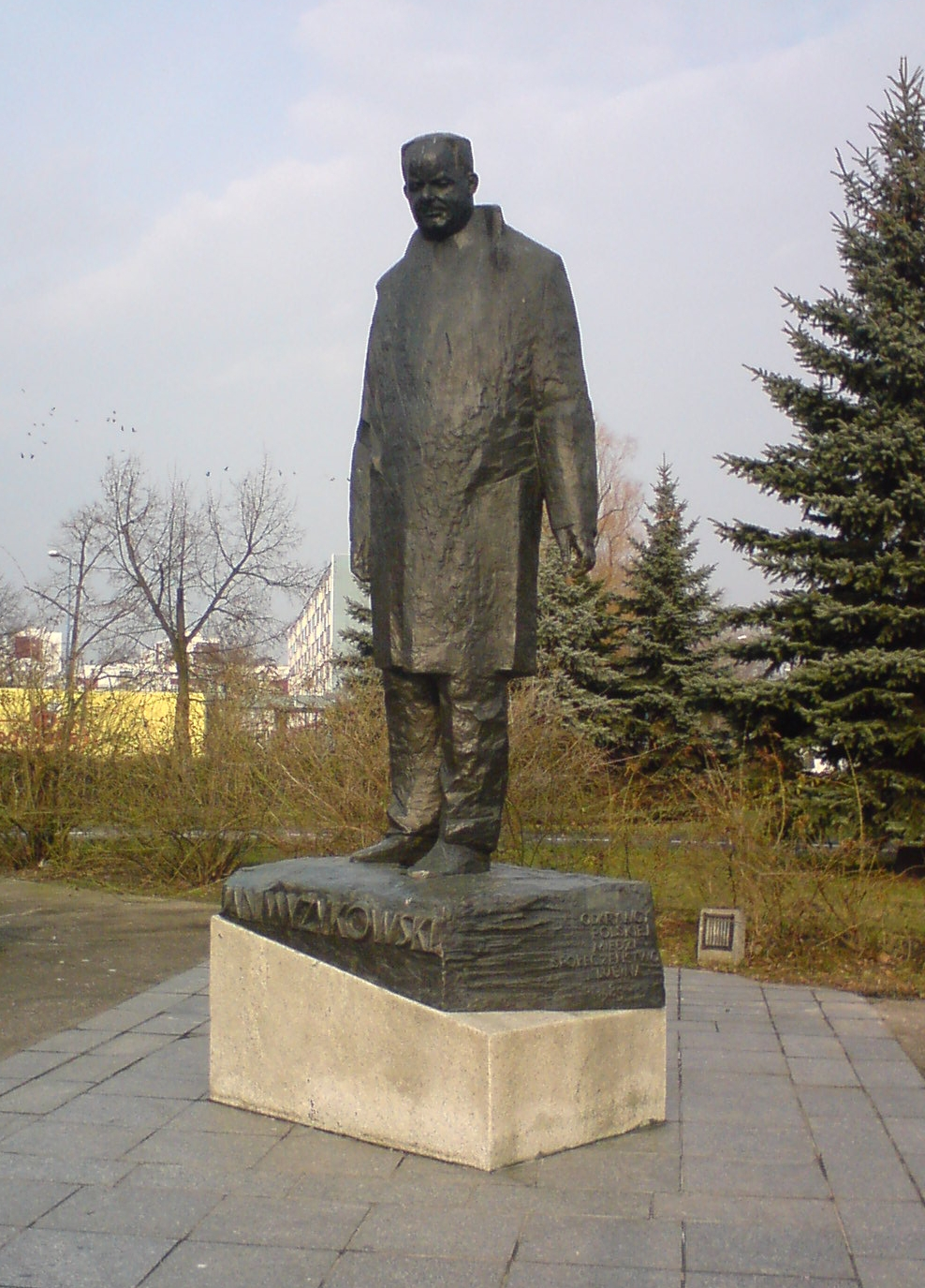
Jan Wyżykowski Monument
