= Jan Wyżykowski =

Polish geologist

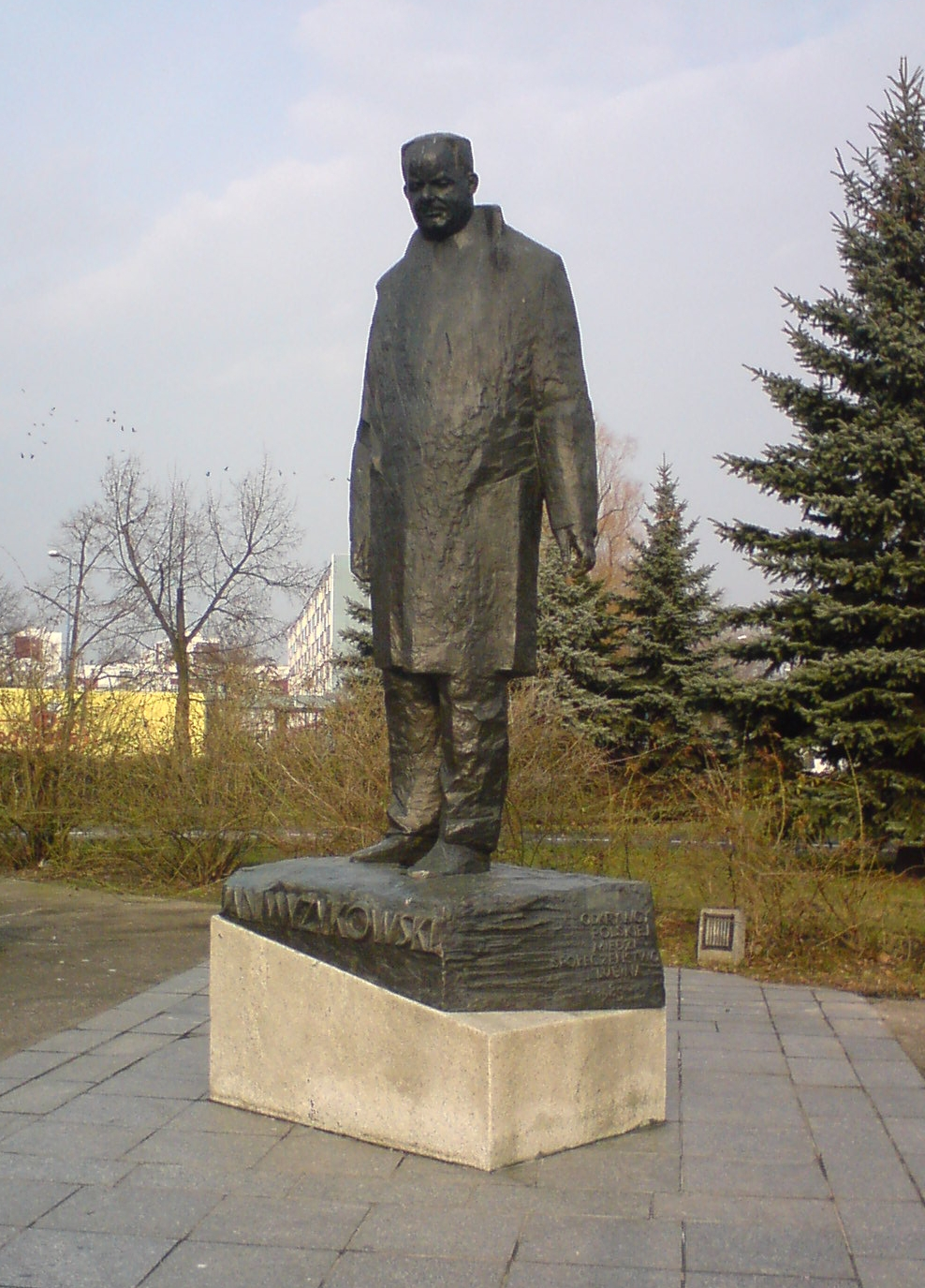
Jan Wyżykowski Monument in Lubin

Jan Wyżykowski (born 31 March 1917 in Haczow, died 29 October 1974 in Warsaw) was a Polish geologist, educated as a mining engineer, a specialist in the geology of copper ore deposits.

== Biography ==
After finishing elementary school in his home town, he attended secondary school in Rozwadów. Then moved to Kraków, where in 1936 he passed his Matura exam in the Jan III Sobieski High School.

Wyżykowski attended a seminary for a short period of time, while also studying opera singing under Professor Bronislaw Romaniszyn. His musical education was interrupted by a throat illness, followed by his philosophical studies at the Jagiellonian University, which were again interrupted by the outbreak of World War II. During the occupation he worked in the Social Insurance Office in Kraków.

After the war Wyżykowski studied at the University of Science and Technology in Kraków. At the same time, in 1948 he started working for the Bytom Coal Industry Association, initially as an assistant, then as a traffic manager in the Łagiewniki and later Radzionków hard coal mines. There, he collected information about the technology and processing of hard coal. In 1950, on the basis of the work „Considering the problem of the advisability of building a central scrubber for coal from the Radzionków, Andalusia and Julian mines due to the size of the output of the concentrate and the amount of coal”, Wyżykowski received the title of engineer-miner and a master's degree in technical sciences.

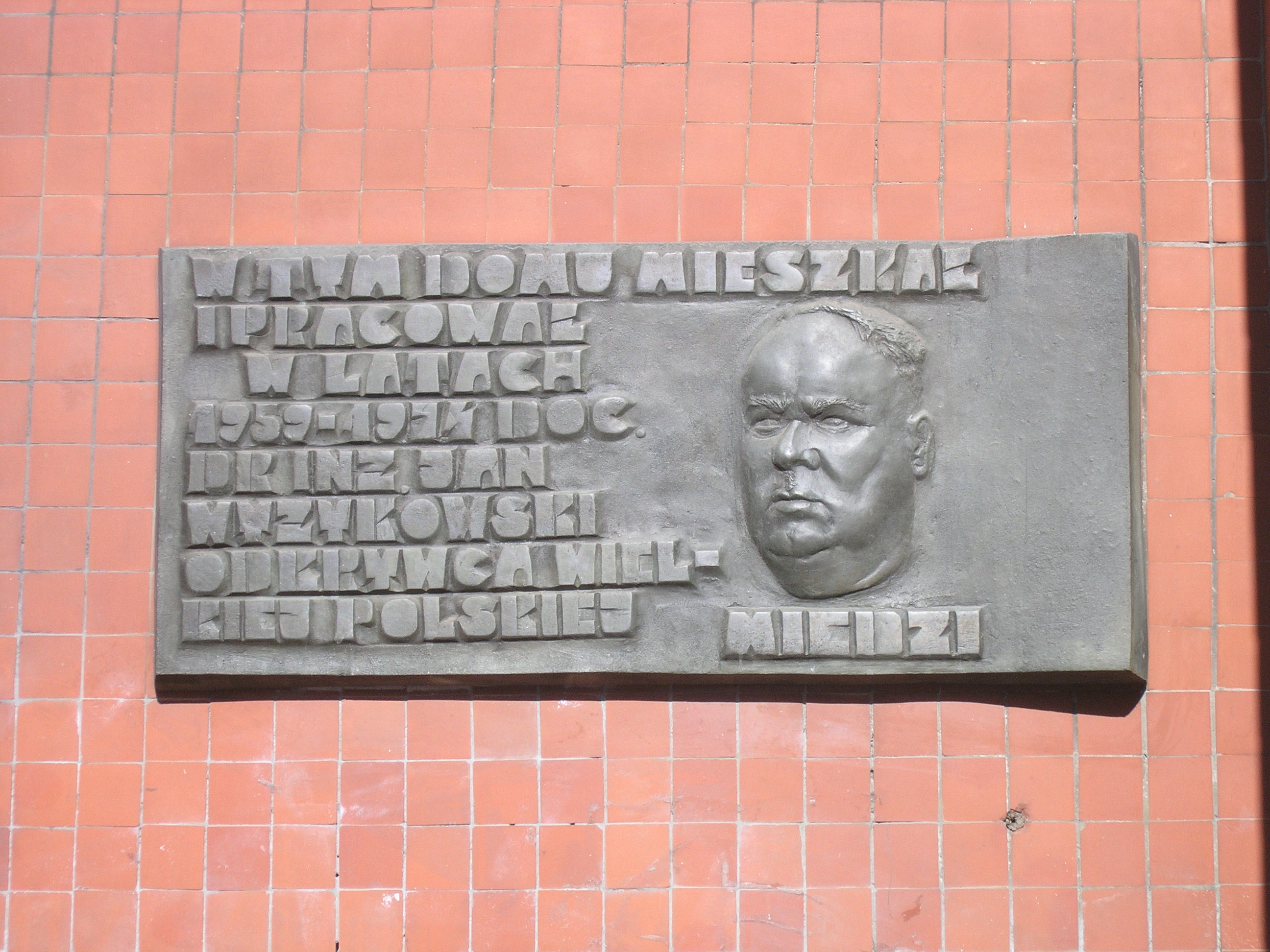
A plaque commemorating Jan Wyżykowski on a tenement house at 32 Chmielna Street in Warsaw where he lived from 1959 to 1974

At the beginning of 1951 he was transferred to the Polish Geological Institute, to the Ore Department, where he was engaged in the exploration of copper ore deposits in Lower Silesia. In the years 1951-1954, Wyżykowski conducted research in the Sudety Basin, near Kamienna Góra - Okrzeszyn, and then in the strip from Głuszyca to Słupca. There, Wyżykowski discovered local concentrations of copper ore in the bituminous shale of the rotliegend. He summarized this research in „The studies on the occurrence of copper in the Sudety Basin and preliminary exploration works on copper ore in the area of Nowa Ruda conducted by the Ore Deposit Department of the Geological Institute in the years 1953-1954" and in „The case of the occurrence of copper in the formations of the Sudety Basin”. In 1954 the Scientific Council of the Geological Institute awarded him the title of Assistant Professor.

In 1951-1952 he participated in the development of a drainage system of the Konrad mine near Złotoryja under the guidance of Professor Roman Krajewski.

Afterwards, Wyżykowski was engaged in the search for copper ore deposits in the Fore-Sudetic Monocline. Initial drilling, based on seismic research of relatively poor quality, proved unsuccessful. It was not until the Sieroszowice drilling hole that he encountered copper ore of industrial importance in the thill layers of the Zechstein at a depth of 656 m on 23 March 1957. A few months later (8 August 1957), a similar quality copper ore was encountered by a second borehole drilled near Lubin. Continuing these discoveries, in 1959 Wyżykowski documented the Lubin-Sieroszowice copper ore deposit, the largest in Europe and one of the largest in the world.

In the following years he continued his exploration work on the Fore-Sudetic Monocline. In 1964 he developed a general project for copper deposits exploration. The implementation of this project allowed him to calculate in 1971 the long-term copper ore resources north of the above-mentioned deposit, at a depth of 1200-1500 m.

In 1965, on the basis of the work „The issue of copper-bearing capacity of Zechstein against the background of the geological structure of the Fore-Sudetic zone”, he obtained the degree of doctor of natural sciences and the position of an independent researcher at the Geological Institute. In 1973 he was appointed an associate professor at the Institute.

In 1974, together with his team, he developed a project for the exploration of Zechstein copper ores in the area of the western part of the Fore-Sudetic Monocline, the Żary pericline and the North-Sudetic basin. His sudden death prevented him from continuing this work.

Jan Wyżykowski's scholarly work includes about 30 published and over 20 archival works.

He received many state distinctions, including the Officer's Cross of the Order of Polonia Restituta (1959) and the Order of the Banner of Labor of the First Class (1970). Moreover, he received the Medal of the 30th Anniversary of the People's Republic of Poland, Medal "For merits to the defense of the country", Medal of the 1000th Anniversary of the Polish State, Medal of Mining in the 1000th Anniversary of the Polish State, as well as the badge of the Meritorious Activist of the Miners' Trade Union, gold badge of the Association of Mining Engineers and Technicians, gold badge of merit for Lower Silesia, badge of the Meritorious Employee of Socialist Work and badge of merit for the Geological Institute. He also received the "Bryła Order” - a symbolic distinction of Life and Modernity (Życie i Nowoczesność), awarded for talent and character. On September 27, 1972 he was granted the honorary citizenship of Lubin.

In 1966, Wyżykowski was awarded the first-degree national team prize in geology, mining and power engineering for his participation in the discovery of the Lubin-Sieroszowice copper ore deposit and the development of the first geological documentation of the said deposit. In 1970 he was one of the recipients in the team prize of the Chairman of the Committee for Science and Technology for the development of a new method of exploration and recognition of zinc and lead ore deposits.

He is buried at the Powazki Military Cemetery in Warsaw (section A35-4-4).

== Commemoration ==
Schools in his hometown of Haczów, as well as in Krotoszyce, Głogów, Polkowice and Lubin are named after Jan Wyżykowski, and since March 2007 also the Polkowice - Sieroszowice mine shaft, located near the borehole where the Lubin copper deposit was first discovered. A monument to Jan Wyżykowski is also located in Lubin. There is an exhibition in the Regional Museum in Brzozów devoted to the life and scientific achievements of Jan Wyżykowski.

Jan Wyżykowski University, based in Polkowice, is also named after him, it was established by merging the Vocational College of the Copper Belt in Lubin and the Lower Silesian School of Enterprise and Technology in Polkowice.

== Selected publications ==
- 1958, Poszukiwanie rud miedzi na obszarze strefy przedsudeckiej. Przegląd Geologiczny, 1, Warszawa.
- 1961, Północno-zachodni zasięg krystalinikum przedsudeckiego i możliwości poszukiwań cechsztyńskich rud miedzi w tym rejonie. Prz. Geol. 4, Warszawa.
- 1963, Najnowsze wyniki badań geologicznych w rejonie Kożuchowa. Prz. Geol. 4, Warszawa.
- 1964, Utwory czerwonego spągowca na Przedgórzu Sudetów. Prz. Geol. 7/8, Warszawa.
- 1964, Zagadnienie miedzionośności cechsztynu na tle budowy geologicznej strefy przedsudeckiej. Prace Instytutu Geologicznego.
- 1967, Kierunki poszukiwań złóż rud miedzi. Prz. Geol. 10, Warszawa.
- 1971, Cechsztyńska formacja miedzionośna w Polsce. Prz. Geol. 3, Warszawa.

== Literature ==
- Edward Ciuk, 1976, Jan Wyżykowski 1917-1974, Rocznik Polskiego Towarzystwa Geologicznego, vol. XLVI, z. 4, str. 573-577, Kraków.
- Andrzej Rydzewski, 1996., Odkrycie złoża Lubin-Sieroszowice – wspomnienia o współpracy z Janem Wyżykowskim. Wiadomości Państwowego Instytutu Geologicznego, nr 11, listopad 1996
- Rydzewski A., 2002. Jan Wyżykowski. Wiadomości Państwowego Instytutu Geologicznego, nr 3.
