= Castle Chapel in Lubin =

Castle chapel in Lubin, Poland

Coordinates: 51°23′47″N 16°12′29″E

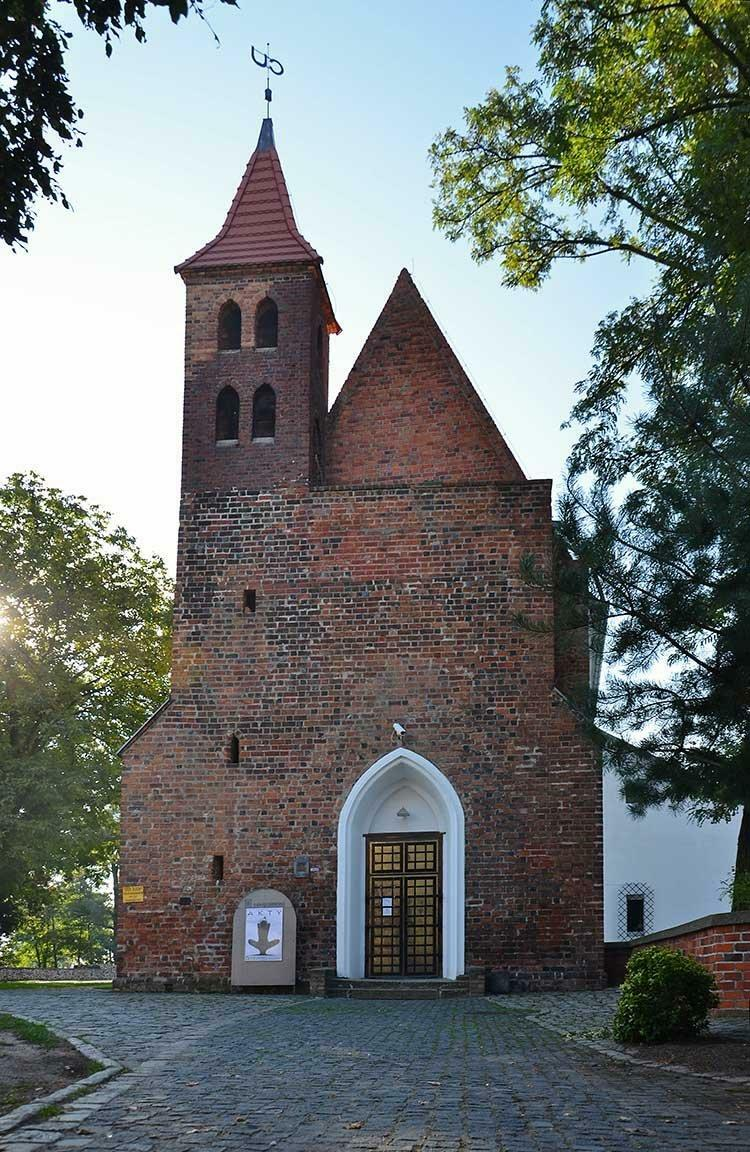
Castle chapel in Lubin - front view

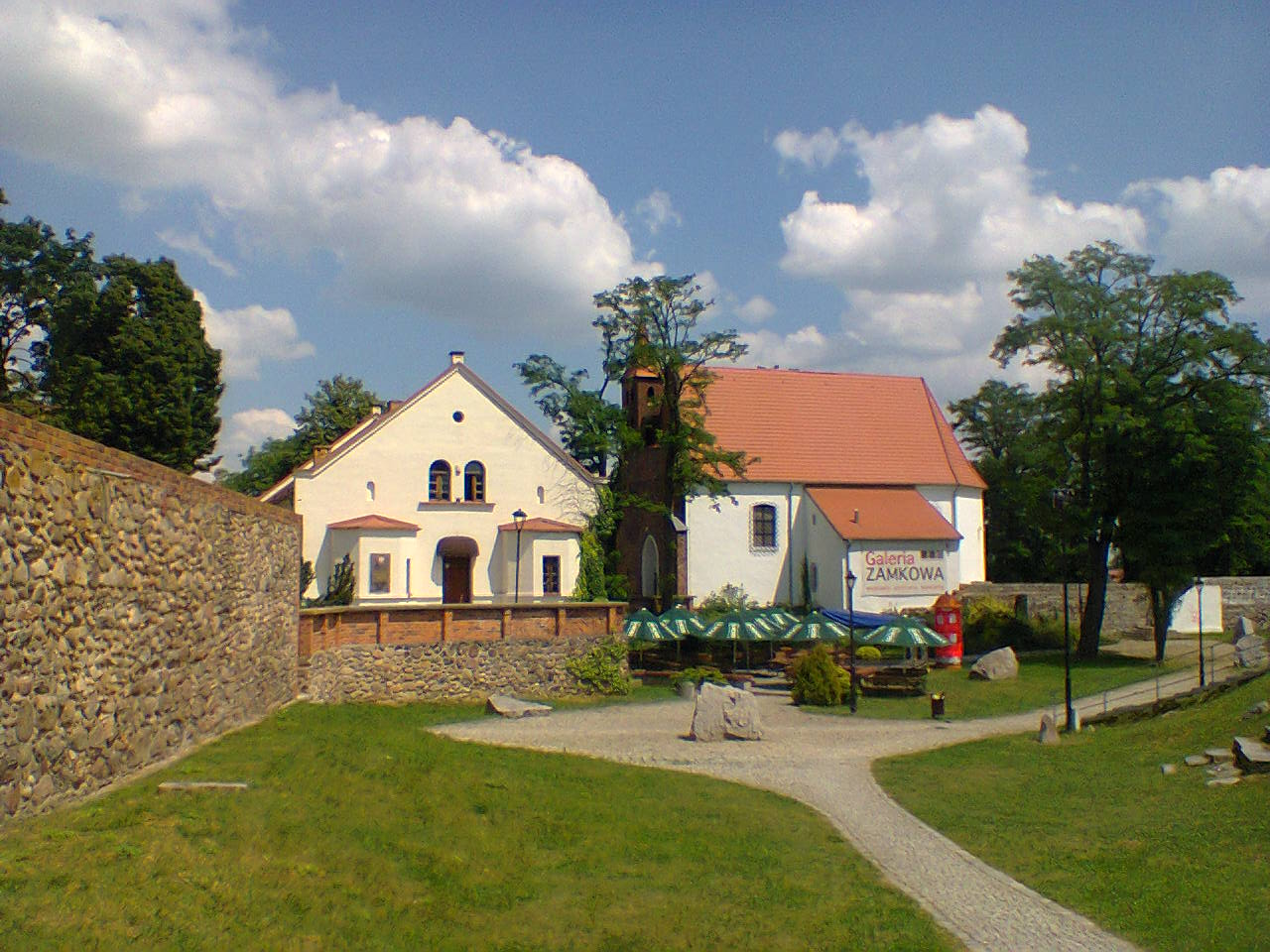
Hedwig Gallery and the castle chapel

The Castle Chapel in Lubin is located on Mikołaj Pruzio Street on the Castle Hill in Lubin, Poland. The chapel is the only element left from the medieval castle buildings (it originally stood next to the entrance gate in the castle courtyard). The date in the tympanum - 1349 - determines the time of construction. It had 3 altars in the 14th century. The chapel was destroyed during the Thirty Years' War, rebuilt in 18th century and fell into ruins again. After reconstruction in the middle of the 19th century it served Catholics until 1908, then it housed a diocesan library. In 1945 it was set on fire. For many years after the war the building remained devastated. In the end of the 1970s the sanctuary was renovated. The chapel was initially managed by the Office of Artistic Exhibitions in Legnica. After the renovation the building was adapted as the Castle Gallery in 1990. In 2005-2009 further renovation works were carried out.

The building (on the plan of 13.5 x 8.1 m, 1.2 m thick walls) may have had no separate presbytery. It was a structure with a flat roof and the main entrance from the north. The Baroque reconstruction lengthened the chapel and the presbytery from the south by two annexes. The entire building was fitted with large windows, covered with plaster and topped with a high, gabled roof.

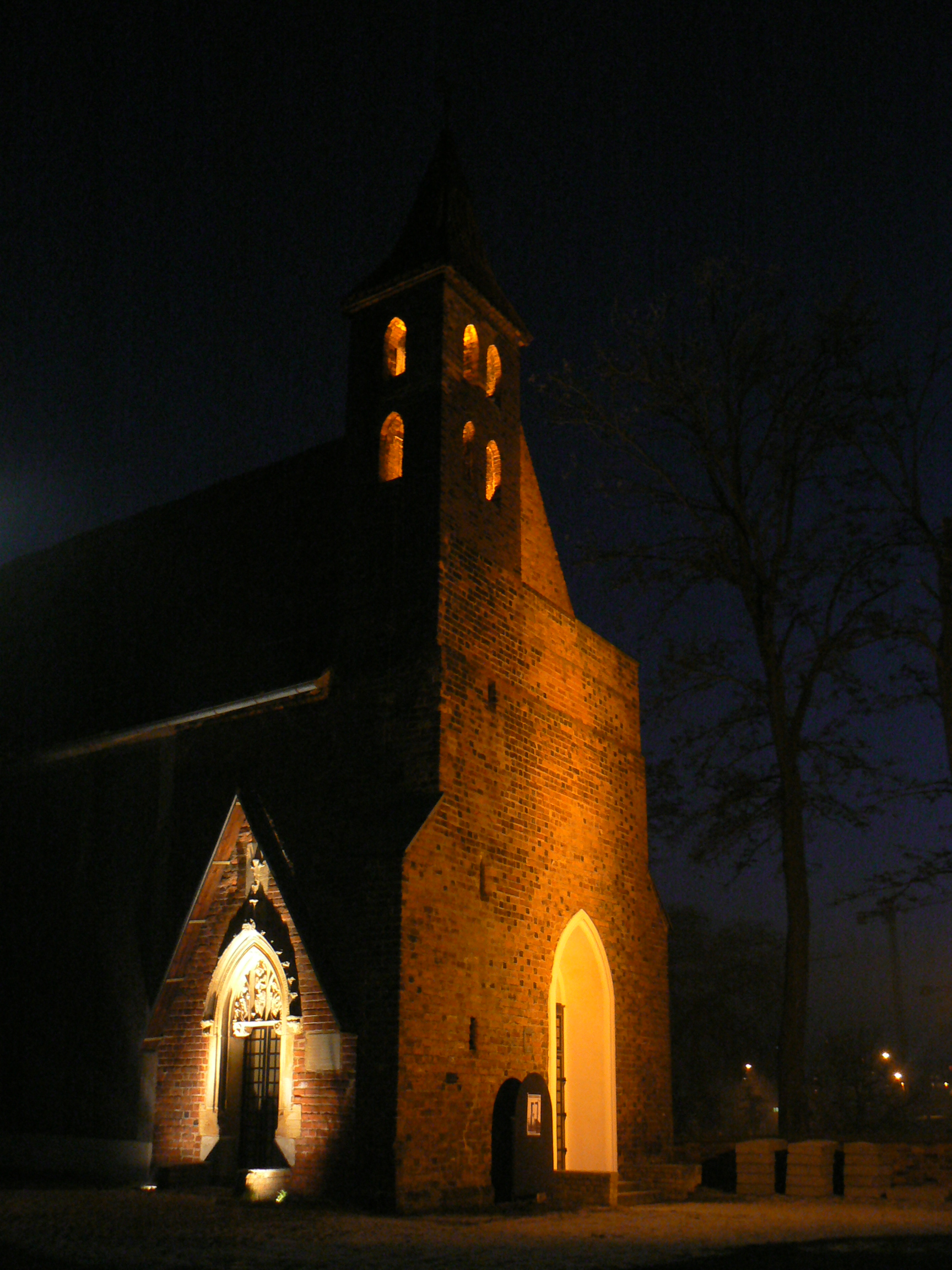
Illumination of the chapel

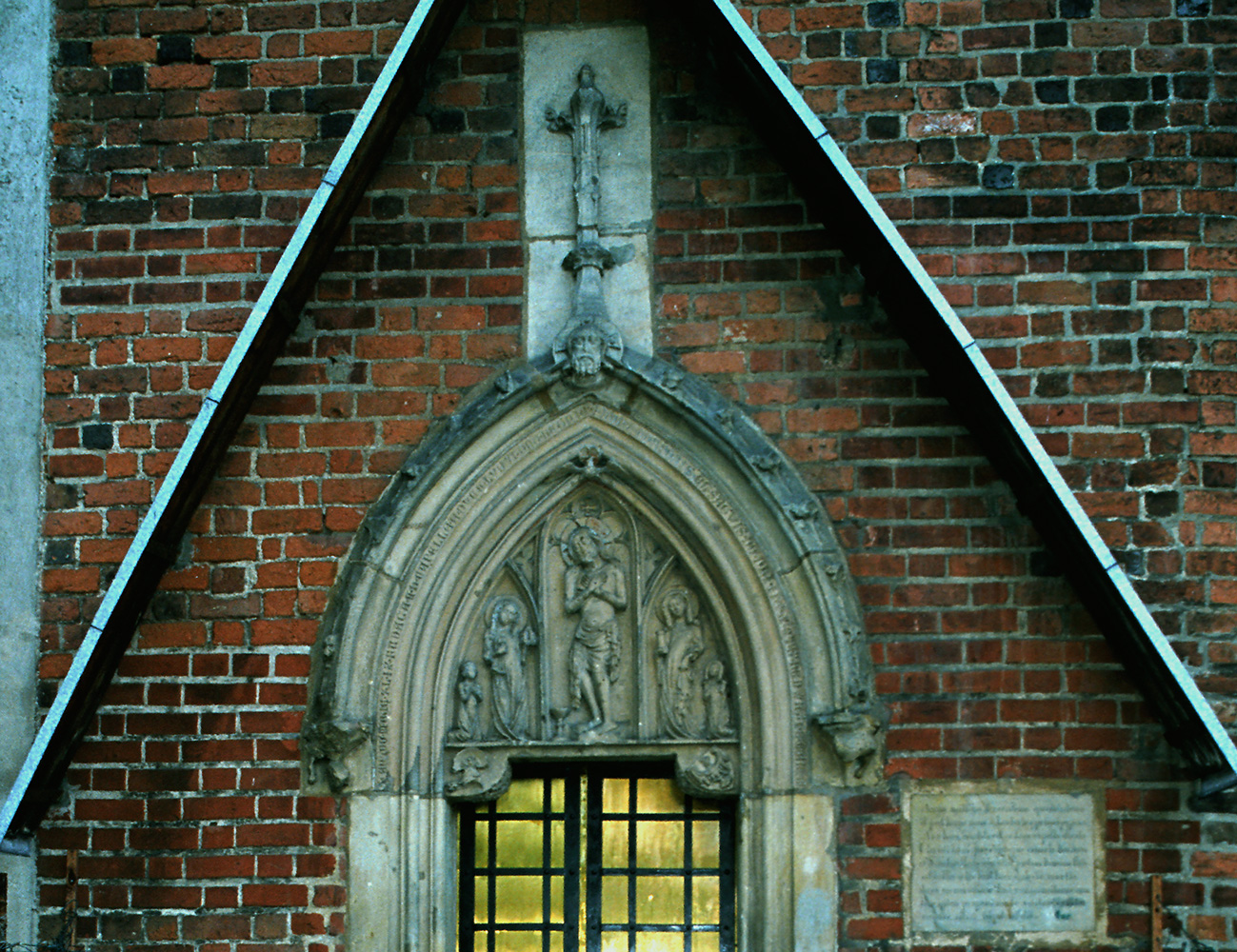
Tympanum over the northern portal

The tympanum above the northern portal from 1349 is the most valuable one, depicting Christ of Sorrow, St. Hedwig and St. Magdalene on the right. The relief composes of a scene of adoration in the sharp-edged area of the tympanum, divided into three arcades. Christ of Sorrows, leaning slightly to the left, stands in the middle; according to the medieval depiction of the hierarchy - figures of St. Hedwig (on the left) and St. Mary Magdalene, as less important, are presented by the artist in smaller proportions. Kneeling at the feet of these saints in an even smaller representation is Prince Louis (the patron saint is his great-grandmother St. Hedwig), and on the opposite side his wife Princess Agnes of Żagań. In the curve of the archivolt closing the tympanum, at the top of which is the symbol of the Holy Spirit, there is a foundation inscription in Latin. The translation reads: "In the year of the Lord 1349, this chapel was founded by Prince Louis, Lord of Legnica, for the glory of the body and blood of our Lord Jesus Christ and Hedwig and Mary Magdalene". The outer archivolt is decorated with heavily damaged crockets. It is bound by a key with the head of Christ. The sculpture work of the tympanum is characterized by decorative and natural folds of robes, the elegant curves of the figures allow to consider it as fine example of the style of soft Silesian Gothic sculpture.
