= Chechło =

Chechło may refer to the following places in Poland:

- Chechło, Lesser Poland Voivodeship
- Chechło, Silesian Voivodeship
- Chechło Pierwsze Łódź Voivodeship (First Chechło)
- Chechło Drugie Łódź Voivodeship (Second Chechło)
