= Mogilno (disambiguation) =

Mogilno is a town in Kuyavian-Pomeranian Voivodeship (north-central Poland).

Mogilno may also refer to:

- Mogilno, Lesser Poland Voivodeship (south Poland)
- Mogilno, Łódź Voivodeship (central Poland)
- Mogilno County, a unit of territorial administration and local government (powiat)

== See also ==
- Gmina Mogilno, an urban-rural gmina (administrative district) in Mogilno County, Kuyavian-Pomeranian Voivodeship
- Mogilno Duże, a village in the administrative district of Gmina Dobroń
- Mogilno Małe, a village in the administrative district of Gmina Dobroń
- Kreis Mogilno, one of many Kreise (counties) in the northern administrative district of Bromberg, in the Prussian province of Posen
