= Danube–Oder Canal =

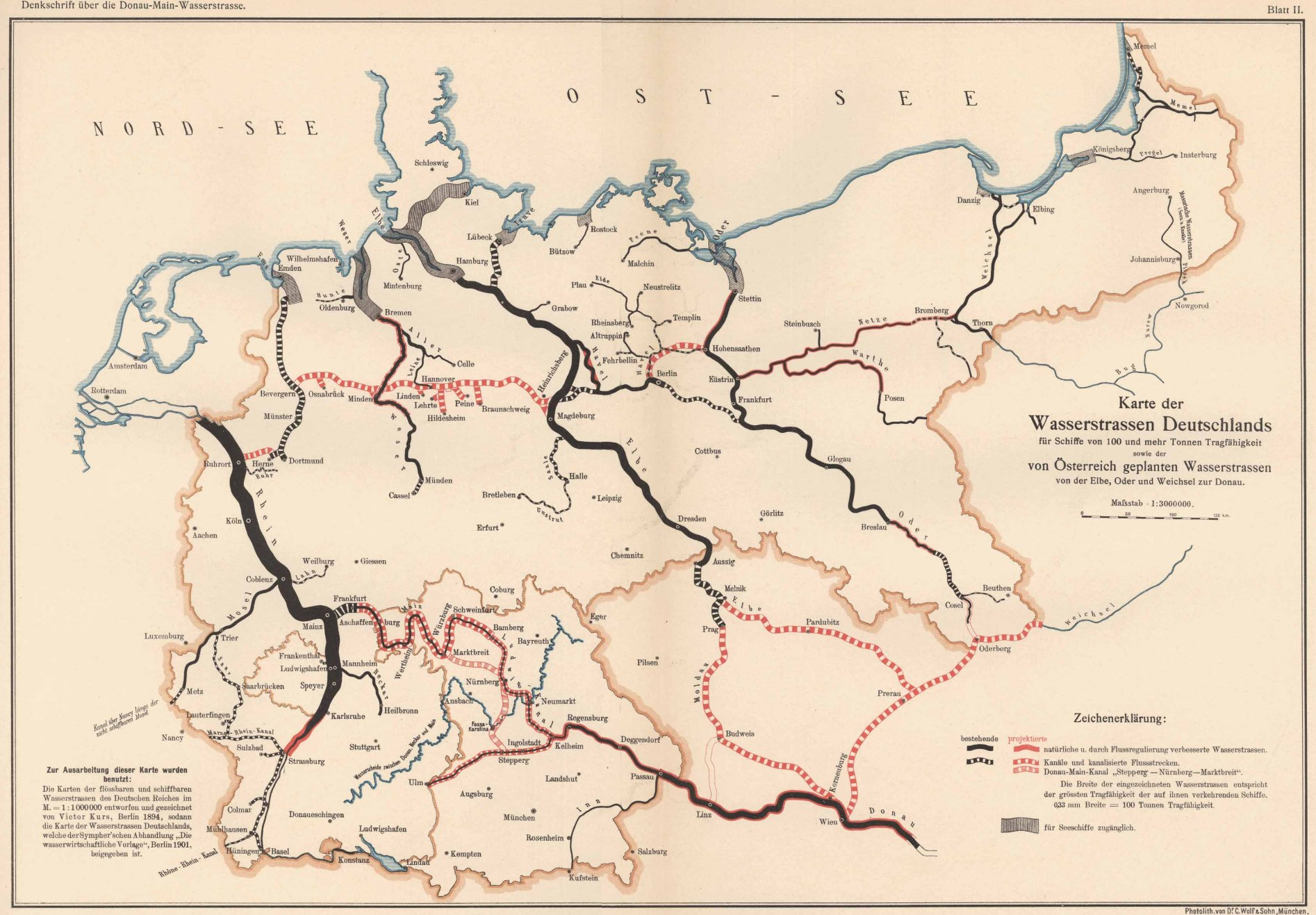
Waterways as existing and planned in 1903 Germany and Austria

The Danube–Oder Canal (German: Donau-Oder-Kanal; Polish: Kanał Odra-Dunaj; Czech: Kanál Odra-Dunaj) was a planned, partially constructed, and in 2023 definitely cancelled artificial waterway in the Lobau floodplain of the Danube at Vienna, that was supposed to stretch along the Morava River to the Oder at the city of Kędzierzyn-Koźle in Poland.

== Overview ==
The Holy Roman Emperor Charles IV had envisioned a waterway capable of taking ships from the Oder to the Danube in the 14th century. Records of further plans for such a waterway stem from the 19th century. During the Nazi era, the idea was reborn and the project was put into motion. The project would connect the Oder to the Danube through the Moravian region of the Czech Republic, stretching 320 kilometres and spanning an elevation of 124 metres.

On 8 December 1939, Rudolf Hess inaugurated the then-named Adolf Hitler Canal, today Gliwice Canal (Polish: Kanał Gliwicki) from Kędzierzyn-Koźle at the Oder River to the city of Gliwice, that replaced the historic Kłodnica Canal finished in 1812. At the same time, Hess also performed the groundbreaking ceremony for the further Donau-Oder-Kanal. The work on the Upper Silesian side was already discontinued in 1940. Only a few kilometres of the planned 40-km long channel from Vienna to Angern at the Morava River were actually dug in the years up to 1943, mainly in the areas around the Lobau floodplain in the Donaustadt district of Vienna and the adjacent town of Groß-Enzersdorf. The branch-off at the Danube, just under 100 metres long, is still clearly recognizable today, connecting the Ölhafen Lobau of the OMV oil company. Two further sections are today used for swimming and fishing.

Between 1964 and 1970, a part of the original plans gained attention from Poland again and an offshoot of the Gliwice Canal was constructed. The short, finished arm east of Kędzierzyn-Koźle is known as Kanal Kędzierzynski and serves to connect the nitrogen factory Azoty Kędzierzyn AG to the Oder.

The waterway today is again part of plans for a European Danube–Oder–Elbe Canal project that would also connect the Elbe river. In 2023, the Czech government cancelled the project.

== Gallery ==
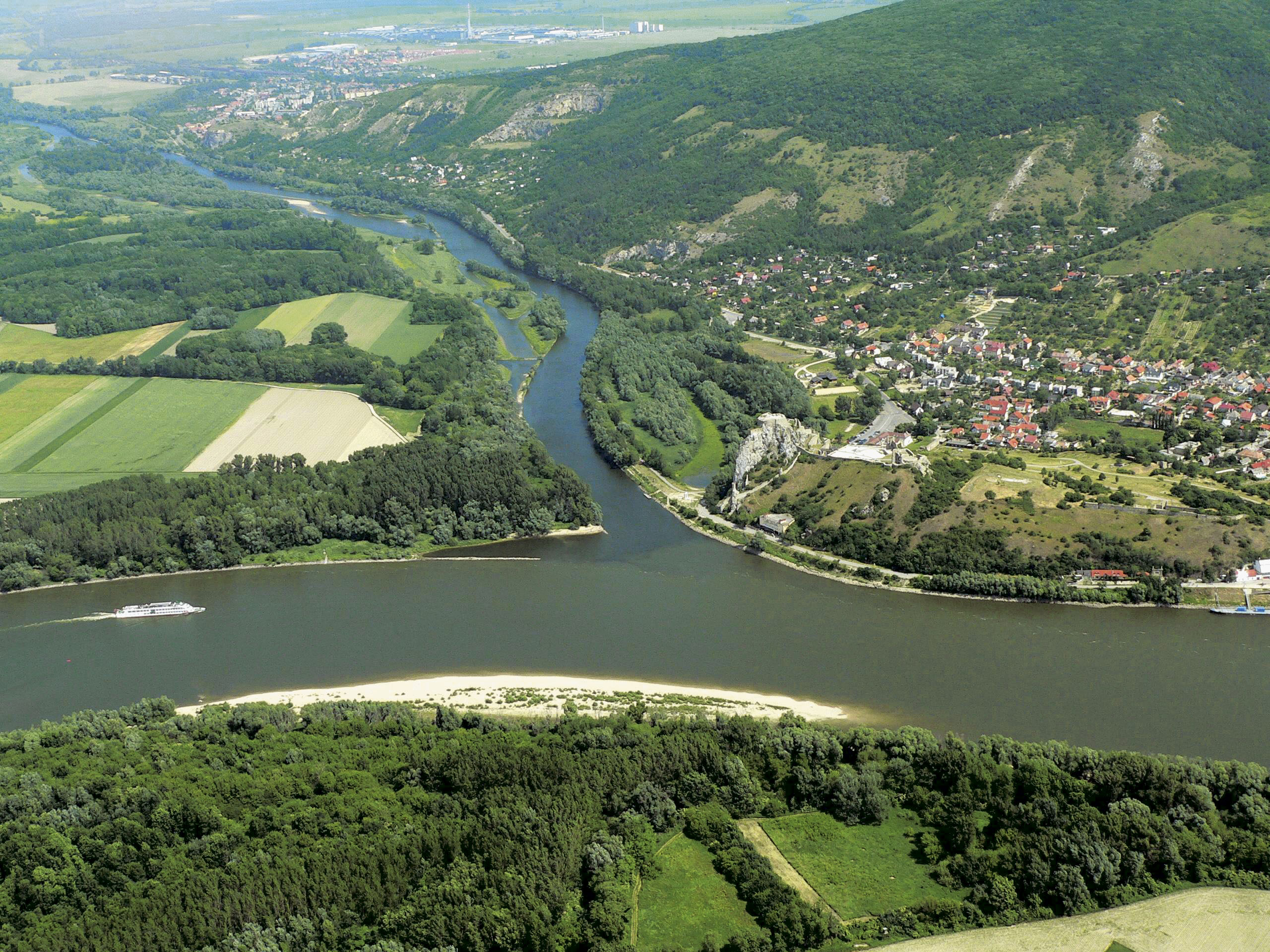
Water corridor D-O-E, beginning of route at Devín (var. A a D)

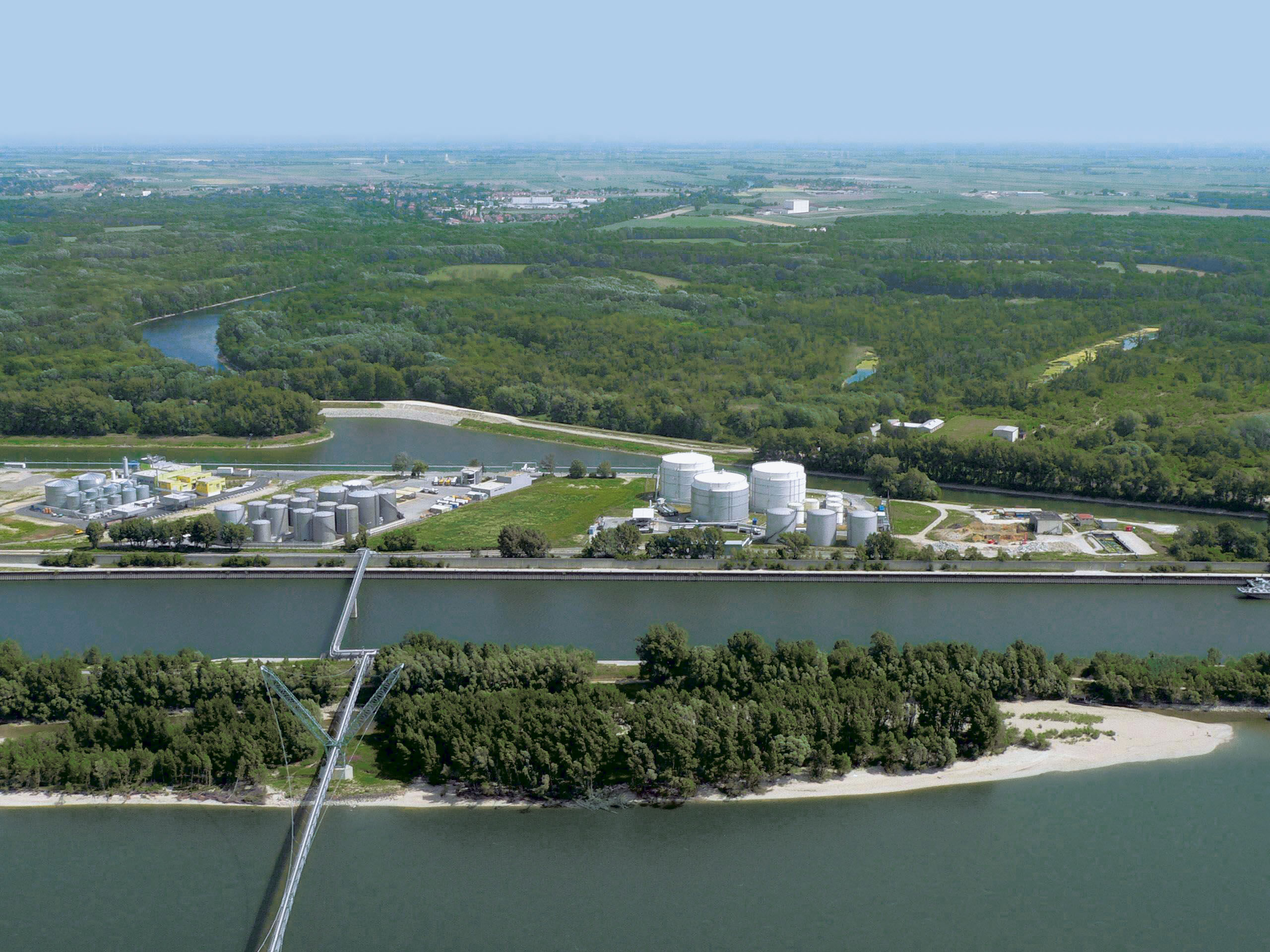
Water corridor D-O-E, beginning of route at Vienna (var. B a C)

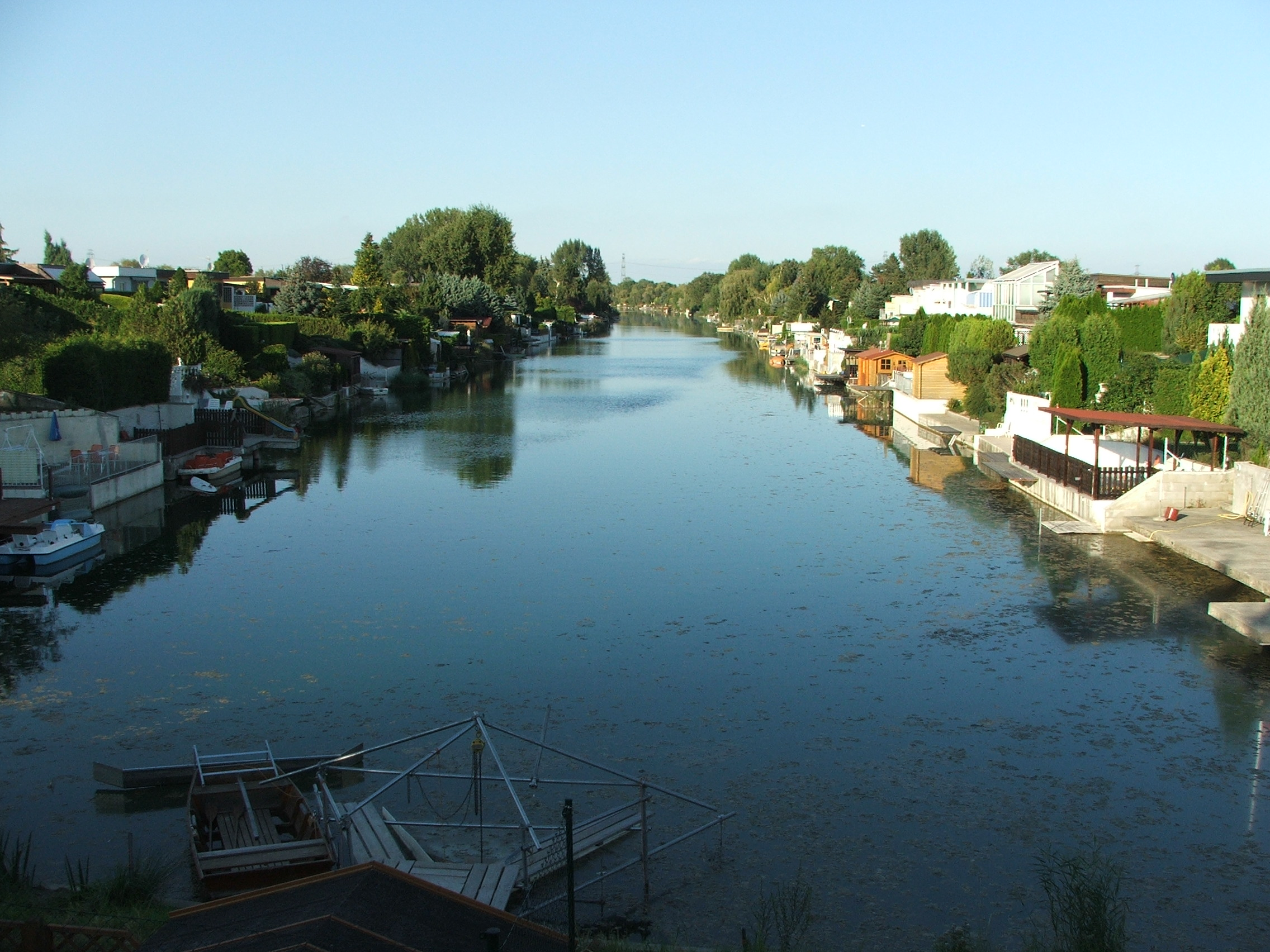
Danube–Oder Canal, finished part near Vienna

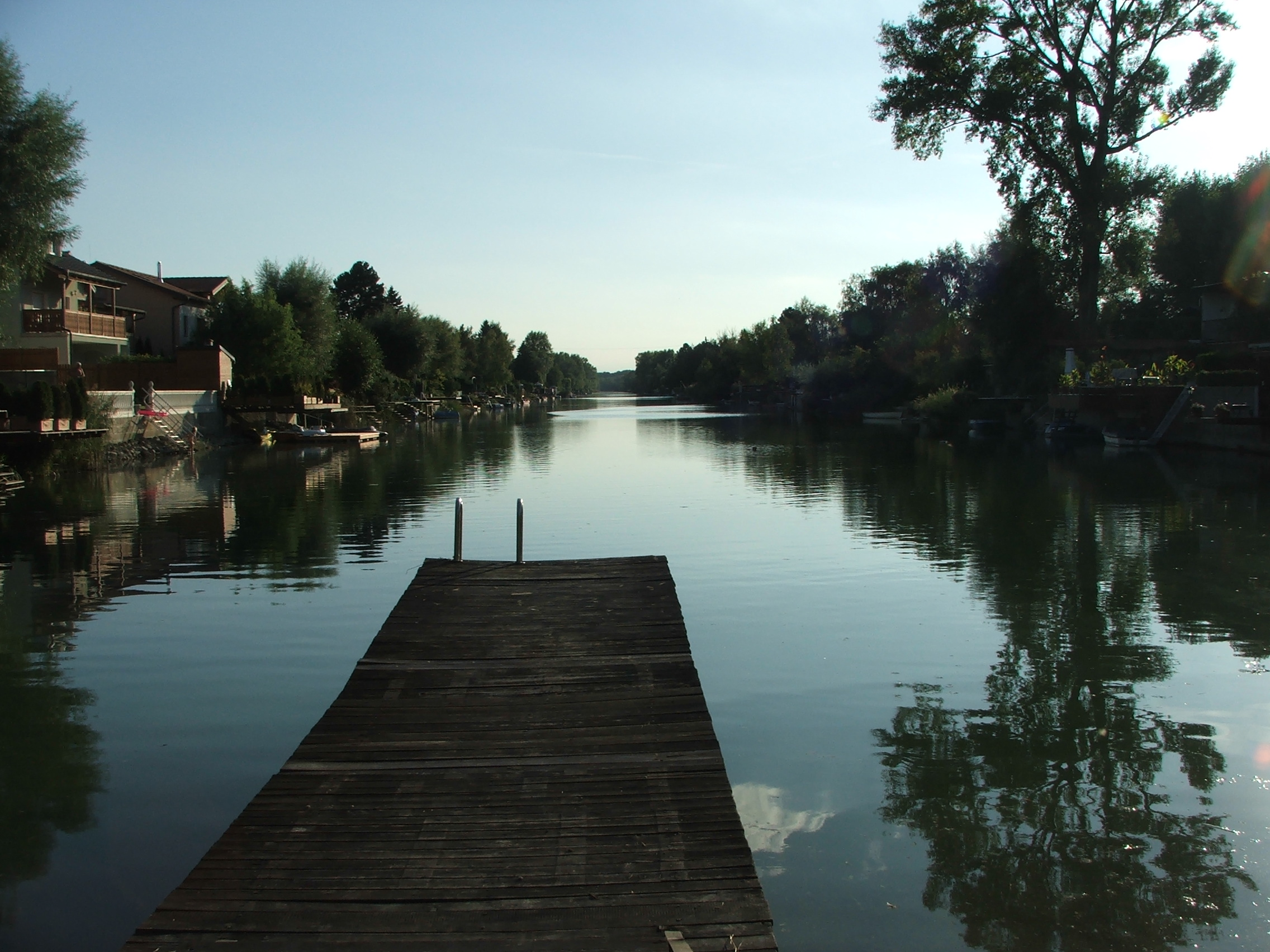
Danube–Oder Canal, another finished part near Vienna

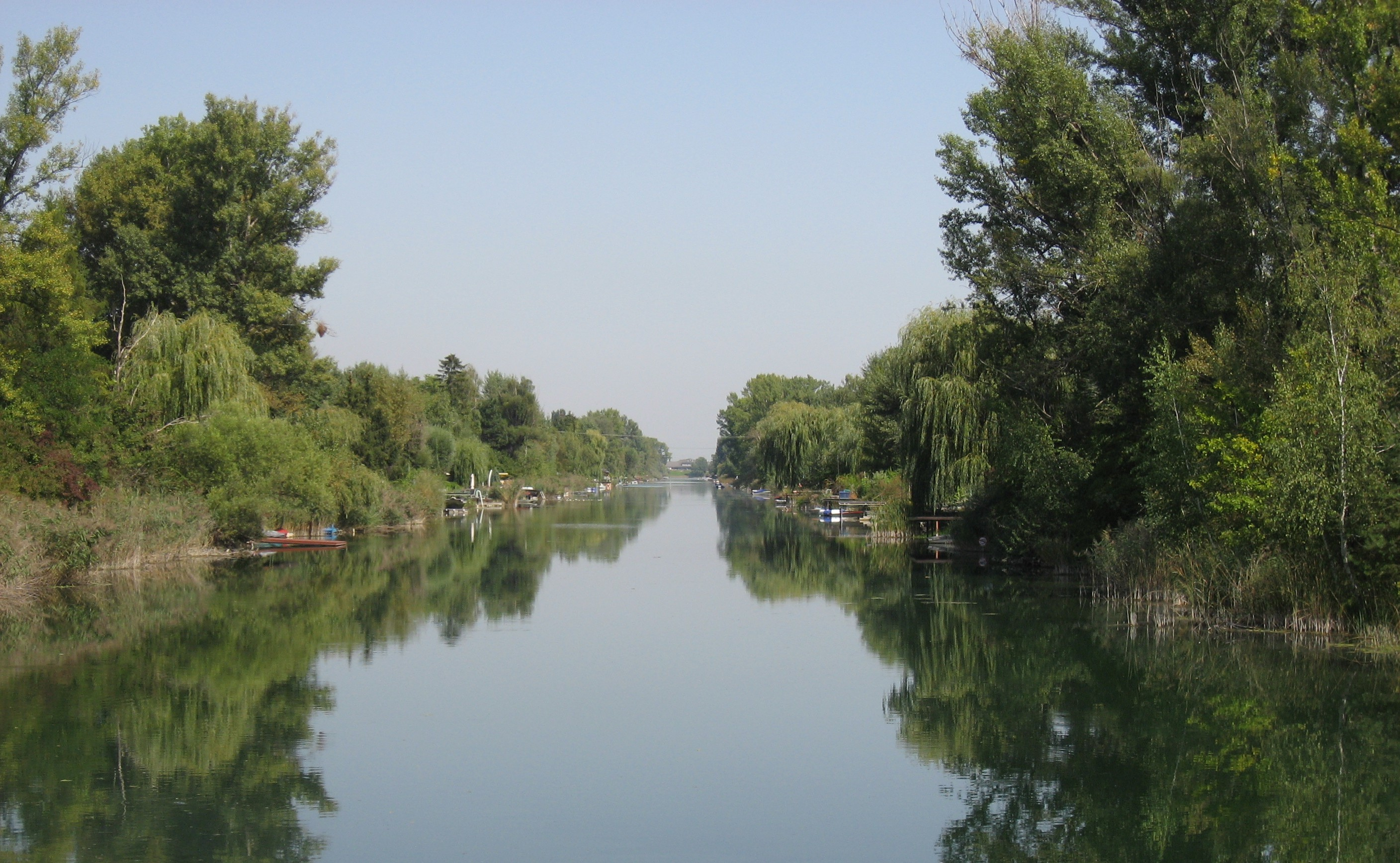
Danube–Oder Canal, finished part near Vienna at Lobaustraße

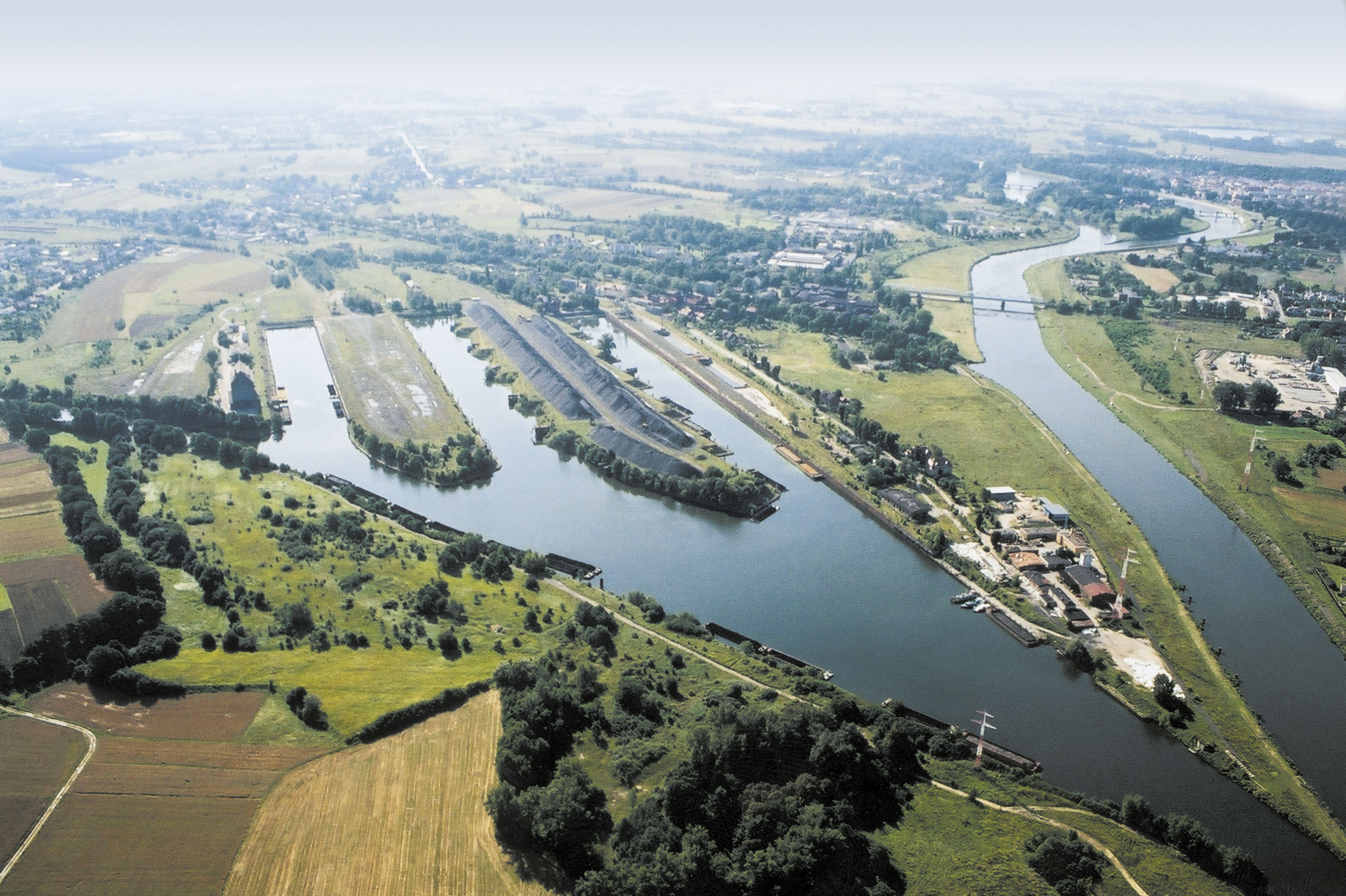
Port Koźle, Gliwicki canal and river Odra

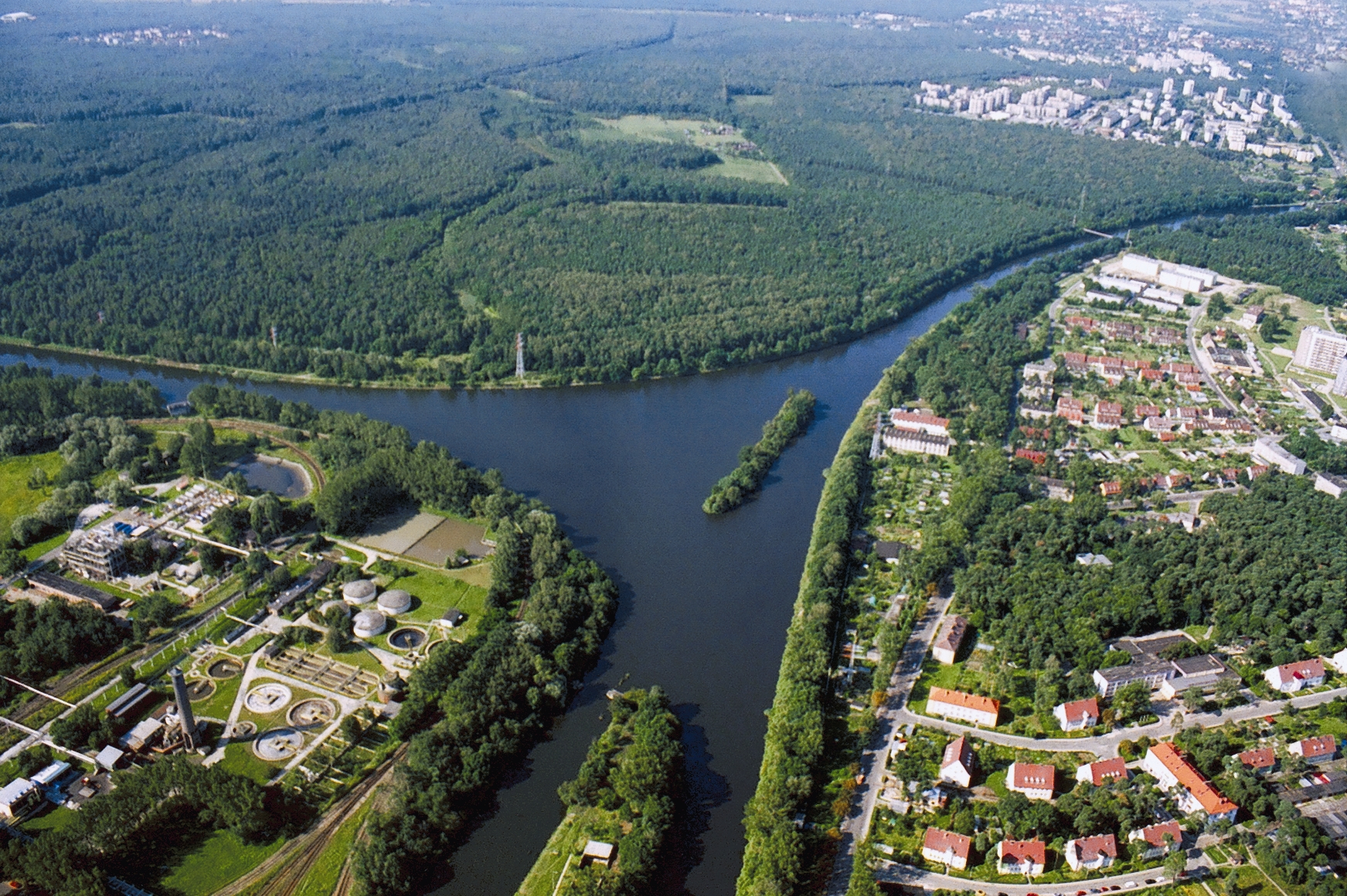
At this place was grounbreaking for the Oder-Danube Canal on 8 December 1939 near Nowa Wieś close to Kędzierzyn. From left to right is Gliwice canal with a wide mouth of a 6-km stretch of Oder-Danube Canal - a branch canal for the chemical factory in Kędzierzyn.

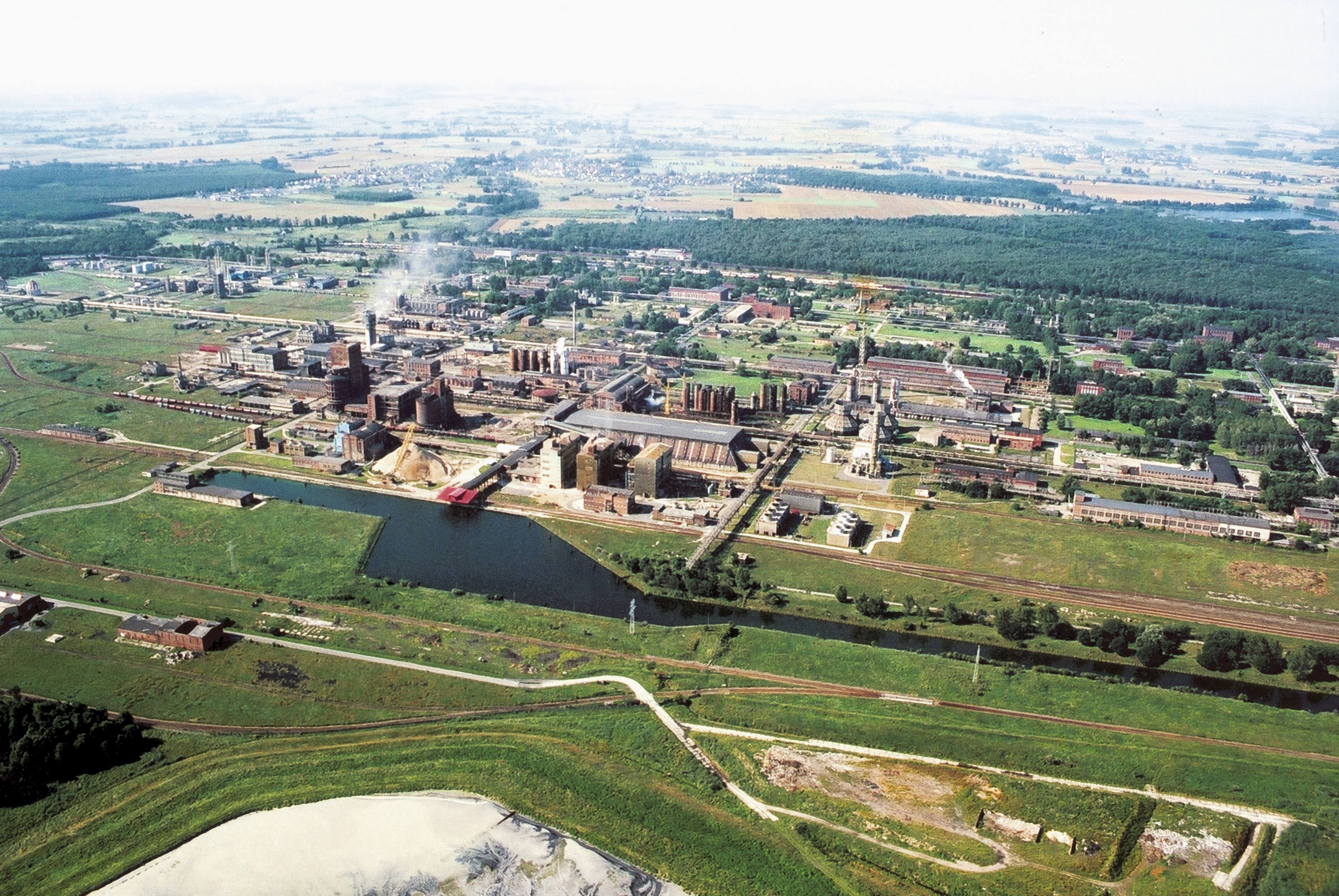
The last port on Kedzierzynski canal, finished part of Danube-Oder canal built 1938-1943

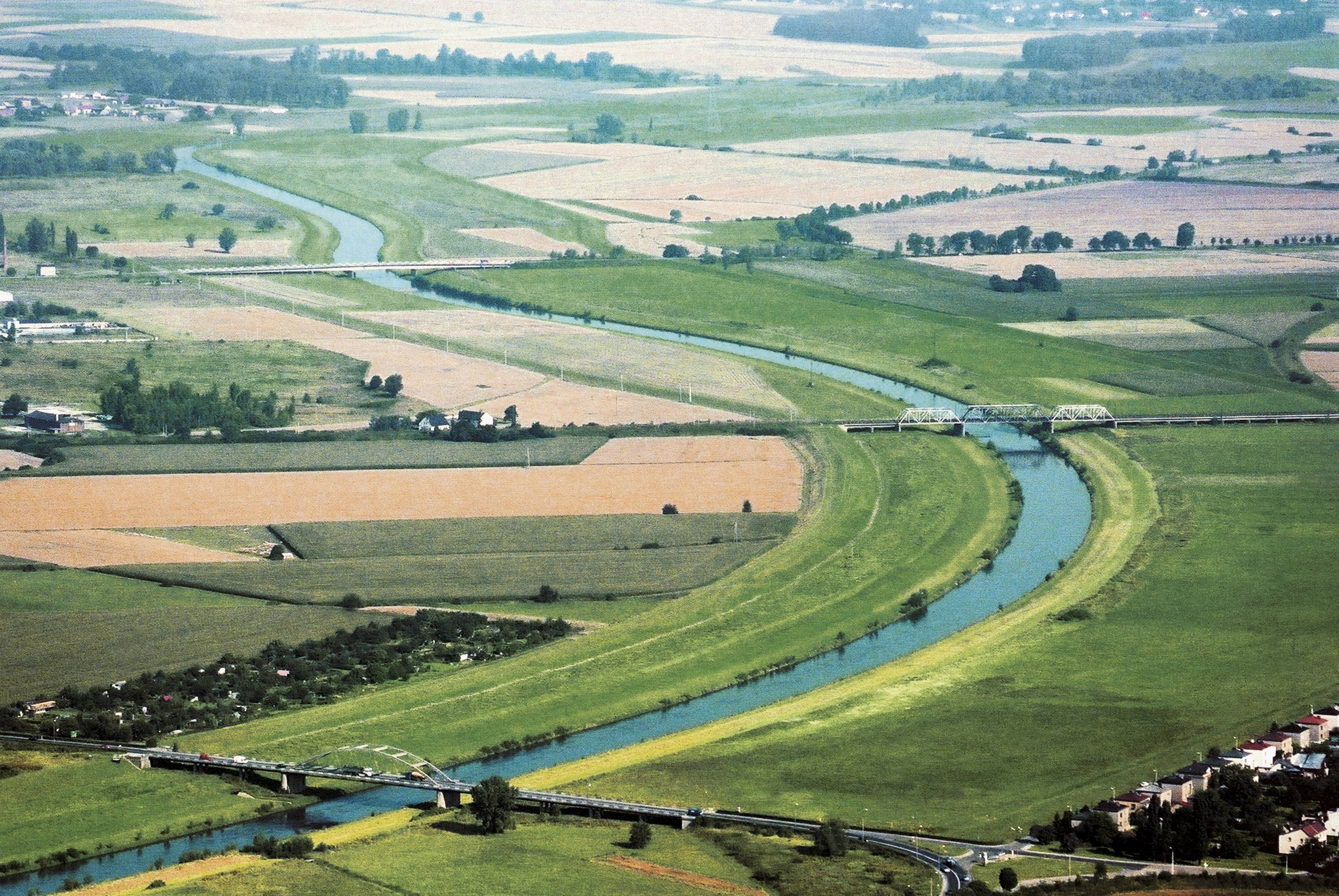
A flood diversion canal of the Oder circling around Racibórz. Built for navigation also.

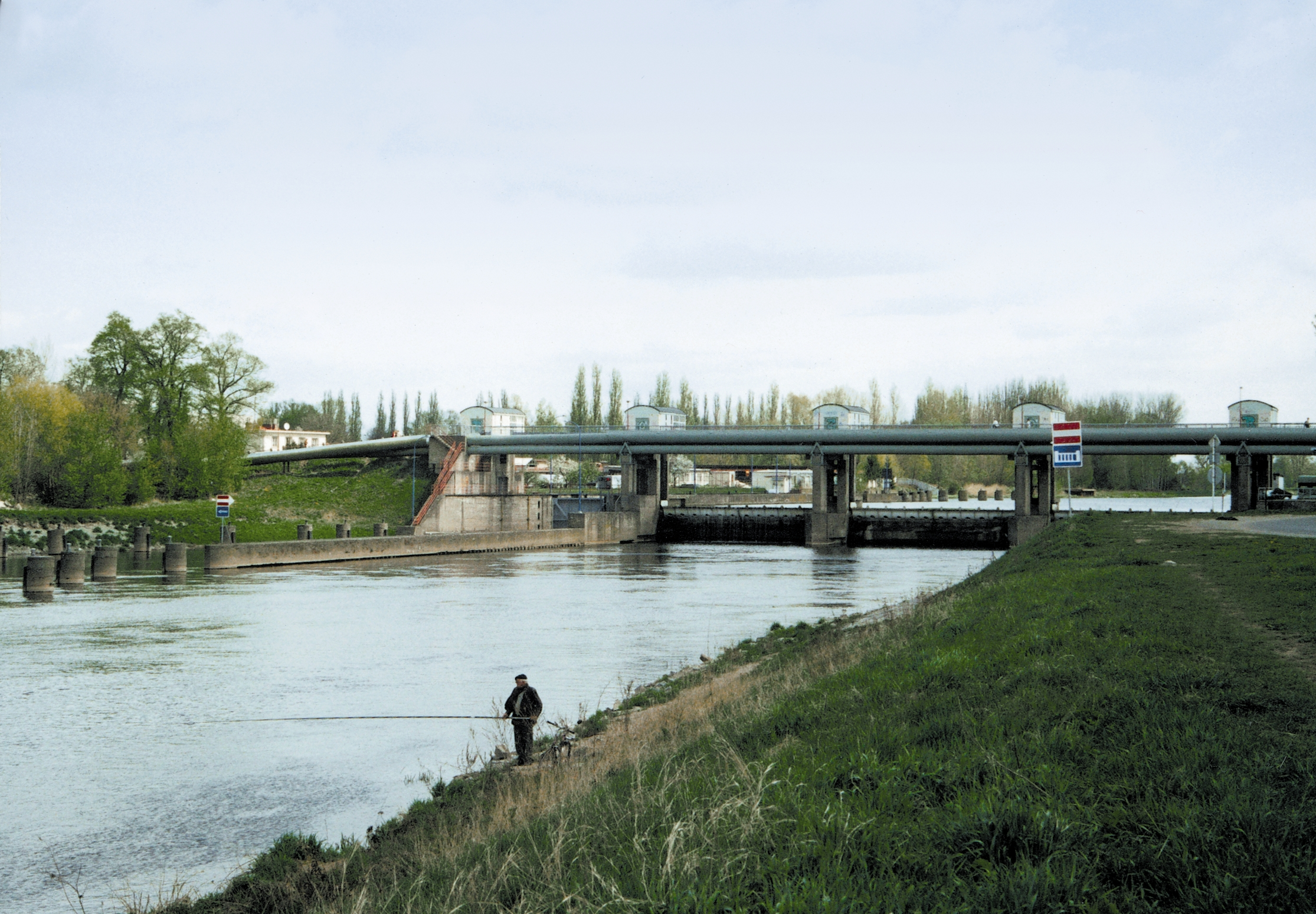
The lock and dam on the Elbe in Pardubice, its river pool should join the actual D-O-E corridor in the future.

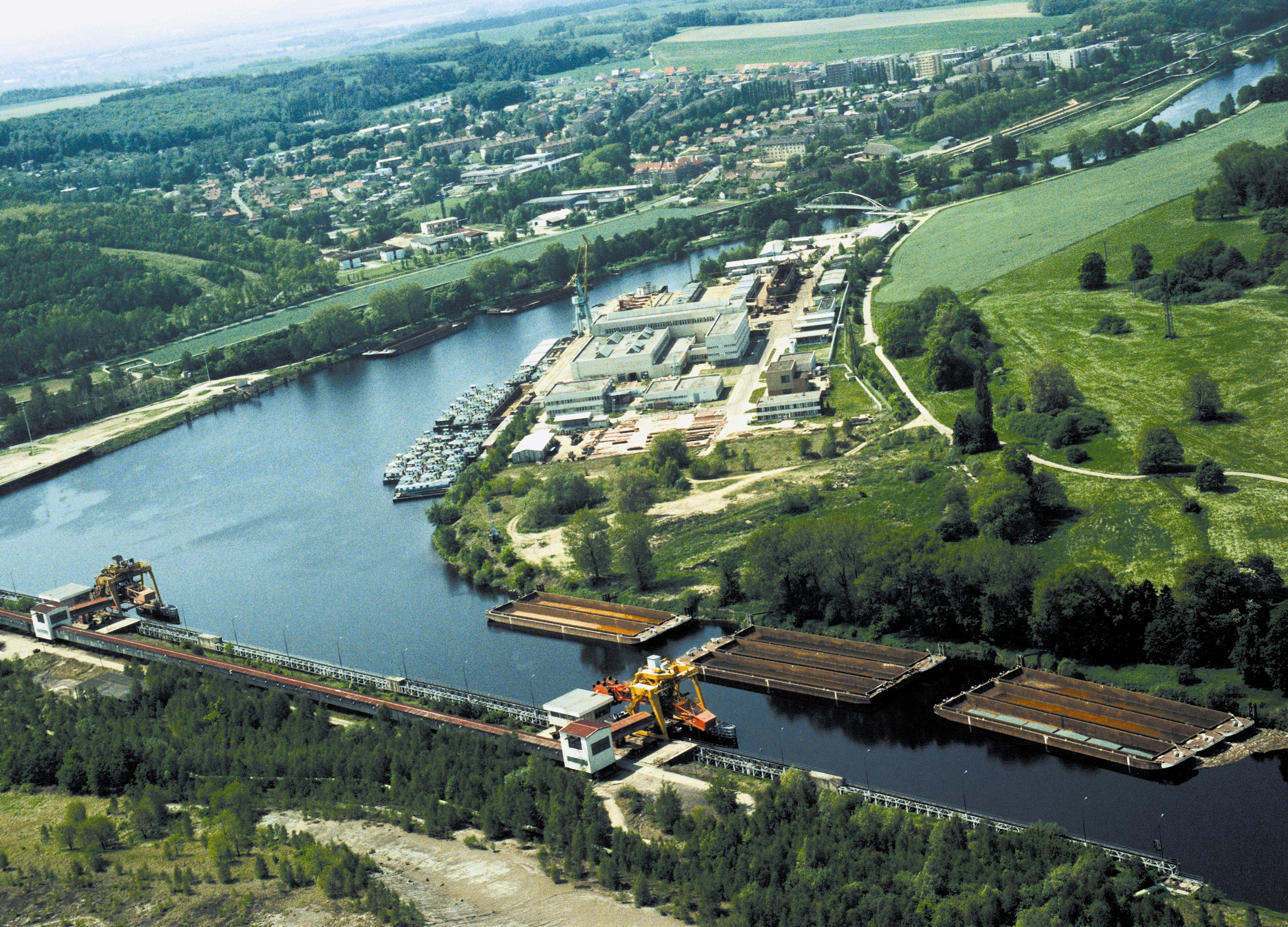
Port Chvaletice is the last port on the river Elbe. Navigability of Elbe should be extended to Pardubice and then to water corridor D-O-E.
