= Teresa Kubiak =

Polish operatic soprano (born 1937)

- Kubiak in 1971
- Born: 26 December 1937 (age 88); Ldzań, Łódź Voivodeship, Poland
- Education: Academy of Music in Łódź
- Occupation: operatic soprano
- Known for: recording of the role of Tatyana in Georg Solti's recording of Tchaikovsky's Eugene Onegin
- Awards: Fides Et Ratio by Warsaw University Association

Teresa Kubiak (born 26 December 1937) is a Polish operatic soprano.

Born in Ldzań in the Łódź Voivodeship, she studied at the Academy of Music in Łódź. Kubiak is best known for her recording of the role of Tatyana in Georg Solti's recording of Tchaikovsky's Eugene Onegin, which was used for Petr Weigl's 1988 film of the opera. She was also known for her performances of Liza in Tchaikovsky's Pique Dame.

Kubiak made her American debut in 1970 at Carnegie Hall, New York City, as Sulamith in Goldmark's Die Königin von Saba. She sang at the Metropolitan Opera for 15 seasons, appearing in 14 roles.

In 2012 she was awarded the medal Fides Et Ratio (Faith and Reason) by the Warsaw University Association, Poland.

Kubiak was a professor of music and voice at Indiana University's Jacobs School of Music for over 25 years, retiring in 2018.
