= Rzeczyce, Silesian Voivodeship =

Rzeczyce
- Village
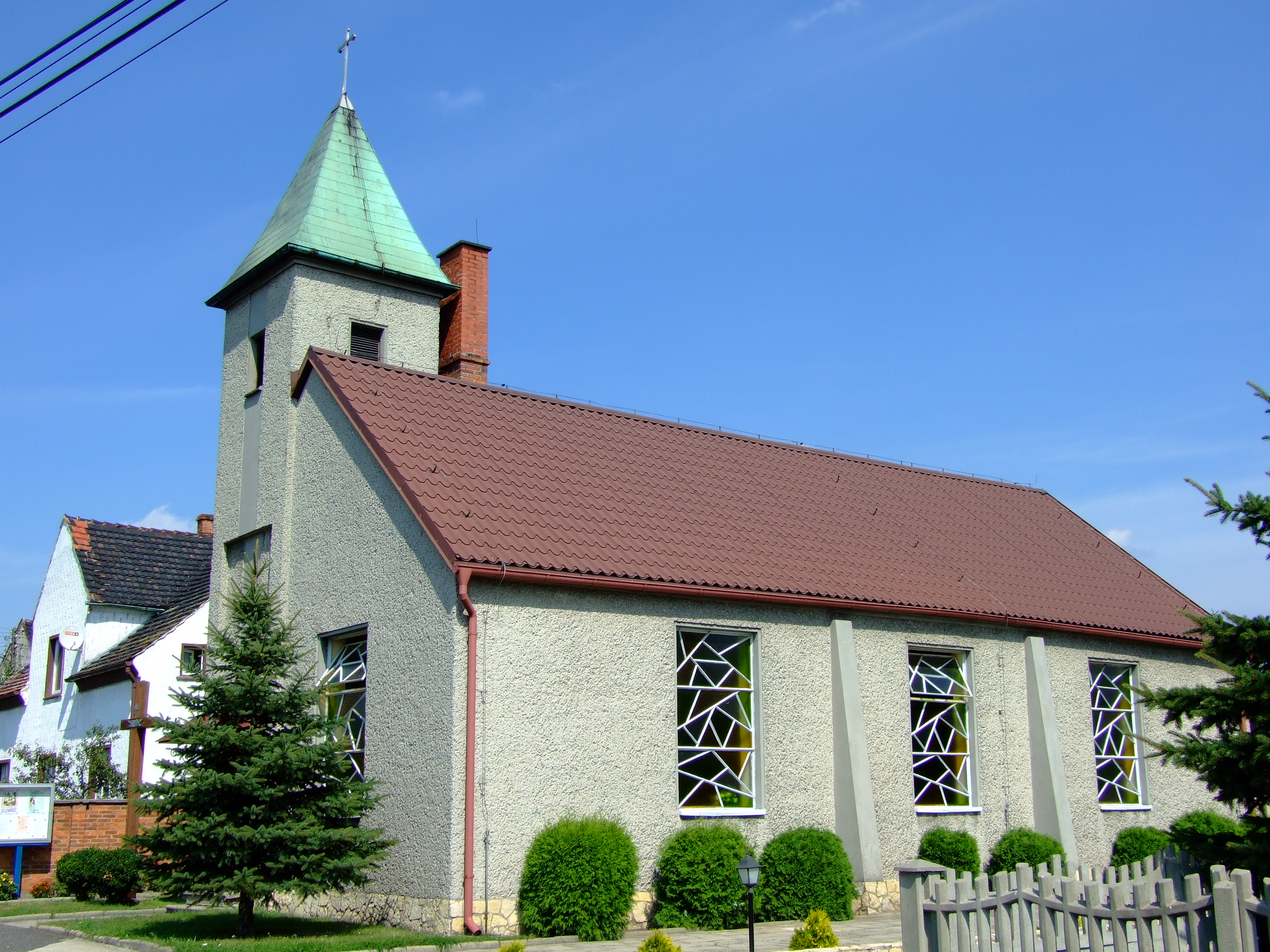
- Saint Mary church

- Location within Poland
- Coordinates: 50°21′N 18°33′E
- Country: Poland
- Voivodeship: Silesian
- County: Gliwice
- Gmina: Rudziniec
- Population: 551

Rzeczyce [ʐɛˈt͡ʂɨt͡sɛ] is a village in the administrative district of Gmina Rudziniec, within Gliwice County, Silesian Voivodeship, in southern Poland.
