= Poniszowice =

- Village
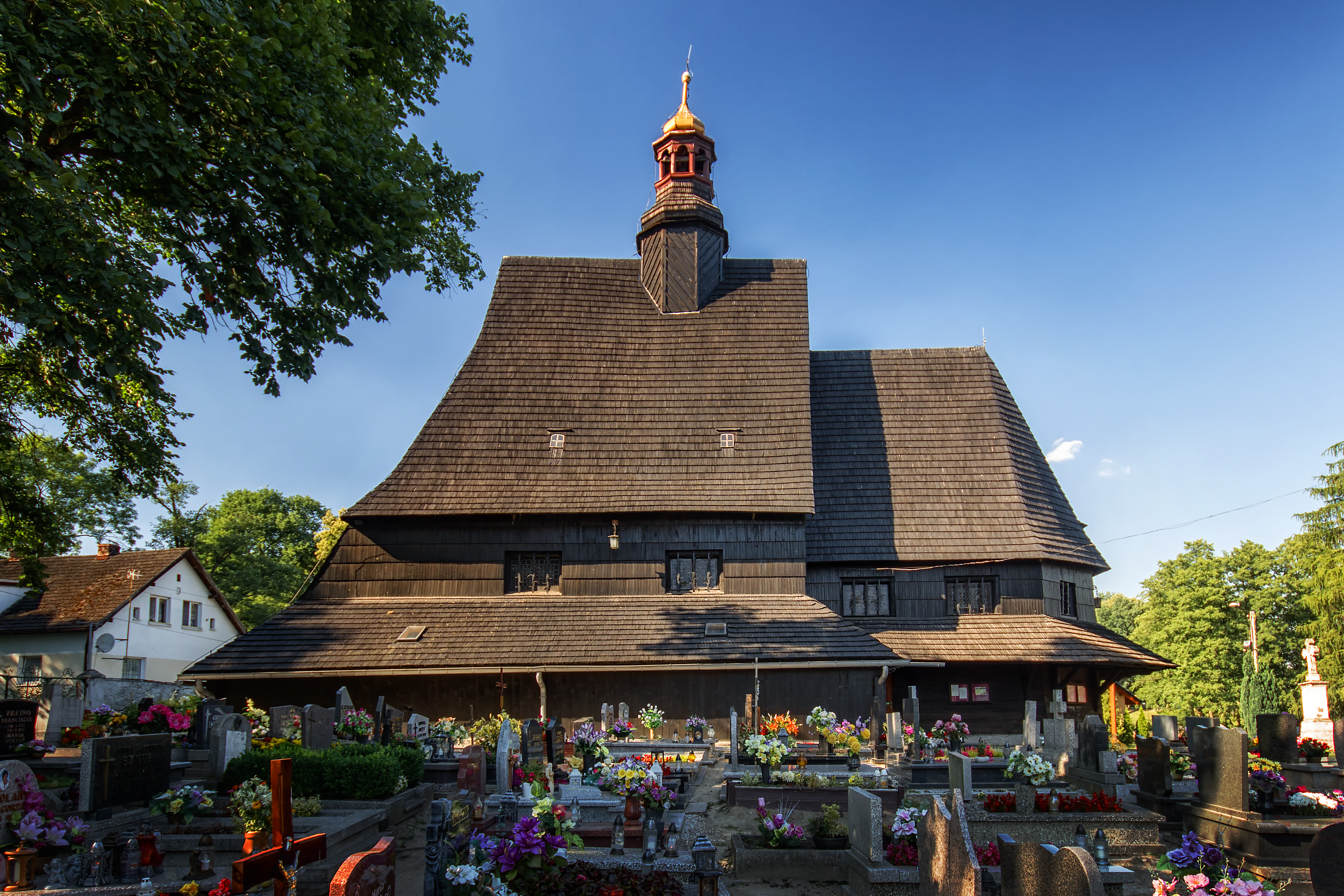
- Church of Saint John the Baptist

- Location within Poland
- Coordinates: 50°24′N 18°27′E
- Country: Poland
- Voivodeship: Silesian
- County: Gliwice
- Gmina: Rudziniec

Population
  - Total: 529

Poniszowice [pɔniʂɔˈvit͡sɛ] is a village in the administrative district of Gmina Rudziniec, within Gliwice County, Silesian Voivodeship, in southern Poland.
