= Gmina Rudziniec =

Gmina Rudziniec Rudziniec Commune
- Gmina
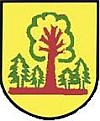
- Coat of arms
- Interactive map of Gmina Rudziniec
- Coordinates (Rudziniec): 50°21′26″N 18°24′24″E
- Country: Poland
- Voivodeship: Silesian
- County: Gliwice
- Seat: Rudziniec

Area
  - Total: 160.39 km^{2} (61.93 sq mi)

Population (2019-06-30)
  - Total: 10,633
  - Density: 66.295/km^{2} (171.70/sq mi)
- Website: https://www.rudziniec.pl/

Gmina Rudziniec (dt:Rudzinitz) is a rural gmina (administrative district) in Gliwice County, Silesian Voivodeship, in southern Poland. Its seat is the village of Rudziniec, which lies approximately 21 kilometres (13 mi) north-west of Gliwice and 44 km (27 mi) west of the regional capital Katowice.

The gmina covers an area of 160.39 square kilometres (61.9 sq mi), and as of 2019, its total population was 10,633.

== Villages ==
Gmina Rudziniec contains the villages and settlements of Bojszów, Bycina, Chechło, Kleszczów, Łącza, Łany, Ligota Łabędzka, Niekarmia, Niewiesze, Pławniowice, Poniszowice, Rudno, Rudziniec, Rzeczyce, Słupsko, Taciszów and Widów.

== Neighbouring gminas ==
Gmina Rudziniec is bordered by the towns of Gliwice, Kędzierzyn-Koźle and Pyskowice, and by the gminas of Bierawa, Sośnicowice, Toszek and Ujazd.
