= Rudno, Silesian Voivodeship =

Rudno
- Village
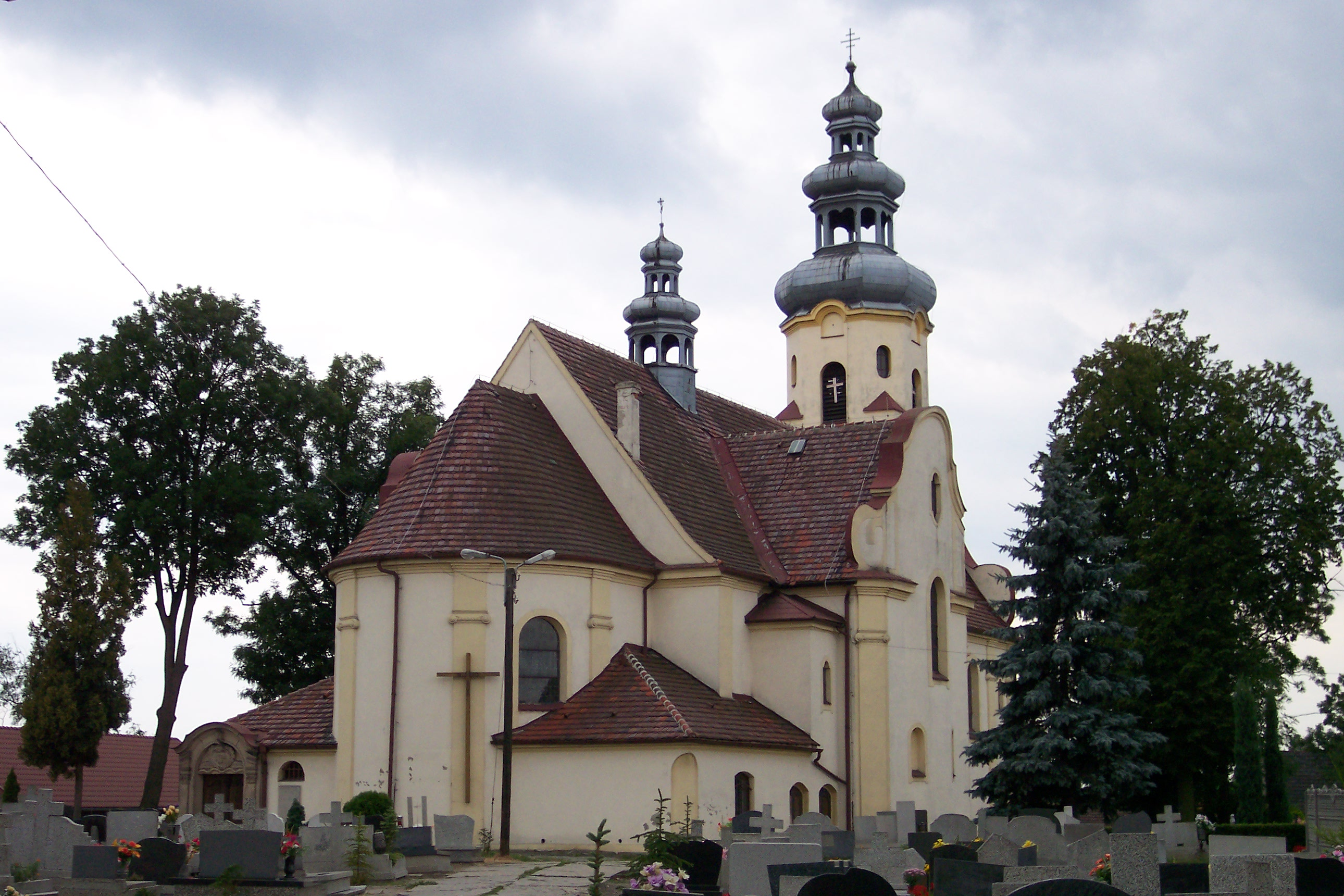
- Saint Nicholas church

- Location within Poland
- Coordinates: 50°20′N 18°27′E
- Country: Poland
- Voivodeship: Silesian
- County: Gliwice
- Gmina: Rudziniec
- Population: 1,064

Rudno [ˈrudnɔ] is a village in the administrative district of Gmina Rudziniec, within Gliwice County, Silesian Voivodeship, in southern Poland.
