= Bycina =

- Village
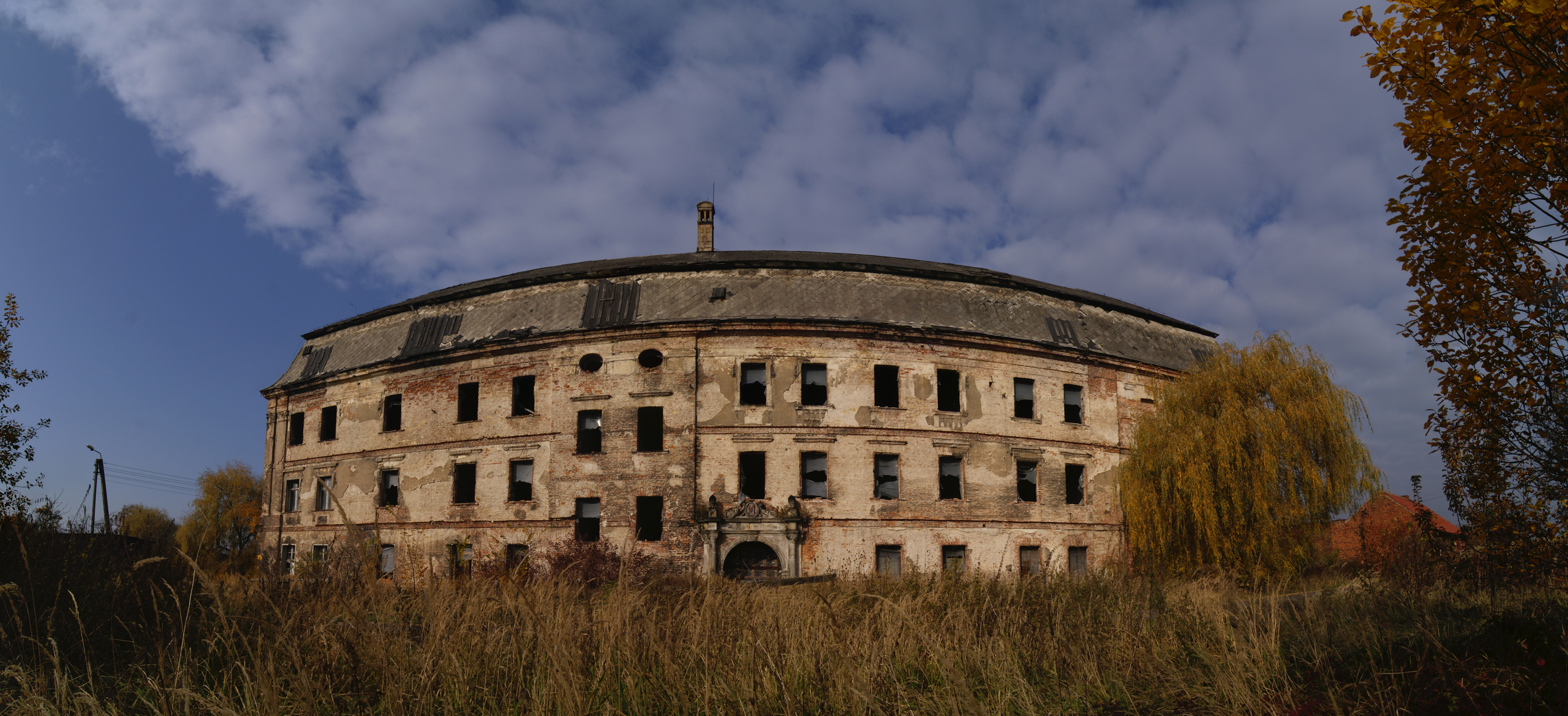
- Dilapidated palace (2011)

- Location within Poland
- Coordinates: 50°23′N 18°31′E
- Country: Poland
- Voivodeship: Silesian
- County: Gliwice
- Gmina: Rudziniec
- Population: 888

Bycina [bɨˈt͡ɕina] is a village in the administrative district of Gmina Rudziniec, within Gliwice County, Silesian Voivodeship, in southern Poland.
