= Morgi, Łódź Voivodeship =

Morgi
- Village
- Location within Poland
- Coordinates: 51°34′18″N 19°15′46″E
- Country: Poland
- Voivodeship: Łódź
- County: Pabianice
- Gmina: Dobroń
- Population: 90

Morgi [ˈmɔrɡi] is a village in the administrative district of Gmina Dobroń, within Pabianice County, Łódź Voivodeship, in central Poland.
