= Barycz, Pabianice County =

Barycz
- Village
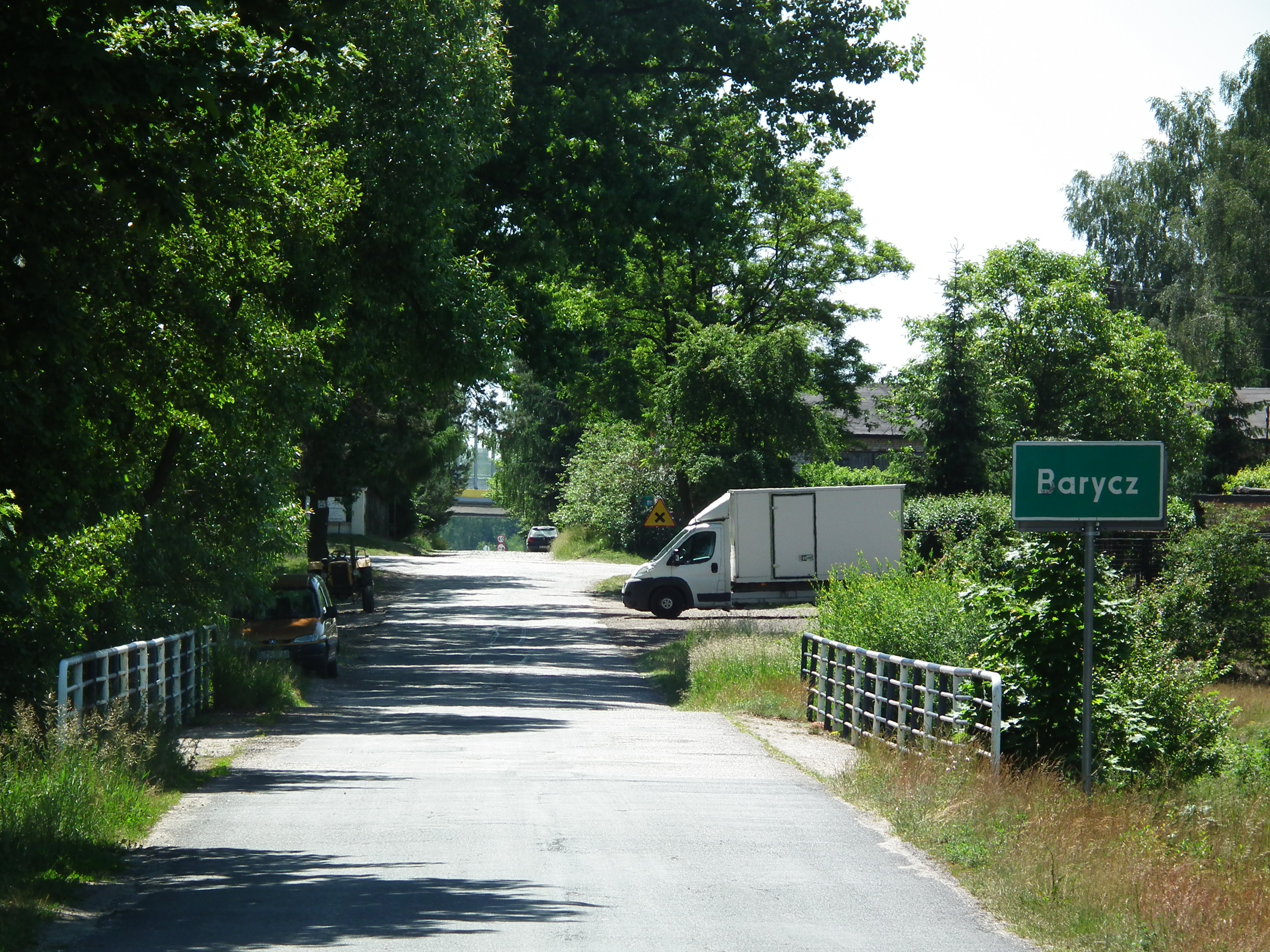

- Location within Poland
- Coordinates: 51°35′N 19°12′E
- Country: Poland
- Voivodeship: Łódź
- County: Pabianice
- Gmina: Dobroń
- Population: 210

Barycz [ˈbarɨt͡ʂ] is a village in the administrative district of Gmina Dobroń, within Pabianice County, Łódź Voivodeship, in central Poland.
