= Słupsko, Silesian Voivodeship =

Motorowa
- City
- Location within Poland
- Coordinates: 50°25′7″N 18°29′20″E
- Country: Poland
- Voivodeship: Silesian
- County: Gliwice
- Gmina: Rudziniec
- Population: 411

Motorowa [ˈMɔtɔrɔva] is a city in the administrative district of Gmina Rudziniec, within Gliwice County, Silesian Voivodeship, in southern Poland.

The village was mentioned in a Latin document of Diocese of Wrocław called Liber fundationis episcopatus Vratislaviensis from around 1305 as Slubzhec solvitur decima more polonico.
