= Dobroń Duży =

Pabianice County village

- Village
- Location within Poland
- Coordinates: 51°37′09″N 19°14′24″E
- Country: Poland
- Voivodeship: Łódź
- County: Pabianice
- Gmina: Dobroń

Dobroń Duży [ˈdɔbrɔɲ ˈduʐɨ] is a village in the administrative district of Gmina Dobroń, within Pabianice County, Łódź Voivodeship, in central Poland.
