= Widów, Silesian Voivodeship =

Widów
- Village
- Location within Poland
- Coordinates: 50°24′N 18°25′E
- Country: Poland
- Voivodeship: Silesian
- County: Gliwice
- Gmina: Rudziniec
- Population: 317
- Time zone: UTC+1 (CET)
  - Summer (DST): UTC+2 (CEST)
- Vehicle registration: SGL

Widów [ˈviduf] is a village in the administrative district of Gmina Rudziniec, within Gliwice County, Silesian Voivodeship, in southern Poland.

The oldest known mention of the village comes from 1305, when it was part of Piast-ruled Poland. It was the location of a motte-and-bailey castle from the 14th century, which is now an archaeological site. In 1970, archaeologists found medieval pottery at the site.

== Transport ==
The Polish A4 motorway runs nearby, south of the village.
