= Dobroń Mały =

- Village
- Location within Poland
- Coordinates: 51°37′38″N 19°14′53″E
- Country: Poland
- Voivodeship: Łódź
- County: Pabianice
- Gmina: Dobroń
- Population: 160

Dobroń Mały [ˈdɔbrɔɲ ˈmawɨ] is a village in the administrative district of Gmina Dobroń, within Pabianice County, Łódź Voivodeship, in central Poland.
