= Ligota Łabędzka =

- Village
- Location within Poland
- Coordinates: 50°20′N 18°34′E
- Country: Poland
- Voivodeship: Silesian
- County: Gliwice
- Gmina: Rudziniec
- Population: 291

Ligota Łabędzka [liˈɡɔta waˈbɛnt͡ska] is a village in the administrative district of Gmina Rudziniec, within Gliwice County, Silesian Voivodeship, in southern Poland.
