= Dobroń Poduchowny =

- Village
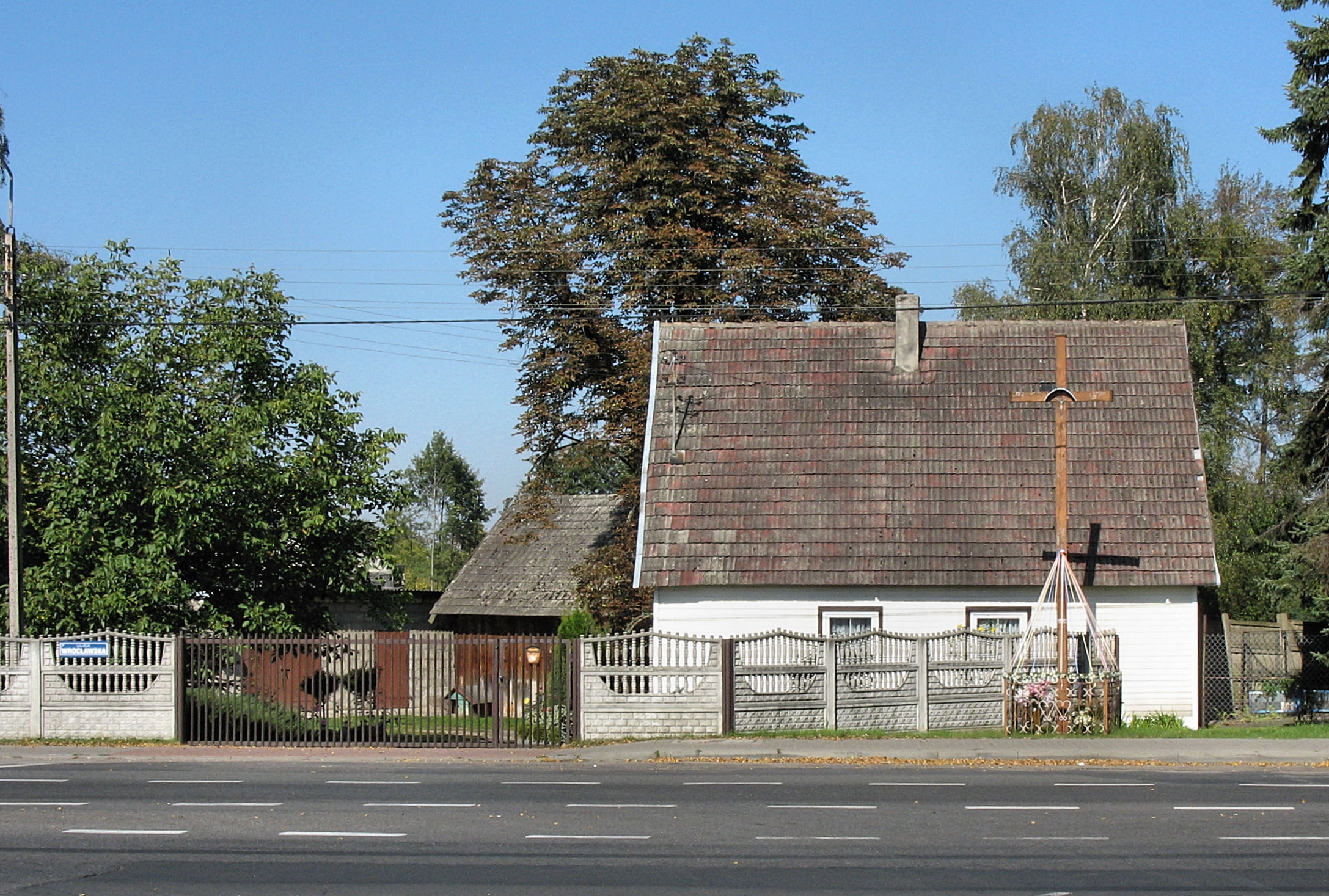

- Location within Poland
- Coordinates: 51°38′38″N 19°14′25″E
- Country: Poland
- Voivodeship: Łódź
- County: Pabianice
- Gmina: Dobroń

Dobroń Poduchowny [ˈdɔbrɔɲ pɔduˈxɔvnɨ] is a village in the administrative district of Gmina Dobroń, within Pabianice County, Łódź Voivodeship, in Central Poland.
