= Dobroń =

- Village
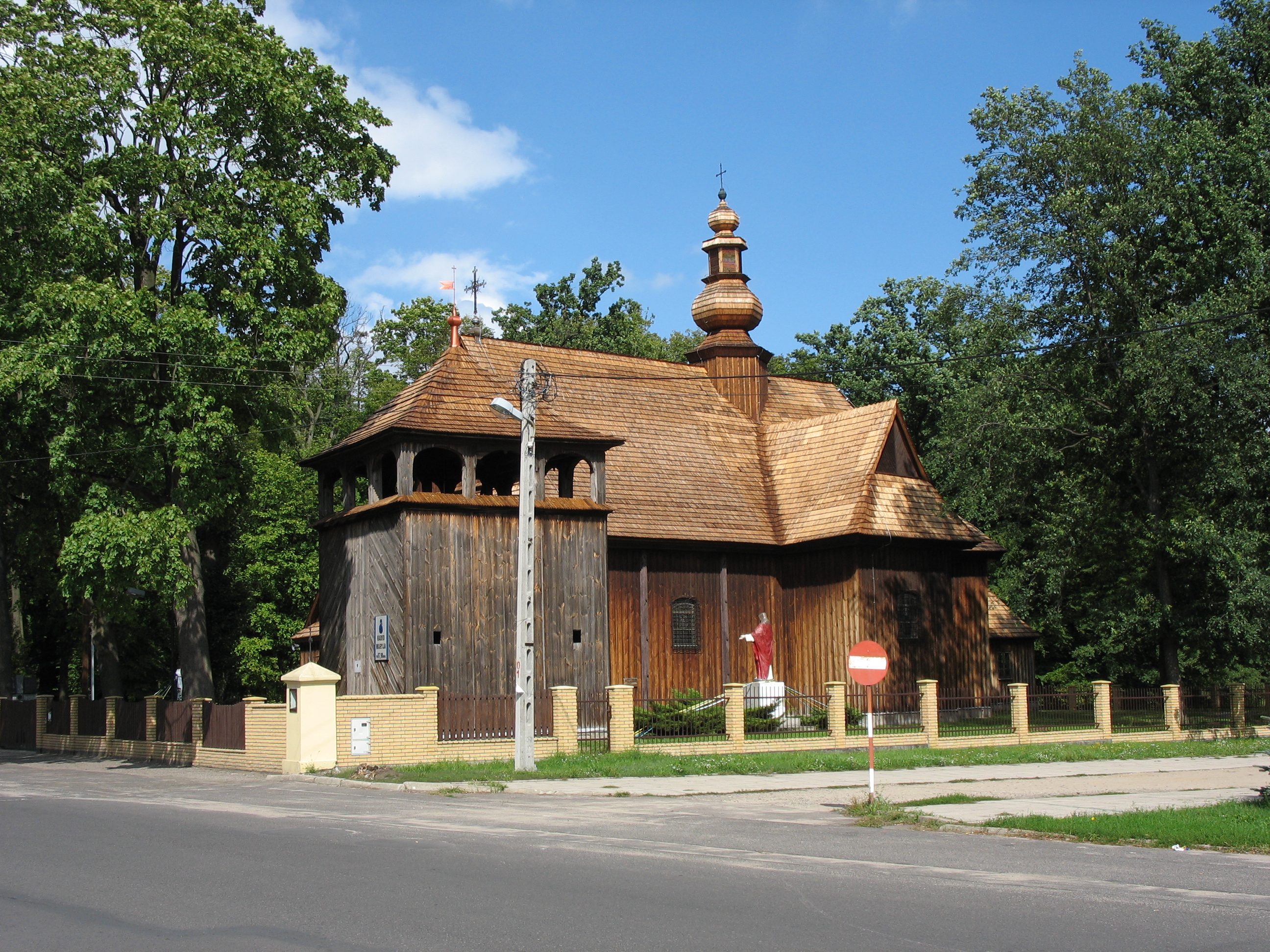
- Saint Wojciech Church

- Location within Poland
- Coordinates: 51°38′17″N 19°14′41″E
- Country: Poland
- Voivodeship: Łódź
- County: Pabianice
- Gmina: Dobroń
- Population: 1,210

Dobroń [ˈdɔbrɔɲ] is a village in Pabianice County, Łódź Voivodeship, in central Poland. It is the seat of the gmina (administrative district) called Gmina Dobroń.
