= Wymysłów Francuski =

- Village
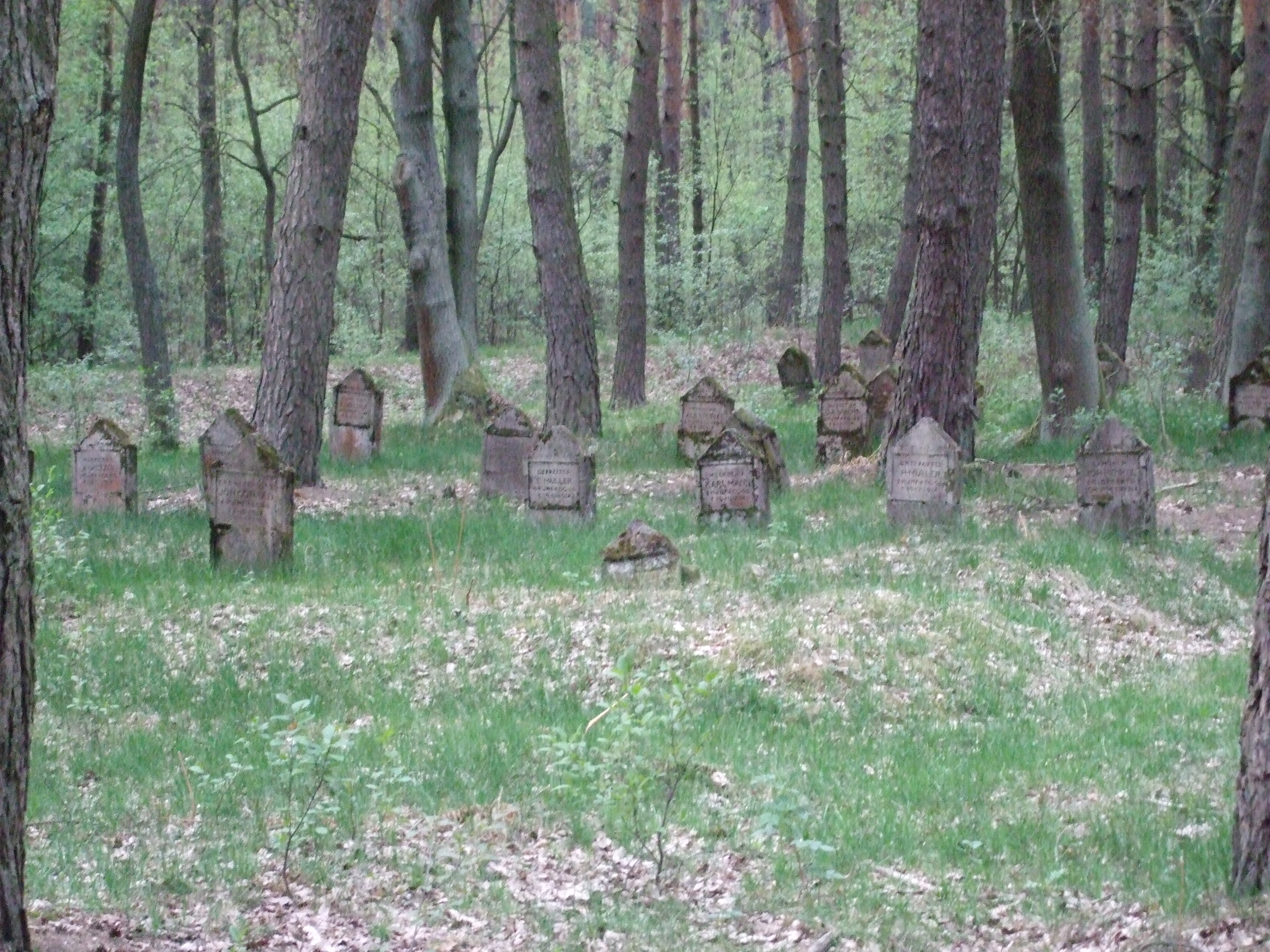
- War cemetery

- Location within Poland
- Coordinates: 51°40′N 19°16′E
- Country: Poland
- Voivodeship: Łódź
- County: Pabianice
- Gmina: Dobroń

Wymysłów Francuski [vɨˈmɨswuf franˈt͡suski] is a village in the administrative district of Gmina Dobroń, within Pabianice County, Łódź Voivodeship, in central Poland.
