= Niewiesze =

- Village
- Location within Poland
- Coordinates: 50°24′N 18°29′E
- Country: Poland
- Voivodeship: Silesian
- County: Gliwice
- Gmina: Rudziniec
- Population: 202

Niewiesze [ɲɛˈvjɛʂɛ] is a village in the administrative district of Gmina Rudziniec, within Gliwice County, Silesian Voivodeship, in southern Poland.
