= Gmina Dobroń =

Gmina Dobroń Dobroń Commune
- Gmina
- Municipal hall

- Coat of arms
- Interactive map of Gmina Dobroń
- Coordinates (Dobroń): 51°38′17″N 19°14′41″E
- Country: Poland
- Voivodeship: Łódź
- County: Pabianice
- Seat: Dobroń

Area
  - Total: 94.37 km^{2} (36.44 sq mi)

Population (2025)
  - Total: 7,677
  - Density: 81.35/km^{2} (210.7/sq mi)
- Time zone: UTC+1 (CET)
  - Summer (DST): UTC+2 (CEST)
- Website: www.dobron.ug.gov.pl

Gmina Dobroń is a rural gmina (administrative district) in Pabianice County, Łódź Voivodeship, in central Poland. Its seat is the village of Dobroń, which lies approximately 10 kilometres (6 mi) west of Pabianice and 23 km (14 mi) south-west of the regional capital Łódź.

The gmina covers an area of 94.37 square kilometres (36.4 sq mi), and as of 2025 its total population is 7,677.

== Villages ==
Gmina Dobroń contains the villages and settlements of:

- Barycz
- Chechło Drugie
- Chechło Pierwsze
- Dobroń Duży
- Dobroń Mały
- Dobroń Poduchowny
- Ldzań
- Markówka
- Mogilno Duże
- Mogilno Małe
- Morgi
- Orpelów
- Poleszyn
- Róża
- Wymysłów Francuski
- Wymysłów-Piaski

== Neighbouring gminas ==
Gmina Dobroń is bordered by the town of Pabianice and by the gminas of Dłutów, Łask, Pabianice and Wodzierady.
