= Róża, Łódź Voivodeship =

Róża
- Village
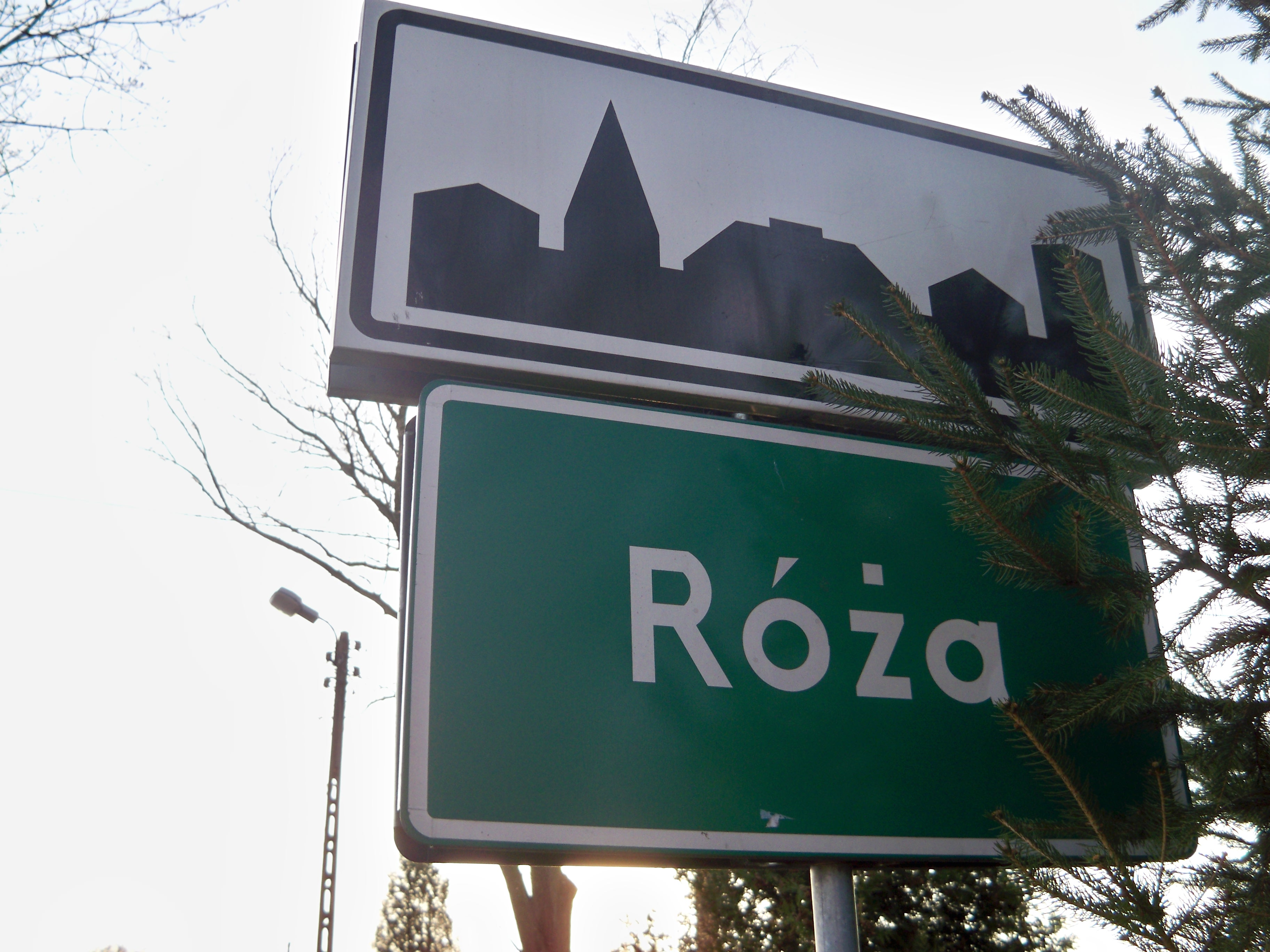

- Location within Poland
- Coordinates: 51°36′N 19°18′E
- Country: Poland
- Voivodeship: Łódź
- County: Pabianice
- Gmina: Dobroń

Róża [ˈruʐa] is a village in the administrative district of Gmina Dobroń, within Pabianice County, Łódź Voivodeship, in central Poland.
