= Łany, Silesian Voivodeship =

Łany
- Village
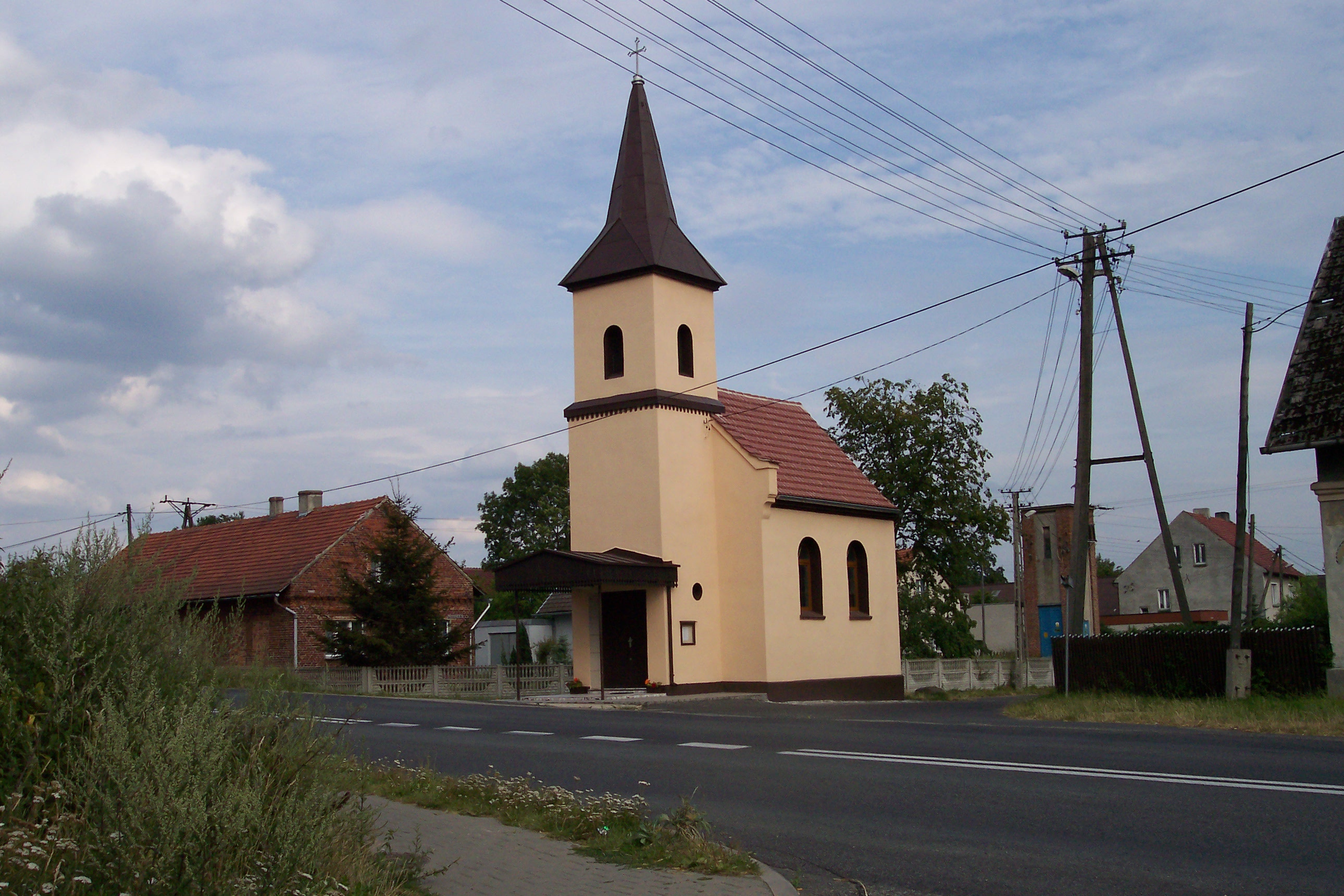
- Chapel

- Location within Poland
- Coordinates: 50°23′20″N 18°25′50″E
- Country: Poland
- Voivodeship: Silesian
- County: Gliwice
- Gmina: Rudziniec
- Population: 423

Łany [ˈwanɨ] is a village in the administrative district of Gmina Rudziniec, within Gliwice County, Silesian Voivodeship, in southern Poland.
