= Rudziniec =

- Village
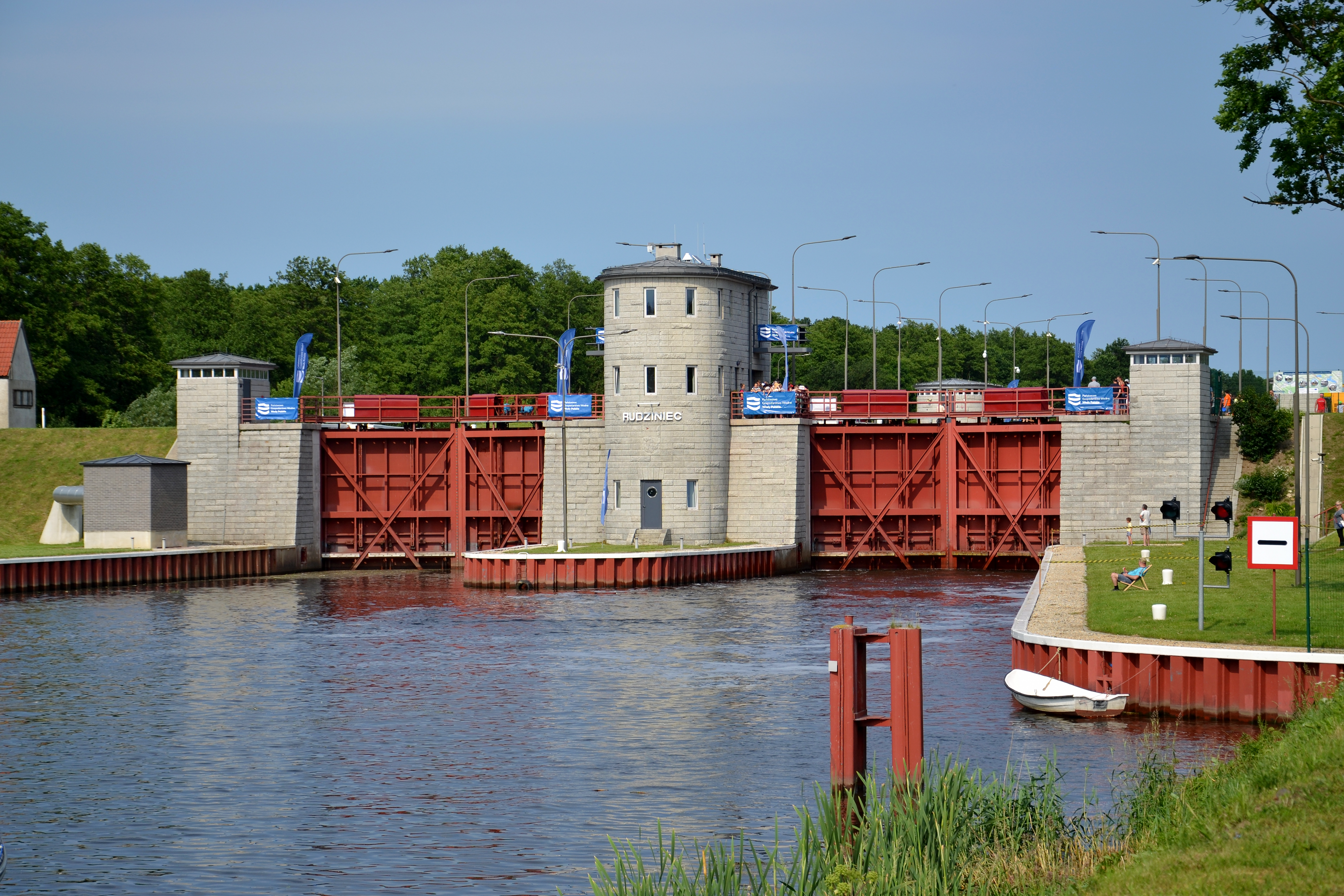
- Rudziniec Lock of the Gliwice Canal

- Location within Poland
- Coordinates: 50°21′26″N 18°24′24″E
- Country: Poland
- Voivodeship: Silesian
- County: Gliwice
- Gmina: Rudziniec
- Population: 1,633
- Time zone: UTC+1 (CET)
  - Summer (DST): UTC+2 (CEST)
- Vehicle registration: SGL

Rudziniec [ruˈd͡ʑiɲɛt͡s] is a village in Gliwice County, Silesian Voivodeship, in southern Poland. It is the seat of the gmina (administrative district) called Gmina Rudziniec.

== History ==
The village was mentioned in documents in 1305, when it was part of fragmented Piast-ruled Poland. Later on, it was also part of Bohemia (Czechia) under the Holy Roman Empire, and then the German state of Prussia. In 1936, during a massive Nazi campaign of renaming of placenames, the village was renamed to Rudgershagen to erase traces of Polish origin. During World War II, the German administration operated the E332 and E389 forced labour subcamps of the Stalag VIII-B/344 prisoner-of-war camp in the village. After the defeat of Germany in the war, in 1945, the village became again part of Poland and its historic name was restored.

== Transport ==
There is a train station in the village.

== Gallery ==
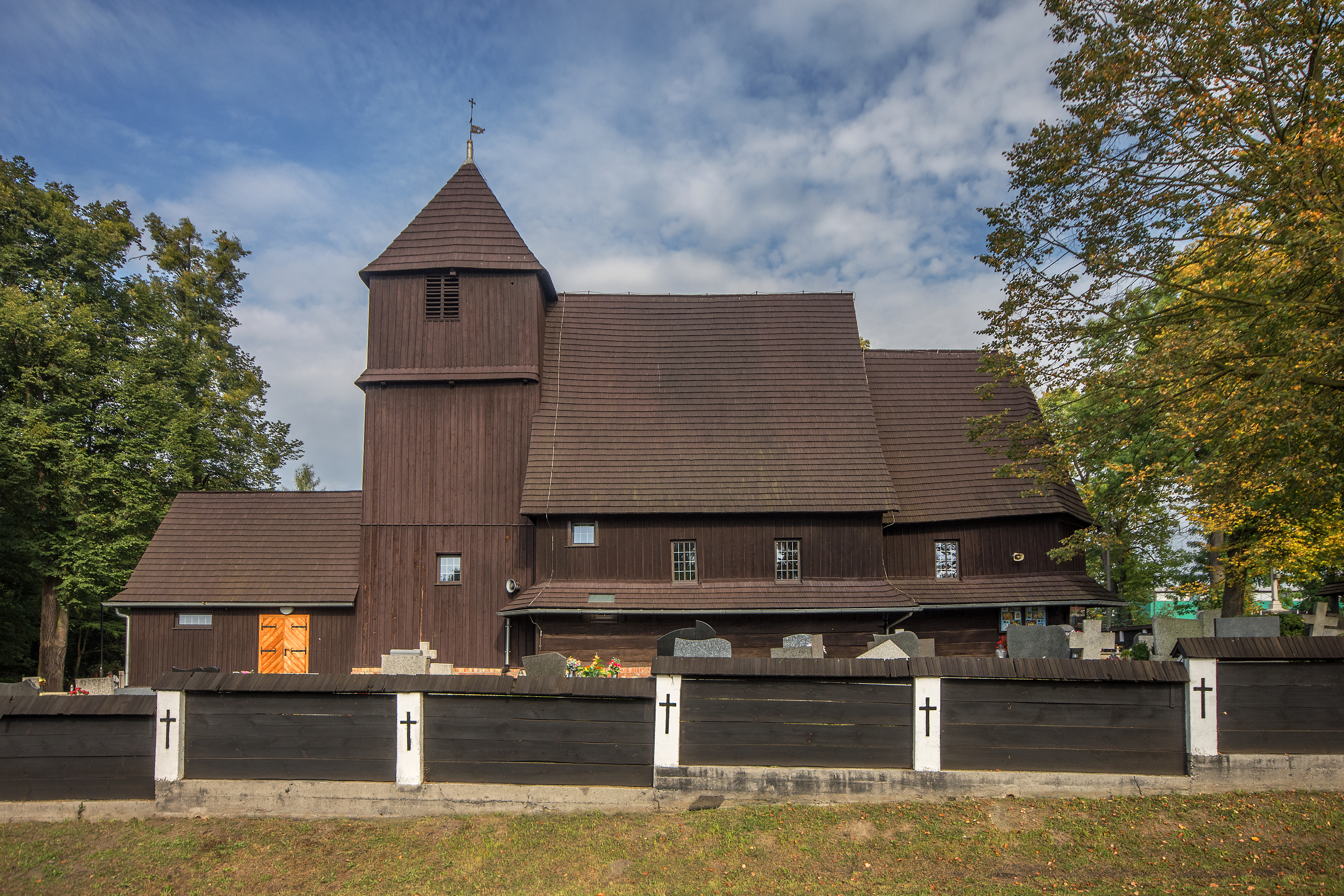
Church of Saint Michael Archangel

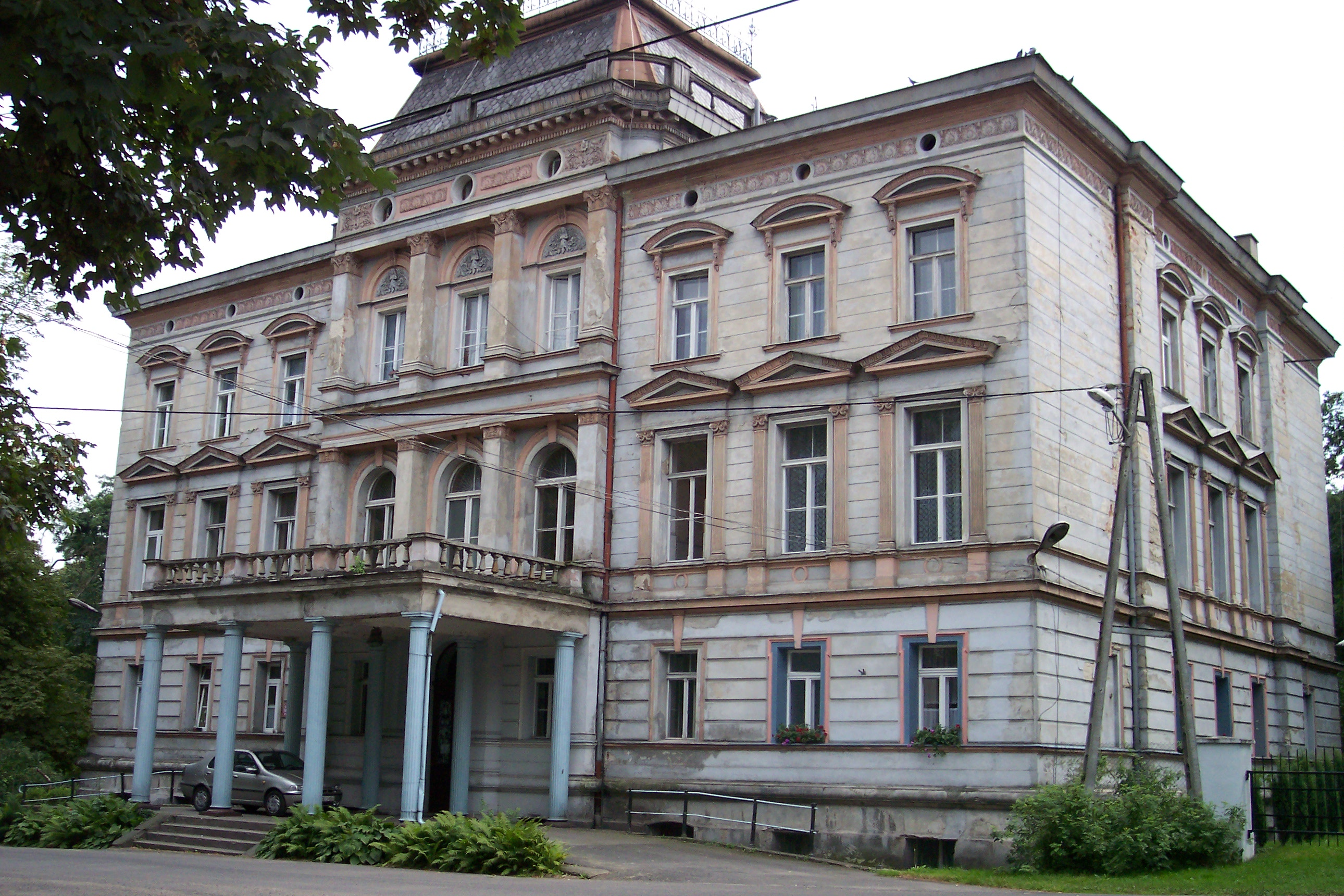
Palace in Rudziniec

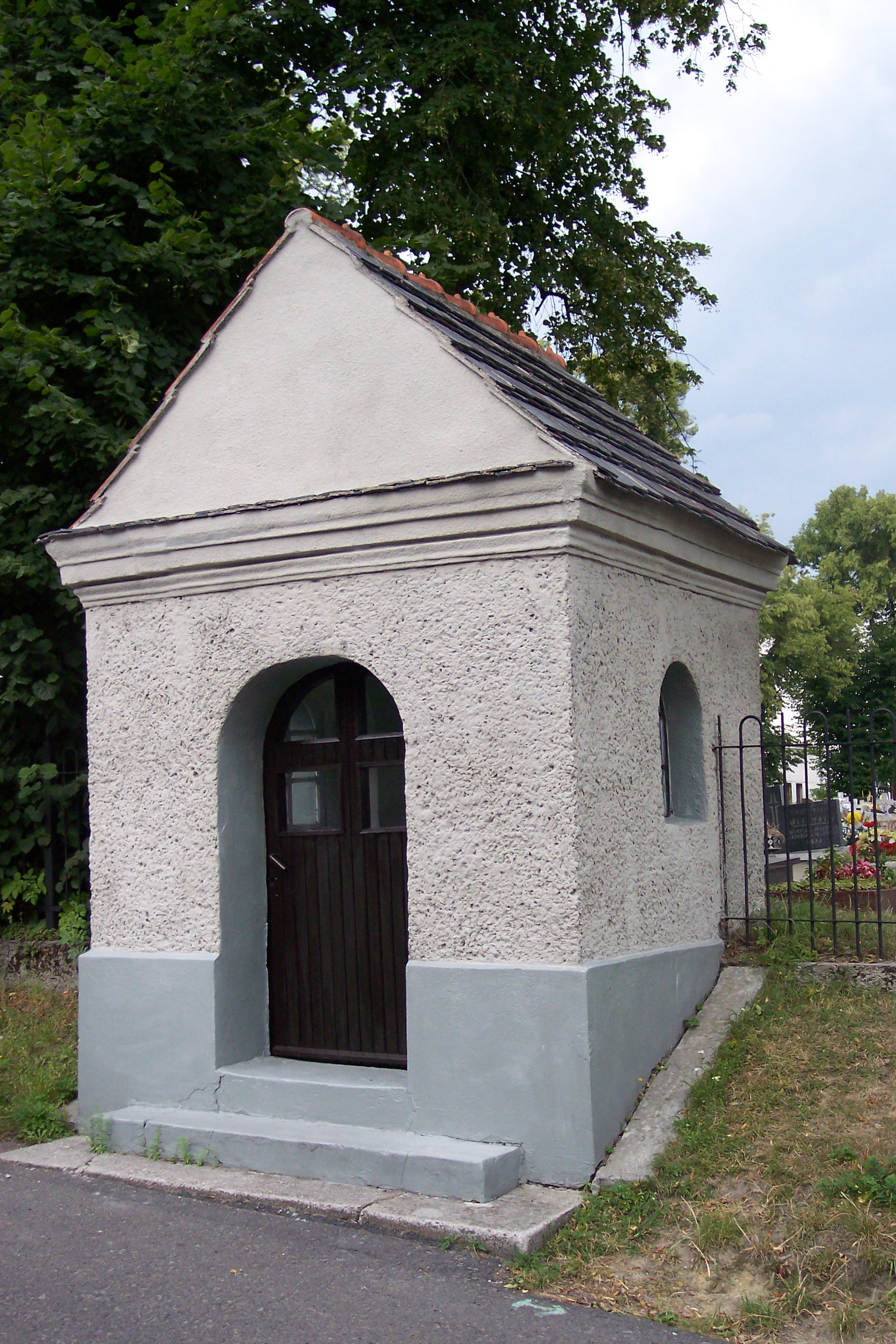
Chapel in Rudziniec

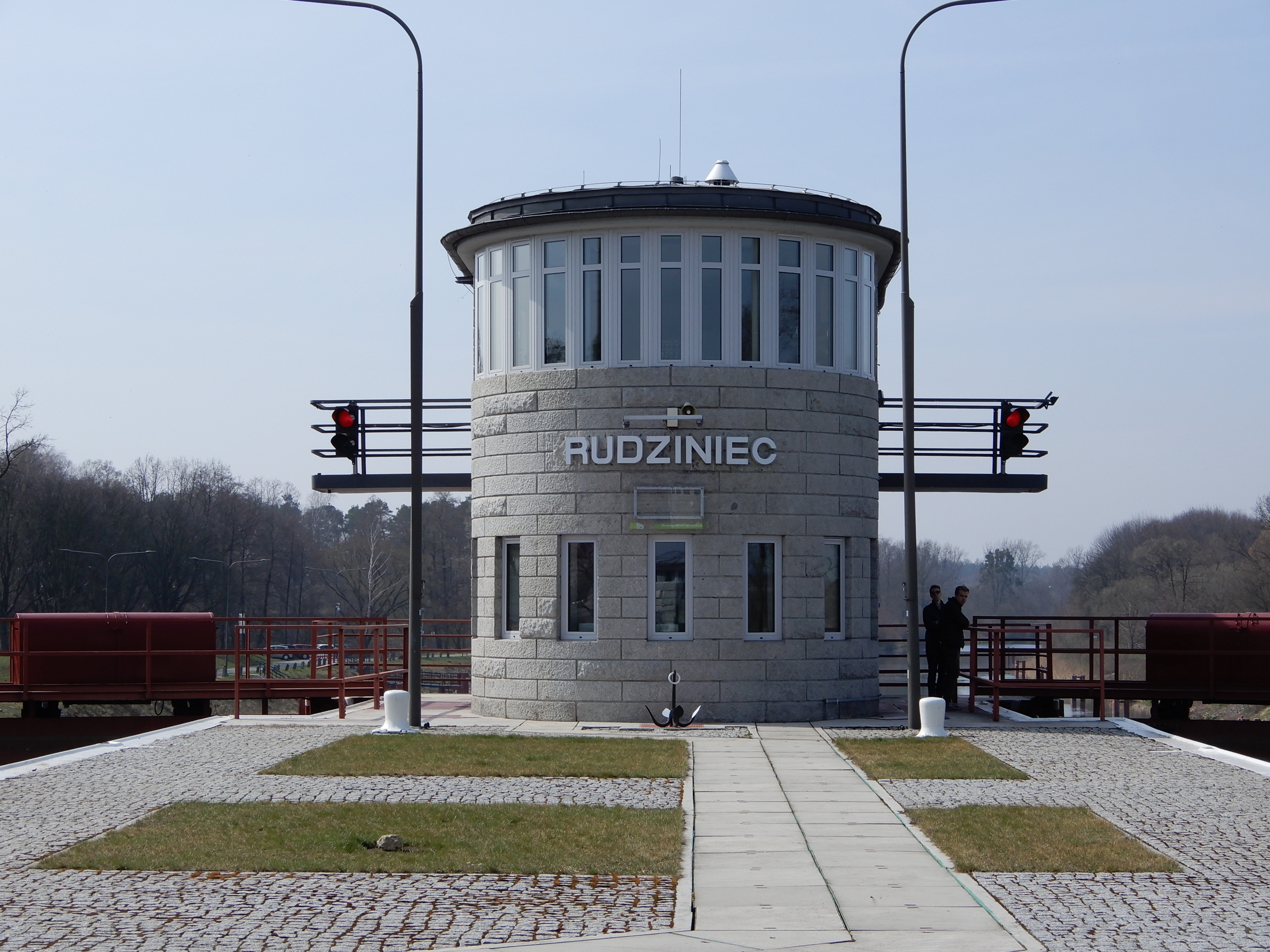
Rudziniec Lock
