= Orpelów =

- Village
- Location within Poland
- Coordinates: 51°38′N 19°13′E
- Country: Poland
- Voivodeship: Łódź
- County: Pabianice
- Gmina: Dobroń
- Population (2011): 763

Orpelów [ɔrˈpɛluf] is a village in the administrative district of Gmina Dobroń, within Pabianice County, Łódź Voivodeship, in central Poland. In March 2011, the population was 763 with a density of 119.8 persons per km².
