= Niekarmia =

- Village
- Location within Poland
- Coordinates: 50°26′N 18°27′E
- Country: Poland
- Voivodeship: Silesian
- County: Gliwice
- Gmina: Rudziniec
- Population: 138

Niekarmia [ɲɛˈkarmja] is a village in the administrative district of Gmina Rudziniec, within Gliwice County, Silesian Voivodeship, in southern Poland.
