= Kłodnica =

River in Upper Silesia

Kłodnica River
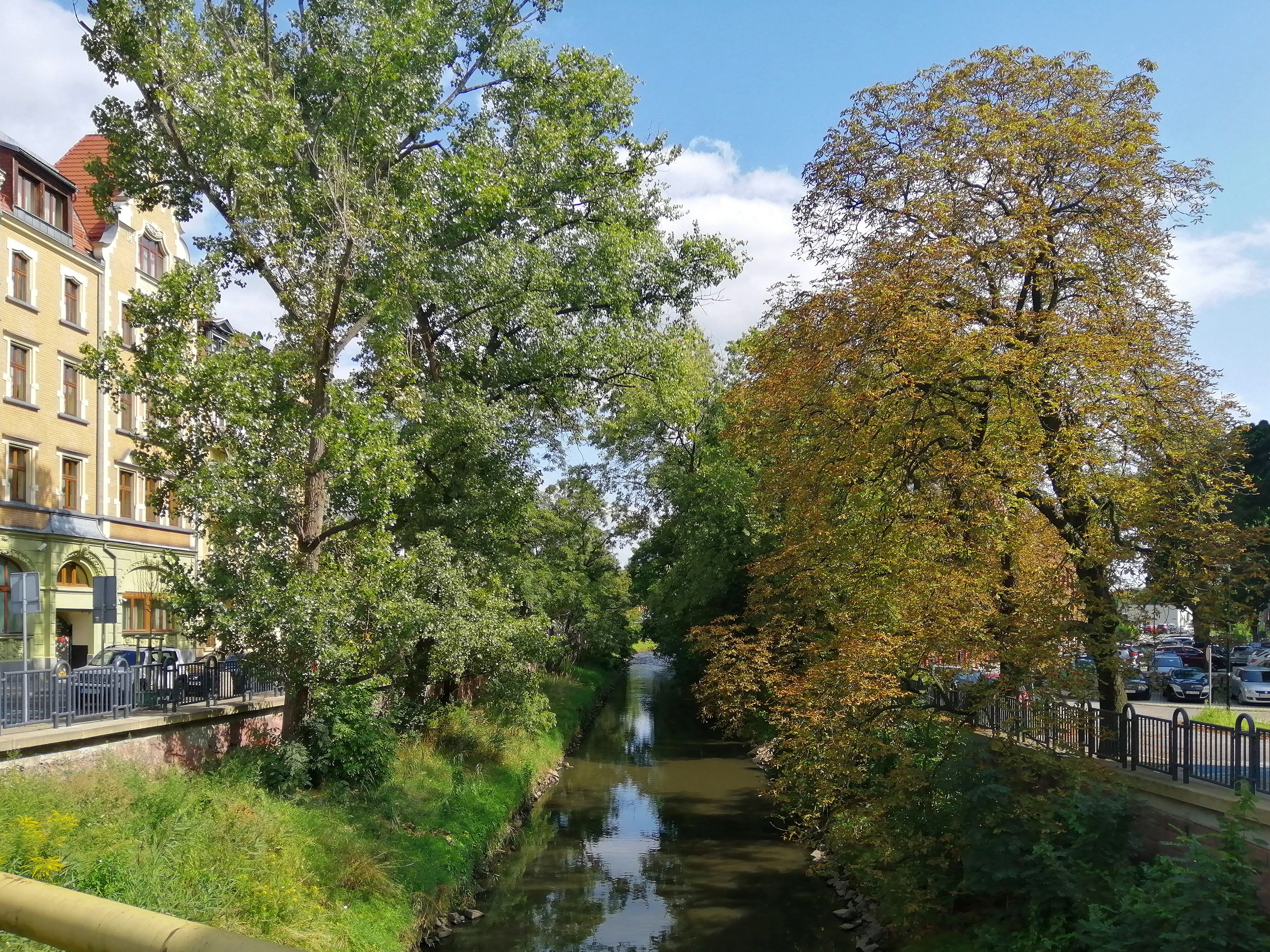
- The Kłodnica in downtown Gliwice

Location
- Country: Poland

Physical characteristics
- Source
  - location: Katowice (southern district)
  - elevation: 305 meters (1,001 ft); 165 meters (541 ft) (at mouth)
- Mouth
  - location: Odra river at Kędzierzyn-Koźle
  - coordinates: 50°19′47″N 18°09′44″E
- Length: 75 km (47 mi)
- Basin size: 1,125.8 km^{2} (434.7 sq mi)

Basin features
- Progression: Oder→ Baltic Sea

The Kłodnica is a river in the Upper Silesia region. It is about 75 km long and a right tributary of the Odra river.

Along Kłodnica's shore are Polish cities of Katowice, Kędzierzyn-Koźle, Ruda Śląska, Gliwice, and Zabrze.

There was also a Kłodnica Canal that opened in 1806. This water transport facility has been replaced by the Gliwice Canal.
