= Wymysłów-Piaski =

- Village
- Location within Poland
- Coordinates: 51°40′40″N 19°15′5″E
- Country: Poland
- Voivodeship: Łódź
- County: Pabianice
- Gmina: Dobroń

Wymysłów-Piaski (Polish pronunciation: [vɨˈmɨswuf ˈpjaskʲi]) is a village in the administrative district of Gmina Dobroń, within Pabianice County, Łódź Voivodeship, in central Poland.
