= Markówka =

- Village
- Location within Poland
- Coordinates: 51°39′N 19°14′E
- Country: Poland
- Voivodeship: Łódź
- County: Pabianice
- Gmina: Dobroń

Markówka [marˈkufka] (German: Hochweiler) is a village in the administrative district of Gmina Dobroń, within Pabianice County, Łódź Voivodeship, in central Poland.

The village was founded in 1802 as a colony of German settlers, they called it Hochweiler. In 1822, 167 people lived here, at the end of the century - 288 people, and in 1921 - 222, of whom 211 professed Protestantism. The village belonged to the Evangelical parish in Pabianice. After World War II the village was abandoned as the inhabitants fled West, a state farm was established here.
