= Łącza =

- Village
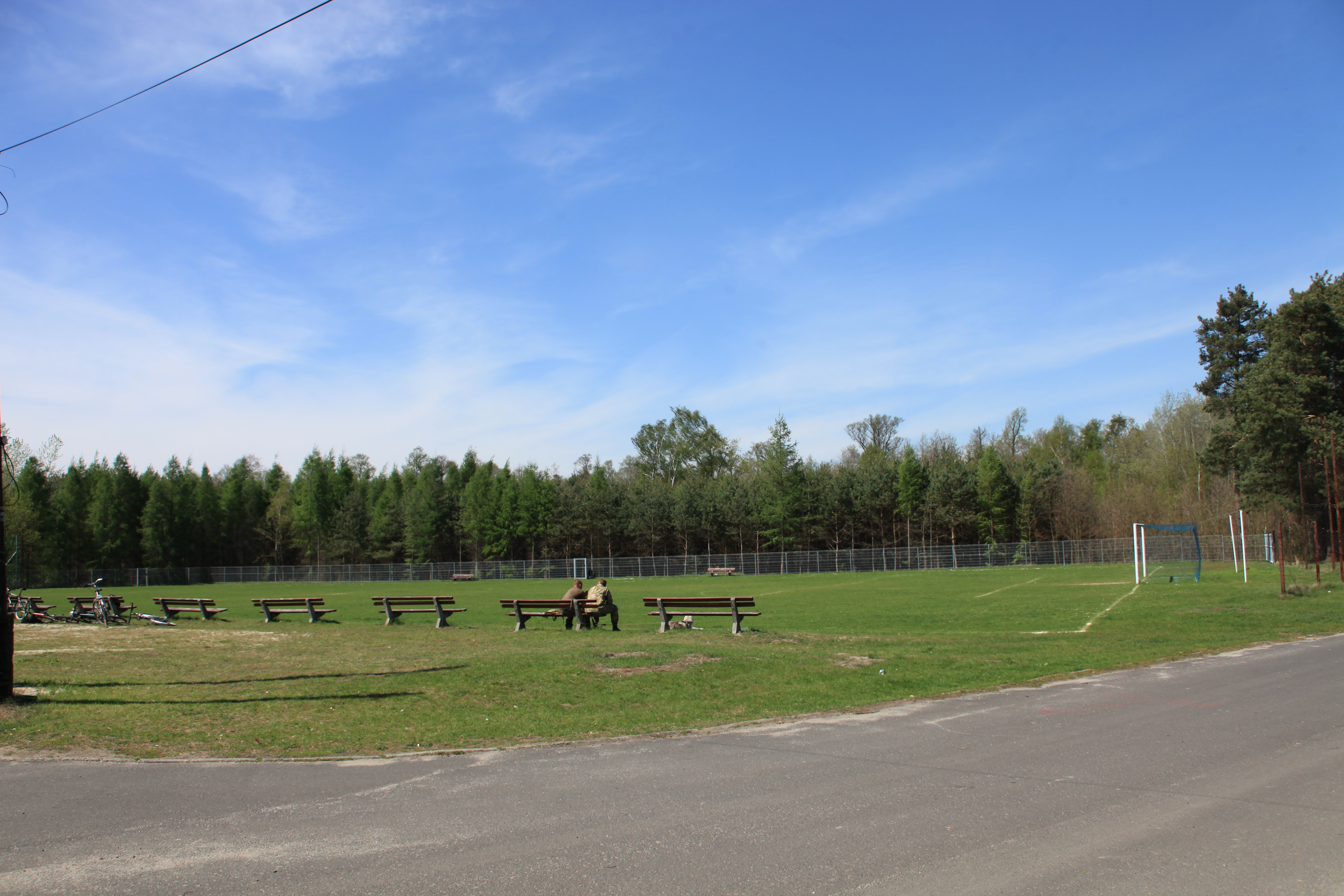

- Location within Poland
- Coordinates: 50°19′N 18°26′E
- Country: Poland
- Voivodeship: Silesian
- County: Gliwice
- Gmina: Rudziniec

Population
  - Total: 375
- Website: http://www.lacza.pl/

Łącza [ˈwɔnt͡ʂa] is a village in the administrative district of Gmina Rudziniec, within Gliwice County, Silesian Voivodeship, in southern Poland.
