= Mogilno Duże =

- Village
- Location within Poland
- Coordinates: 51°36′N 19°15′E
- Country: Poland
- Voivodeship: Łódź
- County: Pabianice
- Gmina: Dobroń

Mogilno Duże [mɔˈɡilnɔ ˈduʐɛ] is a village in the administrative district of Gmina Dobroń, within Pabianice County, Łódź Voivodeship, in central Poland.
