= Mogilno Małe =

- Village
- Location within Poland
- Coordinates: 51°36′56″N 19°15′57″E
- Country: Poland
- Voivodeship: Łódź
- County: Pabianice
- Gmina: Dobroń

Mogilno Małe [mɔˈɡilnɔ ˈmawɛ] is a village in the administrative district of Gmina Dobroń, within Pabianice County, Łódź Voivodeship, in central Poland.
