= Chechło, Silesian Voivodeship =

Chechło
- Village
- Location within Poland
- Coordinates: 50°24′N 18°24′E
- Country: Poland
- Voivodeship: Silesian
- County: Gliwice
- Gmina: Rudziniec
- Population: 513

Chechło [ˈxɛxwɔ] is a village in the administrative district of Gmina Rudziniec, within Gliwice County, Silesian Voivodeship, in southern Poland.
