= Ldzań =

- Village
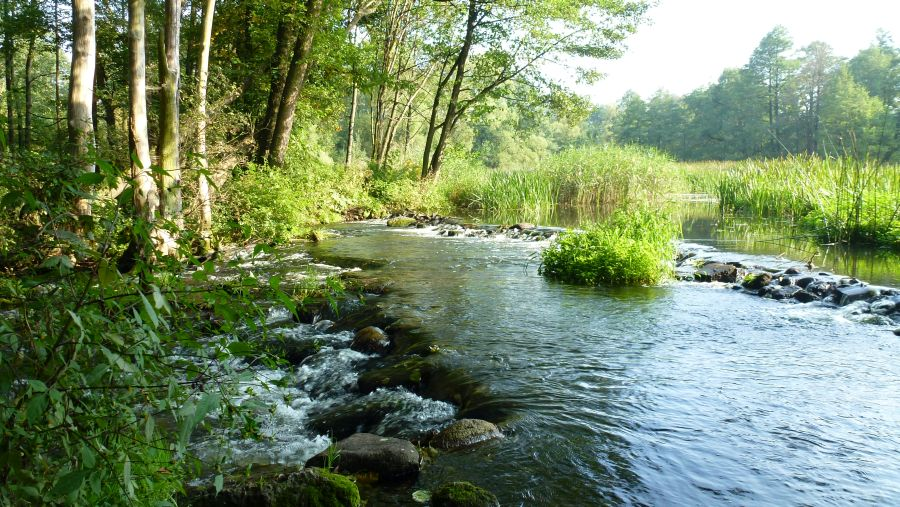

- Location within Poland
- Coordinates: 51°35′20″N 19°14′44″E
- Country: Poland
- Voivodeship: Łódź
- County: Pabianice
- Gmina: Dobroń
- Population (approx.): 190

Ldzań [ld͡zaɲ] is a village in the administrative district of Gmina Dobroń, within Pabianice County, Łódź Voivodeship, in central Poland.

The village has an approximate population of 190.
