= Kłodnica Canal =

The Kłodnicki Canal (Polish: Kanał Kłodnicki) is a canal along the Kłodnica River in Upper Silesia, Poland between the Oder River and Gliwice. Constructed when the territory was part of Prussian Silesia, it was originally known as the Klodnitz Canal (German: Klodnitzkanal).

Because the Kłodnica (Klodnitz) was not navigable, a canal was needed to provide transportation for the flourishing coal and ore mining, as well as the metallurgy industry in the Upper Silesia region. Designed by John Baildon, an engineer from Scotland and Friedrich Wilhelm von Reden, Director of the High Mining Office in Breslau (Wrocław), the canal was built between 1792 and 1812. It had a length of about 46 km (29 mi) and an altitude difference of about 49 meters (161 ft). It incorporated two hybrid inclined track/ canal locks.

The depth of the canal and the design of the locks allowed the use of vessels of up to 50 tons of payload. However, construction of rail transport facilities connecting the Upper Silesian coalfields eroded the importance of the waterway. The freight volume on the canal in 1847 was 70,000 tons, but shipments dropped to only 4,400 tons by 1865. Between 1888 and 1893, the canal was expanded to allow the passage of vessels up to 100 tons load and 1.2 meters (3.9 ft) draft. However the waterway did not regain its importance.

The Klodnitz Canal facility was replaced by the Gleiwitz (Gliwice) Canal, built from 1935 to 1939. The territory became part of Poland in 1945 after World War II.
