= Chechło Drugie =

- Village
- Location within Poland
- Coordinates: 51°38′18″N 19°17′8″E
- Country: Poland
- Voivodeship: Łódź
- County: Pabianice
- Gmina: Dobroń

Chechło Drugie [ˈxɛxwɔ ˈdruɡʲɛ] is a village in the administrative district of Gmina Dobroń, within Pabianice County, Łódź Voivodeship, in central Poland.
