= Klewno, Pomeranian Voivodeship =

Klewno
- Settlement
- Location within Poland
- Coordinates: 54°03′54″N 17°02′52″E
- Country: Poland
- Voivodeship: Pomeranian
- County: Bytów
- Gmina: Miastko
- Sołectwo: Dretynek-Trzcinno
- Population: 4

Klewno [ˈklɛvnɔ] is a settlement in Gmina Miastko, Bytów County, Pomeranian Voivodeship, in northern Poland. It lies approximately 30 km (19 mi) south-west of Bytów and 109 km (68 mi) south-west of Gdańsk (capital city of the Pomeranian Voivodeship).

From 1975 to 1998 the village was in Słupsk Voivodeship.
