= Obrowo, Gmina Miastko =

Obrowo
- Village
- Location within Poland
- Coordinates: 54°03′07″N 17°05′20″E
- Country: Poland
- Voivodeship: Pomeranian
- County: Bytów
- Gmina: Miastko
- Sołectwo: Dretynek-Trzcinno

Obrowo [ɔˈbrɔvɔ] is a village in Gmina Miastko, Bytów County, Pomeranian Voivodeship, in northern Poland.

From 1975 to 1998 the village was in Słupsk Voivodeship.
