= Stachowo, Pomeranian Voivodeship =

Stachowo
- Settlement
- Location within Poland
- Coordinates: 54°02′26″N 17°06′19″E
- Country: Poland
- Voivodeship: Pomeranian
- County: Bytów
- Gmina: Miastko
- Sołectwo: Kwisno-Szydlice
- Population: 4

Stachowo [staˈxɔvɔ] is a settlement in Gmina Miastko, Bytów County, Pomeranian Voivodeship, in northern Poland.

From 1975 to 1998, the village was in Słupsk Voivodeship.
