= Wiatrołom =

- Village
- Location within Poland
- Coordinates: 54°08′20″N 17°08′53″E
- Country: Poland
- Voivodeship: Pomeranian
- County: Bytów
- Gmina: Miastko
- Sołectwo: Role-Żabno
- Population: 63

Wiatrołom [vjaˈtrɔwɔm] (German: Viartlum, Kashubian: Wiatrołóm) is a village in Gmina Miastko, Bytów County, Pomeranian Voivodeship, in northern Poland.

From 1975 to 1998 the village was in Słupsk Voivodeship.

== Notable people ==
- Johanna von Puttkammer (1824–1894) a Prussian noblewoman and the wife of the 1st Chancellor of Germany, Otto von Bismarck.
