= Potok, Pomeranian Voivodeship =

Potok
- Settlement
- Location within Poland
- Coordinates: 54°08′24″N 17°10′30″E
- Country: Poland
- Voivodeship: Pomeranian
- County: Bytów
- Gmina: Miastko
- Sołectwo: Role-Żabno
- Population: 21

Potok [ˈpɔtɔk] is a settlement in Gmina Miastko, Bytów County, Pomeranian Voivodeship, in northern Poland.

From 1975 to 1998 the village was in Słupsk Voivodeship.
