= Ponikła, Pomeranian Voivodeship =

Ponikła
- Village
- Location within Poland
- Coordinates: 54°07′11″N 17°07′44″E
- Country: Poland
- Voivodeship: Pomeranian
- County: Bytów
- Gmina: Miastko
- Sołectwo: Role-Żabno
- Population: 18

Ponikła [pɔˈnikwa] is a village in Gmina Miastko, Bytów County, Pomeranian Voivodeship, in northern Poland.

From 1975 to 1998 the village was in Słupsk Voivodeship.
