= Przeradz, Pomeranian Voivodeship =

Przeradz
- Village
- Location within Poland
- Coordinates: 53°55′02″N 16°58′28″E
- Country: Poland
- Voivodeship: Pomeranian
- County: Bytów
- Gmina: Miastko
- Sołectwo: Słosinko
- Population: 102

Przeradz [ˈpʂɛrat͡s] (German: Heinrichsdorf) is a village in Gmina Miastko, Bytów County, Pomeranian Voivodeship, in northern Poland.

From 1975 to 1998 the village was in Słupsk Voivodeship.
