= Studnica, Pomeranian Voivodeship =

Studnica
- Settlement
- Location within Poland
- Coordinates: 54°02′23″N 16°54′35″E
- Country: Poland
- Voivodeship: Pomeranian
- County: Bytów
- Gmina: Miastko
- Sołectwo: Kamnica
- Population: 13

Studnica [studˈnit͡sa] is a settlement in Gmina Miastko, Bytów County, Pomeranian Voivodeship, in northern Poland.

From 1975 to 1998 the village was in Słupsk Voivodeship.
