= Byczyna, Pomeranian Voivodeship =

Byczyna
- Settlement
- Location within Poland
- Coordinates: 54°03′04″N 16°57′48″E
- Country: Poland
- Voivodeship: Pomeranian
- County: Bytów
- Gmina: Miastko
- Sołectwo: Węgorzynko
- Time zone: UTC+1 (CET)
  - Summer (DST): UTC+2 (CEST)
- Vehicle registration: GBY

Byczyna [bɨˈt͡ʂɨna] is a settlement in Gmina Miastko, Bytów County, Pomeranian Voivodeship, in northern Poland, on the border with West Pomeranian Voivodeship.

From 1975 to 1998 the village was in Słupsk Voivodeship.
