= Malęcino =

- Village
- Location within Poland
- Coordinates: 54°02′41″N 16°51′45″E
- Country: Poland
- Voivodeship: Pomeranian
- County: Bytów
- Gmina: Miastko
- Sołectwo: Bobięcino
- Population: 79

Malęcino [malɛnˈt͡ɕinɔ] is a village in Gmina Miastko, Bytów County, Pomeranian Voivodeship, in northern Poland, on the border with West Pomeranian Voivodeship.

From 1975 to 1998 the village was in Słupsk Voivodeship.
