= Cicholas =

- Village
- Location within Poland
- Coordinates: 53°58′14″N 16°52′52″E
- Country: Poland
- Voivodeship: Pomeranian
- County: Bytów
- Gmina: Miastko
- Sołectwo: Wołcza Wielka
- Population (2006): 10

Cicholas [t͡ɕiˈxɔlas] is a village in Gmina Miastko, Bytów County, Pomeranian Voivodeship, in northern Poland, on the border with West Pomeranian Voivodeship.

From 1975 to 1998 the village was in Słupsk Voivodeship.
