= Trzebieszyno =

- Village
- Location within Poland
- Coordinates: 53°59′07″N 16°59′59″E
- Country: Poland
- Voivodeship: Pomeranian
- County: Bytów
- Gmina: Miastko
- Sołectwo: Pasieka
- Population: 21

Trzebieszyno (Klaryszewo) is a village in Gmina Miastko, Bytów County, Pomeranian Voivodeship, in northern Poland.

From 1975 to 1998 the village was in Słupsk Voivodeship.
