= Ostrowo, Bytów County =

Ostrowo
- Settlement
- Location within Poland
- Coordinates: 54°02′54″N 17°10′51″E
- Country: Poland
- Voivodeship: Pomeranian
- County: Bytów
- Gmina: Miastko
- Sołectwo: Głodowo
- Population: 8

Ostrowo [ɔsˈtrɔvɔ] is a settlement in Gmina Miastko, Bytów County, Pomeranian Voivodeship, in northern Poland.

From 1975 to 1998 the village was in Słupsk Voivodeship.
