= Gołębsko =

- Settlement
- Location within Poland
- Coordinates: 54°01′54″N 16°52′36″E
- Country: Poland
- Voivodeship: Pomeranian
- County: Bytów
- Gmina: Miastko
- Sołectwo: Bobięcino

Gołębsko [ɡɔˈwɛmpskɔ] is a settlement in Gmina Miastko, Bytów County, Pomeranian Voivodeship, in northern Poland, on the border with West Pomeranian Voivodeship.

From 1975 to 1998 the village was in Słupsk Voivodeship.
