= Zadry =

- Settlement
- Location within Poland
- Coordinates: 54°00′35″N 17°05′57″E
- Country: Poland
- Voivodeship: Pomeranian
- County: Bytów
- Gmina: Miastko
- Sołectwo: Przęsin
- Population: 55

Zadry [ˈzadrɨ] is a settlement in Gmina Miastko, Bytów County, Pomeranian Voivodeship, in northern Poland.

From 1975 to 1998 the village was in Słupsk Voivodeship.

== Transport ==
Zadry lies along the national road.
