= Grądzień =

- Settlement
- Location within Poland
- Coordinates: 54°02′15″N 17°07′57″E
- Country: Poland
- Voivodeship: Pomeranian
- County: Bytów
- Gmina: Miastko
- Sołectwo: Wałdowo

Grądzień [ˈɡrɔnd͡ʑɛɲ] is a settlement in Gmina Miastko, Bytów County, Pomeranian Voivodeship, in northern Poland.

From 1975 to 1998 the village was in Słupsk Voivodeship.
