= Jeżewsko =

- Settlement
- Location within Poland
- Coordinates: 54°05′49″N 16°52′32″E
- Country: Poland
- Voivodeship: Pomeranian
- County: Bytów
- Gmina: Miastko
- Sołectwo: Świerzenko

Jeżewsko [jɛˈʐɛfskɔ] (German: Gesifzig) is a settlement in Gmina Miastko, Bytów County, Pomeranian Voivodeship, in northern Poland.

From 1975 to 1998 the village was in Słupsk Voivodeship.

Jeżewsko is located near the Studnica river.
