= Laudetur Jesus Christus =

Catholic salutation and phrase

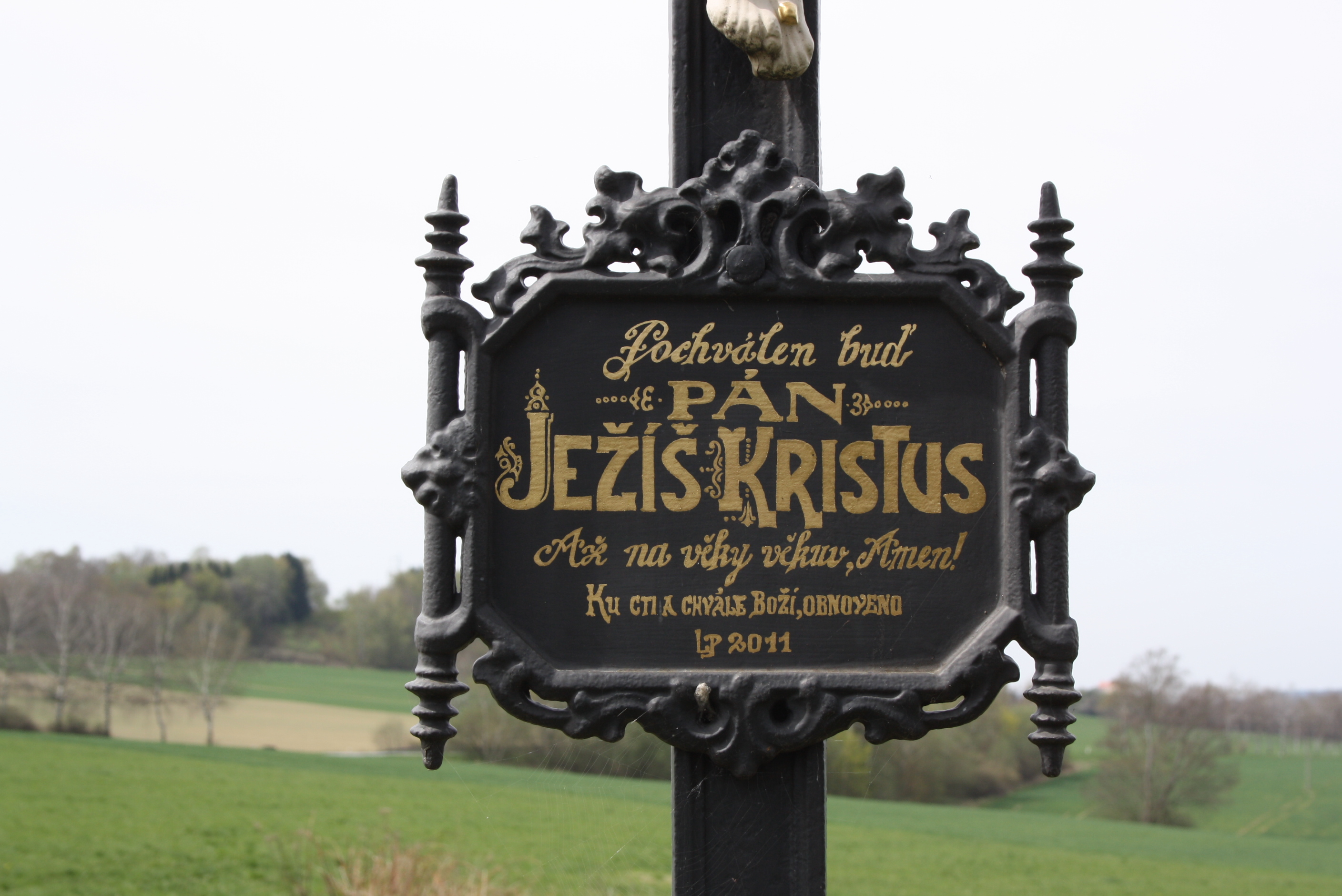
A 2011 plaque on a wayside cross in Czech that includes the phrase, “Praised be Lord Jesus Christ, forever and ever, Amen!”, in Zlátenka, Czech Republic

Laudetur Jesus Christus or Laudetur Iesus Christus (Latin for 'Praised be Jesus Christ') is a traditional Catholic salutation, which members of religious communities commonly use, especially those of specific ethnicities. Typical answers to this greeting are Semper laudetur (“Always be praised”); In sæcula sæculorum! Amen (“Forever and ever! Amen”); or [Nunc et] in æternum! Amen (“[Now and] In eternity! Amen”). The Missionary Oblates of Mary Immaculate, however, respond with Et Maria Immaculata (“And Mary Immaculate”). The phrase is also a motto of Vatican Radio.

Pius Parsch notes the traditional Catholic use of this salutation with regard to priests:

"The humanity of Christ is near in the priest. The Catholic people have kept this belief: 'Praised be Jesus Christ' they say whenever the priest comes."

In Luxembourgish, the salutation is translated as “Gelobt sei Jesus Christus”, and taught as “the respectful greeting [...] in addressing a priest”.

== Regional customs ==
=== Poland ===
A wayside cross (krzyż przydrożny) in Kamienica, Poland. These rural landmarks traditionally served as key spatial boundary points where passersby and field laborers exchanged religious greetings.

In Poland, the greeting Niech będzie pochwalony Jezus Chrystus ('Praised be Jesus Christ', often shortened to N.B.P.J.Ch. in writing) holds a deeply rooted position in both religious practice and traditional folk culture. Historically acting as a foundational social protocol rather than a simple religious formula, it traditionally replaces secular greetings like Dzień dobry, 'Good day', in rural and traditional Catholic communities.

According to Polish ethnographic records, the use of the greeting traditionally follows strict interpersonal and spatial rules:

- The Threshold Rule: The salutation is conventionally initiated the moment a visitor crosses the threshold into a home, or upon passing someone on a road or path.
- Hierarchical Protocol: Traditional etiquette dictates that the younger person greets the elder, the traveler greets the stationary individual, and a passerby greets workers engaged in field labor.
- Epistolary Custom: Among traditional families, the clergy, and historical peasant correspondence, the phrase serves as the formal opening of written letters, frequently accompanied by a handwritten sign of the cross (+).

While the standard Polish liturgical response is Na wieki wieków. Amen ("For ages of ages. Amen") or Teraz i zawsze, i na wieki wieków. Amen ("Now and always, and for ages of ages. Amen"), traditional folk Catholicism and regional dialects developed distinct variations:

Polish Variations of the Catholic Salutation
Region / Context	Greeting / Formula	Response	English Translation
Standard Liturgical	Niech będzie pochwalony Jezus Chrystus.	Na wieki wieków. Amen.	Praised be Jesus Christ. | For ages of ages. Amen.
Traditional Colloquial	Pochwalony.	Na wieki.	Praised [be]. | Forever.
Podhale (Highlander)	Niech bedzie pochwôlony Jezus Chrystus.	Na wieki wieków. Amen.	(Local dialectal variant of the standard formula.)
Kashubian	Chwalba Bògù (in Kashubian)	Na wieki wieków. Amen.	Praise to God. | For all eternity. Amen.
Field Labor Context	Szczęść Boże!	Daj Boże! or Bóg zapłać!	God bless [your labor]! | God grant it! / God reward you!

Polish ethnographers, including Zygmunt Gloger and Oskar Kolberg, documented that the greeting historically functioned as a vital marker of the sacrum penetrating the profanum of daily rural life. In historical Polish peasant culture, refusing to answer with the correct religious formula was viewed not merely as a breach of etiquette, but as a spiritual rupture or an indicator of ill intent, as the greeting served to confirm that a stranger belonged to the same spiritual and cultural community.

Linguistically, the standard formula is frequently expanded with additional descriptive honorifics or theological additions, particularly within traditional devotions and seasonal liturgy. In folk piety, the standard greeting is sometimes linked sequentially with a secondary invocation to the Blessed Virgin Mary, were the initiator adds i Maryja Zawsze Dziewica ("and Mary Ever Virgin"), prompting the respondent to close or exchange with Teraz i na wieki, 'Now and forever'.

Other Christian denominations also use it, including Lutherans and other Protestants, along with some Eastern Christians.

== See also ==
- List of ecclesiastical abbreviations
- List of Latin phrases
