= Świeszynko =

- Village
- Location within Poland
- Coordinates: 54°00′08″N 17°04′40″E
- Country: Poland
- Voivodeship: Pomeranian
- County: Bytów
- Gmina: Miastko
- Sołectwo: Świeszyno
- Population: 71

Świeszynko (Polish: [ɕfjɛˈʂɨŋkɔ]) is a village in Gmina Miastko, Bytów County, Pomeranian Voivodeship, in northern Poland.

From 1975 to 1998 the village was in Słupsk Voivodeship.
