= Tursko, Pomeranian Voivodeship =

Tursko
- Village
- Location within Poland
- Coordinates: 54°07′14″N 16°56′45″E
- Country: Poland
- Voivodeship: Pomeranian
- County: Bytów
- Gmina: Miastko
- Sołectwo: Dretyń
- Population: 199

Tursko [ˈturskɔ] is a village in Gmina Miastko, Bytów County, Pomeranian Voivodeship, in northern Poland.

From 1975 to 1998 the village was in Słupsk Voivodeship.
