= Męciny =

- Village
- Location within Poland
- Coordinates: 54°04′50″N 17°08′31″E
- Country: Poland
- Voivodeship: Pomeranian
- County: Bytów
- Gmina: Miastko
- Sołectwo: Czarnica

Męciny [mɛnˈt͡ɕinɨ], also known as Czarnica-Młyn [t͡ʂarˈnit͡sa ˈmwɨn] is a village in Gmina Miastko, Bytów County, Pomeranian Voivodeship, in northern Poland.

From 1975 to 1998 the village was in the administrative division called Słupsk Voivodeship, but that administrative division was superseded in 1999 by Pomeranian Voivodeship and another administrative division.

Męciny is located near the Wieprza, which is a tributary of the Baltic Sea.
