= Lipczyno =

- Settlement
- Location within Poland
- Coordinates: 53°58′29″N 17°02′14″E
- Country: Poland
- Voivodeship: Pomeranian
- County: Bytów
- Gmina: Miastko
- Sołectwo: Pasieka

Lipczyno [lipˈt͡ʂɨnɔ] is a settlement in Gmina Miastko, Bytów County, Pomeranian Voivodeship, in northern Poland.

From 1975 to 1998 the village was in Słupsk Voivodeship.
