= Toczeń, Pomeranian Voivodeship =

Toczeń
- Village
- Location within Poland
- Coordinates: 53°59′48″N 16°53′09″E
- Country: Poland
- Voivodeship: Pomeranian
- County: Bytów
- Gmina: Miastko
- Sołectwo: Kamnica
- Population: 9

Toczeń [ˈtɔt͡ʂɛɲ] is a village in Gmina Miastko, Bytów County, Pomeranian Voivodeship, in northern Poland.

From 1975 to 1998 the village was in Słupsk Voivodeship.
