= Węglewo, Pomeranian Voivodeship =

Węglewo
- Village
- Location within Poland
- Coordinates: 53°56′21″N 16°54′54″E
- Country: Poland
- Voivodeship: Pomeranian
- County: Bytów
- Gmina: Miastko
- Sołectwo: Miłocice
- Population: 74

Węglewo [vɛŋˈɡlɛvɔ] is a village in Gmina Miastko, Bytów County, Pomeranian Voivodeship, in northern Poland.

From 1975 to 1998 the village was in Słupsk Voivodeship.

== Transport ==
Węglewo lies along the national road.
