= Łodzierz =

- Village
- Location within Poland
- Coordinates: 54°01′16″N 16°57′07″E
- Country: Poland
- Voivodeship: Pomeranian
- County: Bytów
- Gmina: Miastko
- Sołectwo: Węgorzynko
- Population: 92

Łodzierz [ˈwɔd͡ʑɛʂ] is a village in Gmina Miastko, Bytów County, Pomeranian Voivodeship, in northern Poland.

From 1975 to 1998 the village was in Słupsk Voivodeship.

== Transport ==
Łodzierz lies along the voivodeship road.
