= Cieszanowo =

- Settlement
- Location within Poland
- Coordinates: 54°01′45″N 17°08′14″E
- Country: Poland
- Voivodeship: Pomeranian
- County: Bytów
- Gmina: Miastko
- Sołectwo: Piaszczyna

Cieszanowo [t͡ɕɛʂaˈnɔvɔ] is a settlement in Gmina Miastko, Bytów County, Pomeranian Voivodeship, in northern Poland.

From 1975 to 1998 the village was in Słupsk Voivodeship.
