= Potok-Młyn =

- Settlement
- Location within Poland
- Coordinates: 54°08′07″N 17°07′29″E
- Country: Poland
- Voivodeship: Pomeranian
- County: Bytów
- Gmina: Miastko
- Sołectwo: Miłocice
- Population: 0

Potok-Młyn [ˈpɔtɔk ˈmwɨn] is a former settlement in Gmina Miastko, Bytów County, Pomeranian Voivodeship, in northern Poland.

From 1975 to 1998 the village was in Słupsk Voivodeship.
