= Łosośniki, Pomeranian Voivodeship =

Łosośniki
- Settlement
- Location within Poland
- Coordinates: 54°03′36″N 17°00′39″E
- Country: Poland
- Voivodeship: Pomeranian
- County: Bytów
- Gmina: Miastko
- Sołectwo: Dretyń

Łosośniki [wɔsɔɕˈniki] is a settlement in Gmina Miastko, Bytów County, Pomeranian Voivodeship, in northern Poland. The village was in Słupsk Voivodeship from 1975 to 1998, when Pomeranian Voivodeship and West Pomeranian Voivodeship (Sławno County) superseded Słupsk Voivodeship (province).
