= Wołcza =

Wołcza may refer to the following places in Poland:

- Wołcza (river)
- Wołcza Mała
- Wołcza Wielka
