= Łaziska =

Łaziska may refer to several localities in Poland:

- Łaziska Górne, a town in Silesian Voivodeship (south Poland)
- Łaziska, Silesian Voivodeship (south Poland)
- Łaziska, Kielce County in Świętokrzyskie Voivodeship (south-central Poland)
- Łaziska, Łódź Voivodeship (central Poland)
- Łaziska, Lower Silesian Voivodeship (south-west Poland)
- Łaziska, Opole Voivodeship (south Poland)
- Łaziska, Płock County in Masovian Voivodeship (central Poland)
- Łaziska, Pomeranian Voivodeship (north Poland)
- Łaziska, Sochaczew County in Masovian Voivodeship (east-central Poland)
- Łaziska, Staszów County in Świętokrzyskie Voivodeship (south-central Poland)
- Łaziska, Gmina Łaziska in Opole County, Lublin Voivodeship (east Poland)
- Łaziska, Zamość County in Lublin Voivodeship (east Poland)
- Łaziska, Kuyavian-Pomeranian Voivodeship (central Poland)
- Łaziska, Lipsko County in Masovian Voivodeship (east-central Poland)
- Łaziska, Mińsk County in Masovian Voivodeship (east-central Poland)
- Łaziska, Szydłowiec County in Masovian Voivodeship (east-central Poland)
- Łaziska, Koło County in Greater Poland Voivodeship (central Poland)
- Łaziska, Wągrowiec County in Greater Poland Voivodeship (west-central Poland)
