= Krzeszewo =

- Settlement
- Location within Poland
- Coordinates: 53°58′43″N 16°52′31″E
- Country: Poland
- Voivodeship: Pomeranian
- County: Bytów
- Gmina: Miastko
- Sołectwo: Wołcza Wielka
- Population: 9

Krzeszewo [kʂɛˈʂɛvɔ] is a settlement in Gmina Miastko, Bytów County, Pomeranian Voivodeship, in northern Poland, on the border with West Pomeranian Voivodeship.

From 1975 to 1998 the village was in Słupsk Voivodeship.
