= Zajączkowo =

Zajączkowo may refer to the following places:

- Zajączkowo, Greater Poland Voivodeship (west-central Poland)
- Zajączkowo, Kuyavian-Pomeranian Voivodeship (north-central Poland)
- Zajączkowo, Podlaskie Voivodeship (north-east Poland)
- Zajączkowo, Bytów County in Pomeranian Voivodeship (north Poland)
- Zajączkowo, Kościerzyna County in Pomeranian Voivodeship (north Poland)
- Zajączkowo, Słupsk County in Pomeranian Voivodeship (north Poland)
- Zajączkowo, Tczew County in Pomeranian Voivodeship (north Poland)
- Zajączkowo, Elbląg County in Warmian-Masurian Voivodeship (north Poland)
- Zajączkowo, Nowe Miasto County in Warmian-Masurian Voivodeship (north Poland)
- Zajączkowo, Ostróda County in Warmian-Masurian Voivodeship (north Poland)
- Zajączkowo, West Pomeranian Voivodeship (north-west Poland)
