= Gatka, Bytów County =

Gatka Gatczi (Kashubian)
- Village
- Location within Poland
- Coordinates: 54°02′24″N 16°53′06″E
- Country: Poland
- Voivodeship: Pomeranian
- County: Bytów
- Gmina: Miastko
- Population: 37

Gatka (Polish: [ˈɡatka]) is a village in Gmina Miastko, Bytów County, Pomeranian Voivodeship, in northern Poland.

From 1975 to 1998 the village was in Słupsk Voivodeship.
