= Kowalewice =

Kowalewice may refer to the following places in Poland:

- Kowalewice, Pomeranian Voivodeship (north Poland)
- Kowalewice, Łódź Voivodeship (central Poland)
- Kowalewice, West Pomeranian Voivodeship (north-west Poland)
