= Zarna =

Zarna may refer to:

== Places and jurisdictions ==
Africa

- Zarna (Africa), an Ancient city of Roman Africa, former diocese and Latin Catholic titular bishopric

Asia

- Zərnə, Azerbaijan
- Zarna, alternate name of Zarnan, Lorestan, Iran
- Zarna, alternate name of Zarnaq, Iran
- Zarna, alternate name of Zarneh, Isfahan, Iran

Europe

- Żarna, Poland

== Persons ==
- Zarna, Indian/Hindi name for girls, meaning plural of spring and/or origin of river where water flows to the surface of the earth from multiple locations in the mountains
