= Biała, Bytów County =

Biała
- Village
- Location within Poland
- Coordinates: 54°05′28″N 16°49′58″E
- Country: Poland
- Voivodeship: Pomeranian
- County: Bytów
- Gmina: Miastko
- Population: 116

Biała [ˈbjawa] (German: Bial) is a village in Gmina Miastko, Bytów County, Pomeranian Voivodeship, in northern Poland, on the border with West Pomeranian Voivodeship.

From 1975 to 1998 the village was in Słupsk Voivodeship.

== Transport ==
Biała lies along the voivodeship road.
