= Domanice, Bytów County =

Domanice
- Village
- Location within Poland
- Coordinates: 53°56′07″N 16°56′35″E
- Country: Poland
- Voivodeship: Pomeranian
- County: Bytów
- Gmina: Miastko
- Sołectwo: Słosinko
- Population: 88

Domanice [dɔmaˈnit͡sɛ] is a village in Gmina Miastko, Bytów County, Pomeranian Voivodeship, in northern Poland, on the border with West Pomeranian Voivodeship.

From 1975 to 1998 the village was in Słupsk Voivodeship.
