= Świerzno =

Świerzno may refer to:

- Świerzno, Pomeranian Voivodeship
- Świerzno, West Pomeranian Voivodeship
- Świerzno, Witebsk Voivodeship
