= Łaziska, Pomeranian Voivodeship =

Łaziska
- Settlement
- Location within Poland
- Coordinates: 53°55′53″N 16°55′04″E
- Country: Poland
- Voivodeship: Pomeranian
- County: Bytów
- Gmina: Miastko
- Sołectwo: Miłocice

Łaziska [waˈʑiska] is a settlement in Gmina Miastko, Bytów County, Pomeranian Voivodeship, in northern Poland.

From 1975 to 1998 the village was in Słupsk Voivodeship.
