= Kawczyn, Pomeranian Voivodeship =

Kawczyn
- Village
- Location within Poland
- Coordinates: 54°05′10″N 16°53′12″E
- Country: Poland
- Voivodeship: Pomeranian
- County: Bytów
- Gmina: Miastko
- Sołectwo: Kawcze

Kawczyn (Kawcze-Młyn) is a village in Gmina Miastko, Bytów County, Pomeranian Voivodeship, in northern Poland.

From 1975 to 1998 the village was in Słupsk Voivodeship.

Kawczyn is located near the Studnica river.
