= Pawłówek =

Pawłówek may refer to the following places:

- Pawłówek, Kuyavian-Pomeranian Voivodeship (north-central Poland)
- Pawłówek, Łódź Voivodeship (central Poland)
- Pawłówek, Lublin Voivodeship (east Poland)
- Pawłówek, Pułtusk County in Masovian Voivodeship (east-central Poland)
- Pawłówek, Sochaczew County in Masovian Voivodeship (east-central Poland)
- Pawłówek, Kalisz County in Greater Poland Voivodeship (west-central Poland)
- Pawłówek, Nowy Tomyśl County in Greater Poland Voivodeship (west-central Poland)
- Pawłówek, Gmina Nowe Skalmierzyce, Ostrów County in Greater Poland Voivodeship (west-central Poland)
