= Cisy =

Cisy may refer to the following places in Poland:

- Cisy, Podlaskie Voivodeship (north-east Poland)
- Cisy, Bytów County in Pomeranian Voivodeship (north Poland)
- Cisy, Malbork County in Pomeranian Voivodeship (north Poland)
- Cisy, Warmian-Masurian Voivodeship (north Poland)
