= Białuń =

Białuń may refer to the following places:

- Białuń, Pomeranian Voivodeship (north Poland)
- Białuń, Goleniów County in West Pomeranian Voivodeship (north-west Poland)
- Białuń, Stargard County in West Pomeranian Voivodeship (north-west Poland)
