= Lesieniec =

Lesieniec may refer to the following places:

- Lesieniec, Lesser Poland Voivodeship (south Poland)
- Lesieniec, Łódź Voivodeship (central Poland)
- Lesieniec, Warmian-Masurian Voivodeship (north Poland)
