= Zajączkowo, Bytów County =

Zajączkowo
- Settlement
- Location within Poland
- Coordinates: 53°58′25″N 16°53′04″E
- Country: Poland
- Voivodeship: Pomeranian
- County: Bytów
- Gmina: Miastko
- Sołectwo: Wołcza Wielka

Zajączkowo [zajɔnt͡ʂˈkɔvɔ] is a settlement in Gmina Miastko, Bytów County, Pomeranian Voivodeship, in northern Poland.

From 1975 to 1998 the village was in Słupsk Voivodeship.
