= Popowice, Pomeranian Voivodeship =

Popowice
- Village
- Location within Poland
- Coordinates: 54°04′17″N 17°11′32″E
- Country: Poland
- Voivodeship: Pomeranian
- County: Bytów
- Gmina: Miastko
- Population: 52

Popowice [pɔpɔˈvit͡sɛ] is a village in Gmina Miastko, Bytów County, Pomeranian Voivodeship, in northern Poland.

From 1975 to 1998 the village was in Słupsk Voivodeship.
