= Olszewiec, Pomeranian Voivodeship =

Olszewiec
- Settlement
- Location within Poland
- Coordinates: 54°07′49″N 17°11′39″E
- Country: Poland
- Voivodeship: Pomeranian
- County: Bytów
- Gmina: Miastko
- Sołectwo: Role-Żabno
- Population: 3

Olszewiec [ɔlˈʂɛvjɛt͡s] is a settlement in Gmina Miastko, Bytów County, Pomeranian Voivodeship, in northern Poland.

From 1975 to 1998 the village was in Słupsk Voivodeship.
