= Chlebowo, Pomeranian Voivodeship =

Chlebowo
- Village
- Location within Poland
- Coordinates: 53°59′36″N 17°02′31″E
- Country: Poland
- Voivodeship: Pomeranian
- County: Bytów
- Gmina: Miastko
- Elevation: 250 m (820 ft)
- Population (2008): 232

Chlebowo ([xlɛˈbɔvɔ]; German: Kornburg) is a village in Gmina Miastko, Bytów County, Pomeranian Voivodeship, in northern Poland. There are many lobelia lakes, ribbon lakes and ponds in the area.

From 1975 to 1998 the village was in Słupsk Voivodeship.
