= Borzykowo, Pomeranian Voivodeship =

Borzykowo
- Settlement
- Location within Poland
- Coordinates: 54°02′03″N 17°09′36″E
- Country: Poland
- Voivodeship: Pomeranian
- County: Bytów
- Gmina: Miastko
- Sołectwo: Piaszczyna

Borzykowo [bɔʐɨˈkɔvɔ] is a settlement in Gmina Miastko, Bytów County, Pomeranian Voivodeship, in northern Poland.

From 1975 to 1998 the village was in Słupsk Voivodeship.
