= Dolsko (disambiguation) =

Dolsko is a settlement in Slovenia.

Dolsko may also refer to the following places in Poland:

- Dolsko, Pomeranian Voivodeship (north Poland)
- Dolsko, West Pomeranian Voivodeship (north-west Poland)
