= Kamnica =

Kamnica may refer to:

In Poland:

- Kamnica, Poland, a village in the Miastko district of Bytów County, Pomeranian Voivodeship

In Slovenia:

- Kamnica, Dol pri Ljubljani, a village in the Municipality of Dol pri Ljubljani
- Kamnica, Maribor, a village in the City Municipality of Maribor
