= Białuń, Pomeranian Voivodeship =

Białuń
- Settlement
- Location within Poland
- Coordinates: 54°02′37″N 17°12′45″E
- Country: Poland
- Voivodeship: Pomeranian
- County: Bytów
- Gmina: Miastko
- Sołectwo: Głodowo
- Population: 113

Białuń [ˈbjawuɲ] is a settlement in Gmina Miastko, Bytów County, Pomeranian Voivodeship, in northern Poland.

From 1975 to 1998 the village was in Słupsk Voivodeship.
