= Borzykowo =

Borzykowo may refer to the following places:

- Borzykowo, Pomeranian Voivodeship (north Poland)
- Borzykowo, Greater Poland Voivodeship (west-central Poland)
