= Domanice =

Domanice may refer to the following places in Poland:

- Domanice, Wołów County in Lower Silesian Voivodeship (south-west Poland)
- Domanice, Wrocław County in Lower Silesian Voivodeship (south-west Poland)
- Domanice, Masovian Voivodeship (east-central Poland)
- Domanice, Greater Poland Voivodeship (west-central Poland)
- Domanice, Bytów County in Pomeranian Voivodeship (north Poland)
- Domanice, Słupsk County in Pomeranian Voivodeship (north Poland)
