= Turowo, Pomeranian Voivodeship =

Turowo
- Village
- Location within Poland
- Coordinates: 54°05′34″N 17°10′53″E
- Country: Poland
- Voivodeship: Pomeranian
- County: Bytów
- Gmina: Miastko
- Population: 124

Turowo [tuˈrɔvɔ] (German: Steinau) is a village in Gmina Miastko, Bytów County, Pomeranian Voivodeship, in northern Poland.

From 1975 to 1998 the village was in Słupsk Voivodeship.
