= Redociny =

- Village
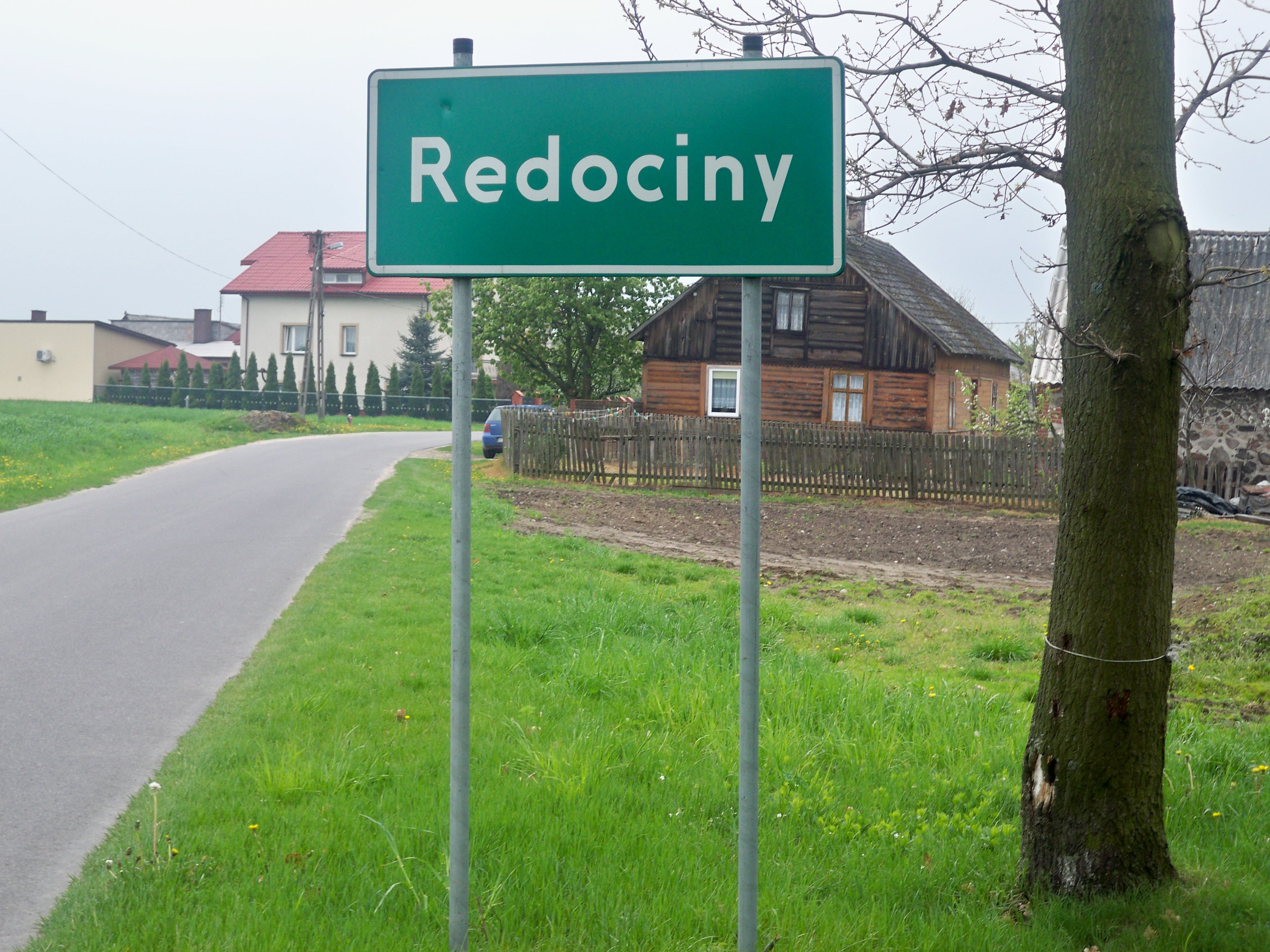

- Location within Poland
- Coordinates: 51°32′N 19°27′E
- Country: Poland
- Voivodeship: Łódź
- County: Pabianice
- Gmina: Dłutów

Redociny [rɛdɔˈt͡ɕinɨ] is a village in the administrative district of Gmina Dłutów, within Pabianice County, Łódź Voivodeship, in central Poland.
