= Przęsin =

- Village
- Location within Poland
- Coordinates: 54°00′42″N 17°02′00″E
- Country: Poland
- Voivodeship: Pomeranian
- County: Bytów
- Gmina: Miastko
- Population: 323

Przęsin [ˈpʂɛ̃ɕin] is a village in Gmina Miastko, Bytów County, Pomeranian Voivodeship, in northern Poland, on the border with West Pomeranian Voivodeship.

From 1975 to 1998 the village was in Słupsk Voivodeship.

== Transport ==
Przęsin lies along the national road.
