= Dolsko, Pomeranian Voivodeship =

Dolsko
- Village
- Location within Poland
- Coordinates: 54°01′19″N 17°07′04″E
- Country: Poland
- Voivodeship: Pomeranian
- County: Bytów
- Gmina: Miastko
- Population: 96

Dolsko [ˈdɔlskɔ] (German: Dulzig) is a village in Gmina Miastko, Bytów County, Pomeranian Voivodeship, in northern Poland, on the border with West Pomeranian Voivodeship.

From 1975 to 1998 the village was in Słupsk Voivodeship.
