= Świerzno, Pomeranian Voivodeship =

Świerzno
- Village
- Location within Poland
- Coordinates: 54°04′17″N 16°50′44″E
- Country: Poland
- Voivodeship: Pomeranian
- County: Bytów
- Gmina: Miastko
- Population: 222

Świerzno (Polish: [ˈɕfjɛʐnɔ]) (German: Groß Schwirsen) is a village in Gmina Miastko, Bytów County, Pomeranian Voivodeship, in northern Poland.

From 1975 to 1998 the village was in Słupsk Voivodeship.
