= Okunino =

- Village
- Location within Poland
- Coordinates: 54°03′55″N 16°57′00″E
- Country: Poland
- Voivodeship: Pomeranian
- County: Bytów
- Gmina: Miastko
- Sołectwo: Okunino-Kowalewice

Okunino [ɔkuˈninɔ] (German: Wocknin, Kashubian: Òkònino) is a village in Gmina Miastko, Bytów County, Pomeranian Voivodeship, in northern Poland.

From 1975 to 1998 the village was in Słupsk Voivodeship.
