= Świeszyno, Pomeranian Voivodeship =

Świeszyno
- Village
- Location within Poland
- Coordinates: 53°58′58″N 17°04′14″E
- Country: Poland
- Voivodeship: Pomeranian
- County: Bytów
- Gmina: Miastko
- Population: 152

Świeszyno (Polish: [ɕfjɛˈʂɨnɔ]) (German: Schwessin) is a village in Gmina Miastko, Bytów County, Pomeranian Voivodeship, in northern Poland.

From 1975 to 1998 the village was in Słupsk Voivodeship.
