= Kwisno =

- Village
- Location within Poland
- Coordinates: 54°04′50″N 17°07′03″E
- Country: Poland
- Voivodeship: Pomeranian
- County: Bytów
- Gmina: Miastko
- Sołectwo: Kwisno-Szydlice
- Population: 48

Kwisno [ˈkfisnɔ] (German: Gewiesen; Kashubian: Gwizdno) is a village in Gmina Miastko, Bytów County, Pomeranian Voivodeship, in northern Poland.

From 1975 to 1998 the village was in Słupsk Voivodeship.
