= Świerzenko =

- Village
- Location within Poland
- Coordinates: 54°04′58″N 16°51′17″E
- Country: Poland
- Voivodeship: Pomeranian
- County: Bytów
- Gmina: Miastko
- Population: 499

Świerzenko (Polish: [ɕfjɛˈʐɛŋkɔ]; Kashubian: Swierzenkò; German: Klein Schwirsen) is a village in Gmina Miastko, Bytów County, Pomeranian Voivodeship, in northern Poland.

From 1975 to 1998 the village was in Słupsk Voivodeship.

It has a population of 499.

== Transport ==
Świerzenko lies along the voivodeship road.
