= Kociołki-Las =

Settlement in Gmina Dłutów, Poland

- Settlement
- Location within Poland
- Coordinates: 51°31′44″N 19°24′02″E
- Country: Poland
- Voivodeship: Łódź
- County: Pabianice
- Gmina: Dłutów

Kociołki-Las [kɔˈt͡ɕɔu̯ki ˈlas] is a settlement in the administrative district of Gmina Dłutów, within Pabianice County, Łódź Voivodeship, in central Poland.
