= Dłutów =

- Village
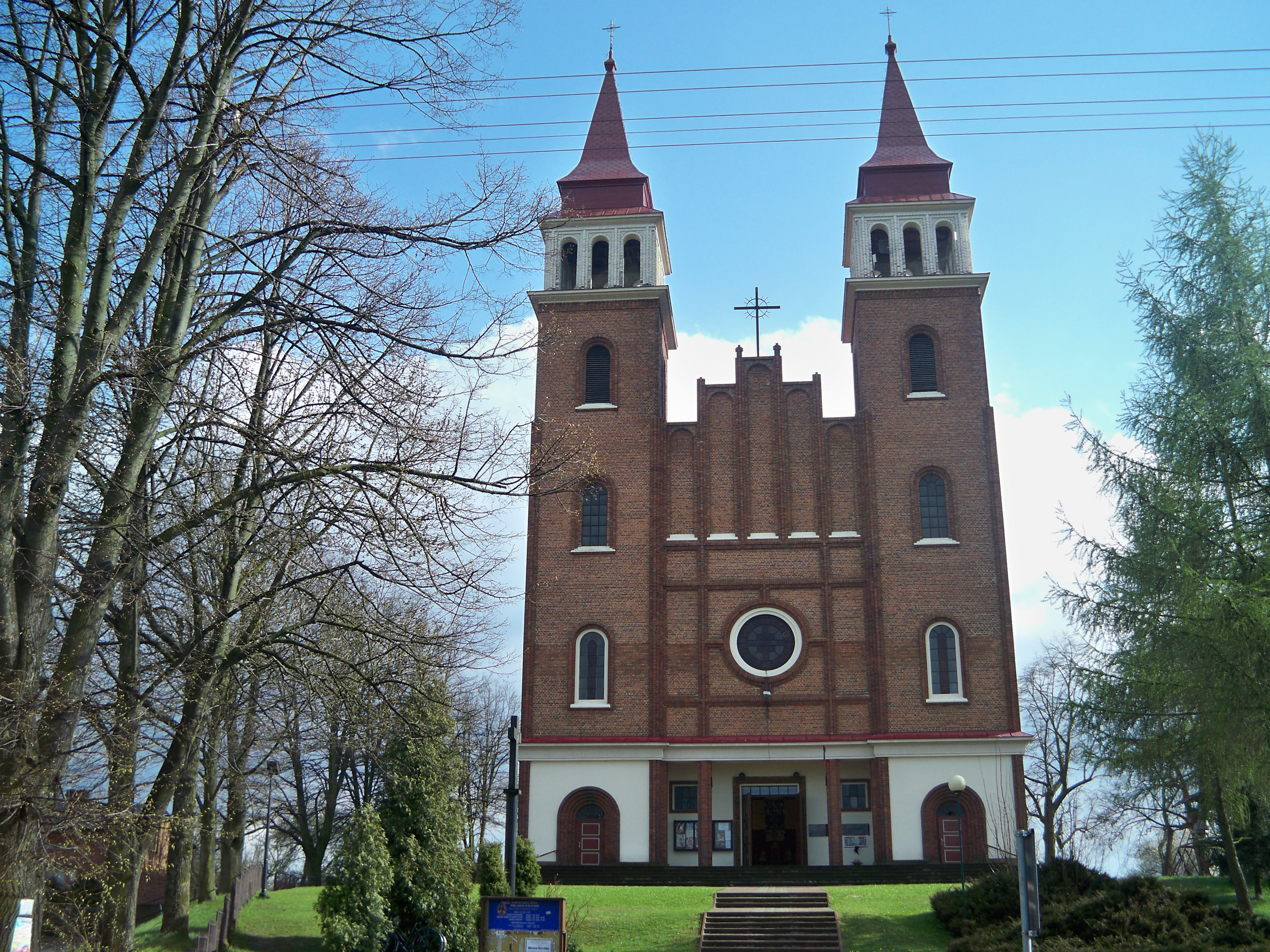
- Church of the Sacred Heart of Jesus and Three Wise Men

- Location within Poland
- Coordinates: 51°33′31″N 19°23′24″E
- Country: Poland
- Voivodeship: Łódź
- County: Pabianice
- Gmina: Dłutów

Population
  - Total: 1,000

Dłutów [ˈdwutuf] is a village in Pabianice County, Łódź Voivodeship, in central Poland. It is the seat of the gmina (administrative district) called Gmina Dłutów.
