= Janusz Bolonek =

Polish prelate

- Titular Archbishop of Madaurus
- Church: Roman Catholic Church

Personal details
- Born: Januariusz Mikołaj Bolonek; December 6, 1938 Huta Dłutowska, Poland
- Died: March 2, 2016 (aged 77)

Janusz (Januariusz Mikołaj) Bolonek (6 December 1938 – 2 March 2016) was a Polish prelate of the Catholic Church who worked in the diplomatic service of the Holy See. He was named an archbishop in 1989 and represented the Holy See in Uruguay, Bulgaria, Romania, and the Macedonia.

== Biography ==
Janusz Bolonek was born in Huta Dłutowska, Poland, on 6 December 1938. After studying at the local seminary he was ordained priest on 17 December 1961 in Łódź, Poland.

To prepare for a diplomatic career he entered the Pontifical Ecclesiastical Academy in 1967. He also studied at both the Pontifical Gregorian University and the Pontifical Lateran University.

His early assignments in the diplomatic service included stints in Nicaragua, the United States, and Egypt, and then at the Secretariat of State in Rome where he helped organize Pope John Paul's trips to Poland in 1983 and 1987 and worked on the commission negotiating the restoration of diplomatic relations between Poland and the Holy See.

On 25 September 1989, Pope John Paul II named him a titular archbishop of Madaurus and apostolic pro-nuncio to the Côte d'Ivoire. He received his episcopal consecration from Pope John Paul on 20 October. On 18 November 1989, he was given additional responsibility as pro-nuncio to Niger and Burkina Faso.

On 23 January 1995, he was named Apostolic Nuncio to Romania.

On 30 September 1998 he was assigned to the staff of the Secretariat of State in Rome.

On 11 November 1999, Pope John Paul named him nuncio to Uruguay.

Pope Benedict XVI named him nuncio to Bulgaria on 24 May 2008, and added the responsibilities of the nuncio to Macedonia on 4 May 2011. He retired from the diplomatic corps on 6 December 2013.

In 2014 a Polish historian accused him of spying while working in the Vatican, where he learned that Polish colonel Ryszard Kukliński was a CIA agent.

He died on 2 March 2016.
