= Gmina Dłutów =

Gmina Dłutów Dłutów Commune
- Gmina
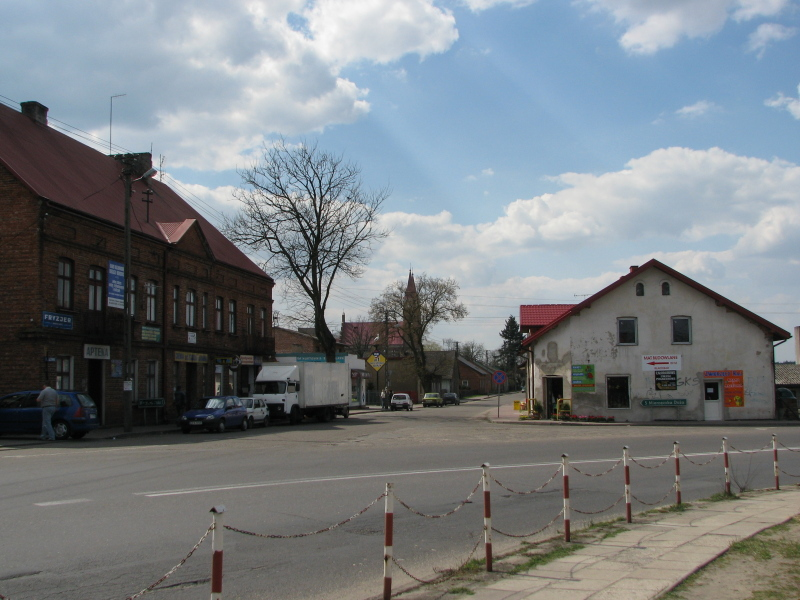

- Coat of arms
- Interactive map of Gmina Dłutów
- Coordinates (Dłutów): 51°33′31″N 19°23′24″E
- Country: Poland
- Voivodeship: Łódź
- County: Pabianice
- Seat: Dłutów

Area
  - Total: 100.47 km^{2} (38.79 sq mi)

Population (2006)
  - Total: 4,167
  - Density: 41.48/km^{2} (107.4/sq mi)
- Time zone: UTC+1 (CET)
  - Summer (DST): UTC+2 (CEST)
- Website: www.dlutow.pl/joomla/index.php

Gmina Dłutów is a rural gmina (administrative district) in Pabianice County, Łódź Voivodeship, in central Poland. Its seat is the village of Dłutów, which lies approximately 11 kilometres (7 mi) south of Pabianice and 26 km (16 mi) south of the regional capital Łódź.

The gmina covers an area of 100.47 square kilometres (38.8 sq mi), and as of 2006 its total population is 4,167.

== Villages ==
Gmina Dłutów contains the villages and settlements of:

- Budy Dłutowskie
- Czyżemin
- Dąbrowa
- Dłutów
- Dłutówek
- Drzewociny
- Huta Dłutowska
- Kociołki-Las
- Łaziska
- Lesieniec
- Leszczyny Duże
- Leszczyny Małe
- Mierzączka Duża
- Orzk
- Pawłówek
- Piętków
- Redociny
- Ślądkowice
- Stoczki-Porąbki
- Świerczyna
- Tążewy

== Neighbouring gminas ==
Gmina Dłutów is bordered by the gminas of Dobroń, Drużbice, Grabica, Pabianice, Tuszyn and Zelów.
