= Mierzączka Duża =

- Village
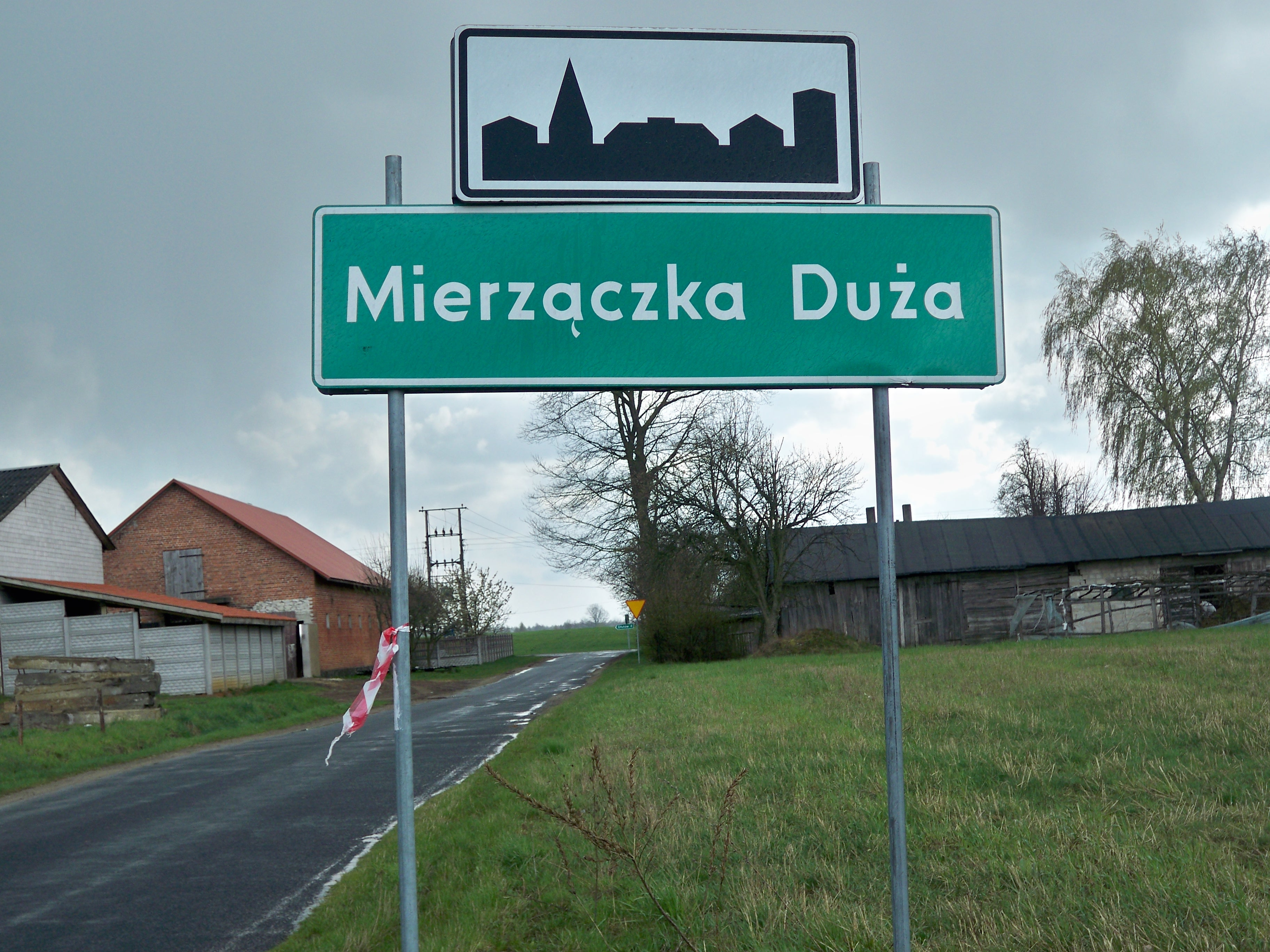

- Location within Poland
- Coordinates: 51°34′N 19°19′E
- Country: Poland
- Voivodeship: Łódź
- County: Pabianice
- Gmina: Dłutów
- Population (approx.): 190

Mierzączka Duża [mjɛˈʐɔnt͡ʂka ˈduʐa] is a village in the administrative district of Gmina Dłutów, within Pabianice County, Łódź Voivodeship, in central Poland.

The village has an approximate population of 190.
