= Gmina Miastko =

Gmina Miastko Miastko Commune
- Gmina
- Coat of arms
- Interactive map of Gmina Miastko
- Coordinates (Miastko): 54°1′N 16°59′E
- Country: Poland
- Voivodeship: Pomeranian
- County: Bytów
- Seat: Miastko

Area
  - Total: 466.82 km^{2} (180.24 sq mi)

Population (2006)
  - Total: 19,765
  - Density: 42.340/km^{2} (109.66/sq mi)
  - Urban: 10,987
  - Rural: 8,778
- Website: http://www.miastko.pl/

Gmina Miastko is an urban-rural gmina (administrative district) in Bytów County, Pomeranian Voivodeship, in northern Poland. Its seat is the town of Miastko, which lies approximately 37 kilometres (23 mi) west of Bytów and 115 km (71 mi) west of the regional capital Gdańsk.

The gmina covers an area of 466.82 square kilometres (180.2 sq mi), and as of 2006 its total population is 19,765 (out of which the population of Miastko amounts to 10,987, and the population of the rural part of the gmina is 8,778).

== Villages ==
Gmina Miastko contains the villages and settlements of Biała, Białuń, Bobięcino, Borzykowo, Byczyna, Chlebowo, Cicholas, Cieszanowo, Cisy, Czarnica, Dolsko, Domanice, Dretynek, Dretyń, Gatka, Głodowo, Gołębsko, Gomole, Grądzień, Jeżewsko, Kamnica, Kawcze, Kawczyn, Klewno, Kołacin, Kowalewice, Krzeszewo, Kwisno, Lipczyno, Lubkowo, Łaziska, Łąkoć, Łodzierz, Łosośniki, Malęcino, Męciny, Miłocice, Obrowo, Okunino, Olszewiec, Ostrowo, Pasieka, Piaszczyna, Ponikła, Popowice, Potok, Potok-Młyn, Pożyczki, Przemkowo, Przeradz, Przęsin, Role, Słosinko, Stachowo, Studnica, Szydlice, Świerzenko, Świerznik, Świerzno, Świeszynko, Świeszyno, Toczeń, Trzcinno, Trzebieszyno, Turowo, Tursko, Wałdowo, Węglewo, Węgorzynko, Wiatrołom, Wołcza Mała, Wołcza Wielka, Zadry, Zajączkowo, Znakowo, Żabno and Żarna.

== Neighbouring gminas ==
Gmina Miastko is bordered by the gminas of Biały Bór, Kępice, Koczała, Kołczygłowy, Lipnica, Polanów, Trzebielino and Tuchomie.
