= Wałdowo, Pomeranian Voivodeship =

Wałdowo
- Village
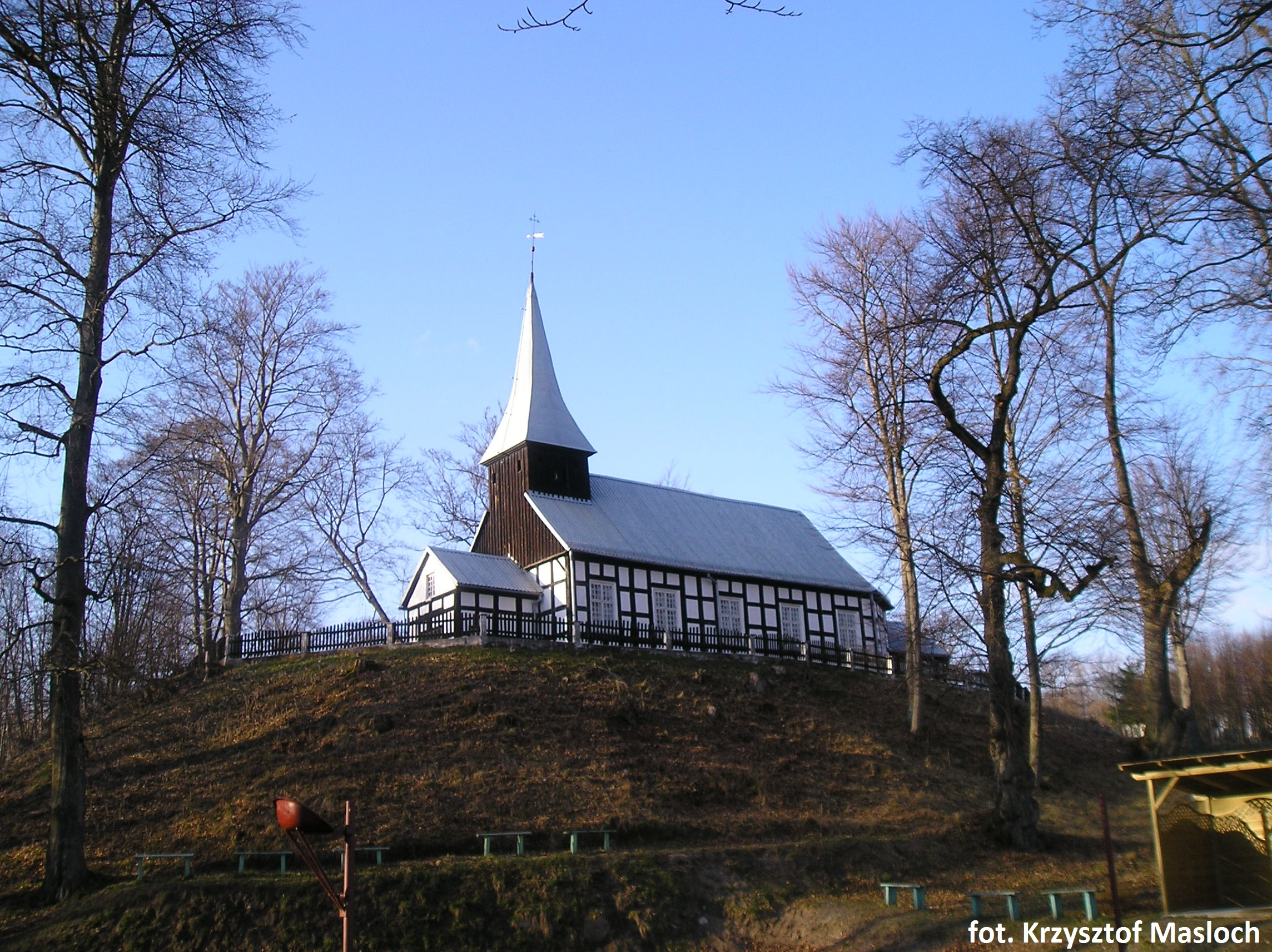
- Saint Stanislaus Kostka Church in Wałdowo

- Location within Poland
- Coordinates: 54°03′35″N 17°09′33″E
- Country: Poland
- Voivodeship: Pomeranian
- County: Bytów
- Gmina: Miastko
- Population: 249

Wałdowo [vau̯ˈdɔvɔ] is a village in Gmina Miastko, Bytów County, Pomeranian Voivodeship, in northern Poland. Wałdowo lies in a forested area. The nearest city is Miastko, 13 km (8 mi) to the west.

From 1975 to 1998 the village was in Słupsk Voivodeship.
