= Czarnica =

- Village
- Location within Poland
- Coordinates: 54°04′33″N 17°09′40″E
- Country: Poland
- Voivodeship: (Pomeranian Voivodeship) Pomeranian
- County: Bytów County
- Gmina: Miastko
- Population: 153

Czarnica [t͡ʂarˈnit͡sa] is a village in Gmina Miastko, Bytów County, Pomeranian Voivodeship, in northern Poland, on the border with West Pomeranian Voivodeship.

From 1975 to 1998 the village was in Słupsk Voivodeship.
