= Huta Dłutowska =

- Village
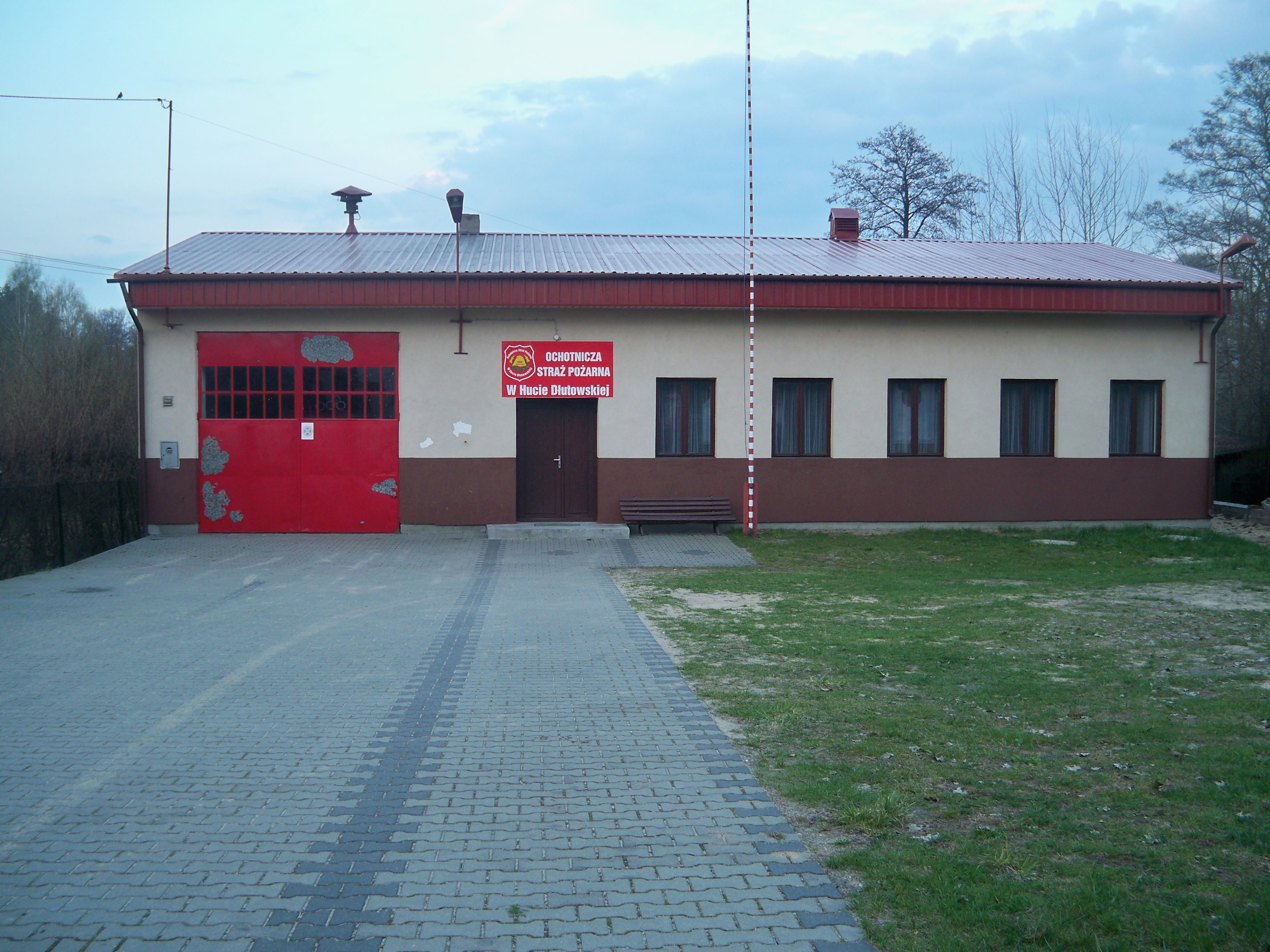
- Fire station

- Location within Poland
- Coordinates: 51°36′0″N 19°23′0″E
- Country: Poland
- Voivodeship: Łódź
- County: Pabianice
- Gmina: Dłutów
- Elevation: 206 m (676 ft)
- Population: 220

Huta Dłutowska [ˈxuta dwuˈtɔfska] is a village in the administrative district of Gmina Dłutów, within Pabianice County, Łódź Voivodeship, in central Poland.

== Famous people ==
- Janusz Bolonek, bishop and nuncio
