= Wołcza Mała =

- Village
- Location within Poland
- Coordinates: 53°58′34″N 16°56′45″E
- Country: Poland
- Voivodeship: Pomeranian
- County: Bytów
- Gmina: Miastko
- Population: 139

Wołcza Mała [ˈvɔu̯t͡ʂa ˈmawa] (German: Klein Volz) is a village in Gmina Miastko, Bytów County, Pomeranian Voivodeship, in northern Poland.

From 1975 to 1998 the village was in Słupsk Voivodeship.

== Transport ==
Wołcza Mała lies along the national road.
