= Kowalewice, Pomeranian Voivodeship =

Kowalewice
- Village
- Location within Poland
- Coordinates: 54°03′59″N 16°58′50″E
- Country: Poland
- Voivodeship: Pomeranian
- County: Bytów
- Gmina: Miastko
- Sołectwo: Kowalewice-Okunino
- Population: 41

Kowalewice [kɔvalɛˈvit͡sɛ] (German: Julienhof) is a village in Gmina Miastko, Bytów County, Pomeranian Voivodeship, in northern Poland, on the border with West Pomeranian Voivodeship.

From 1975 to 1998 the village was in Słupsk Voivodeship.

== Transport ==
Kowalewice lies along the national road.
