= Trzcinno, Pomeranian Voivodeship =

Trzcinno
- Village
- Location within Poland
- Coordinates: 54°05′17″N 17°04′05″E
- Country: Poland
- Voivodeship: Pomeranian
- County: Bytów
- Gmina: Miastko
- Sołectwo: Trzcinno-Dretynek
- Population: 327

Trzcinno [ˈtʂt͡ɕinnɔ] is a village in Gmina Miastko, Bytów County, Pomeranian Voivodeship, in northern Poland.

From 1975 to 1998 the village was in Słupsk Voivodeship.
