= Słosinko =

- Village
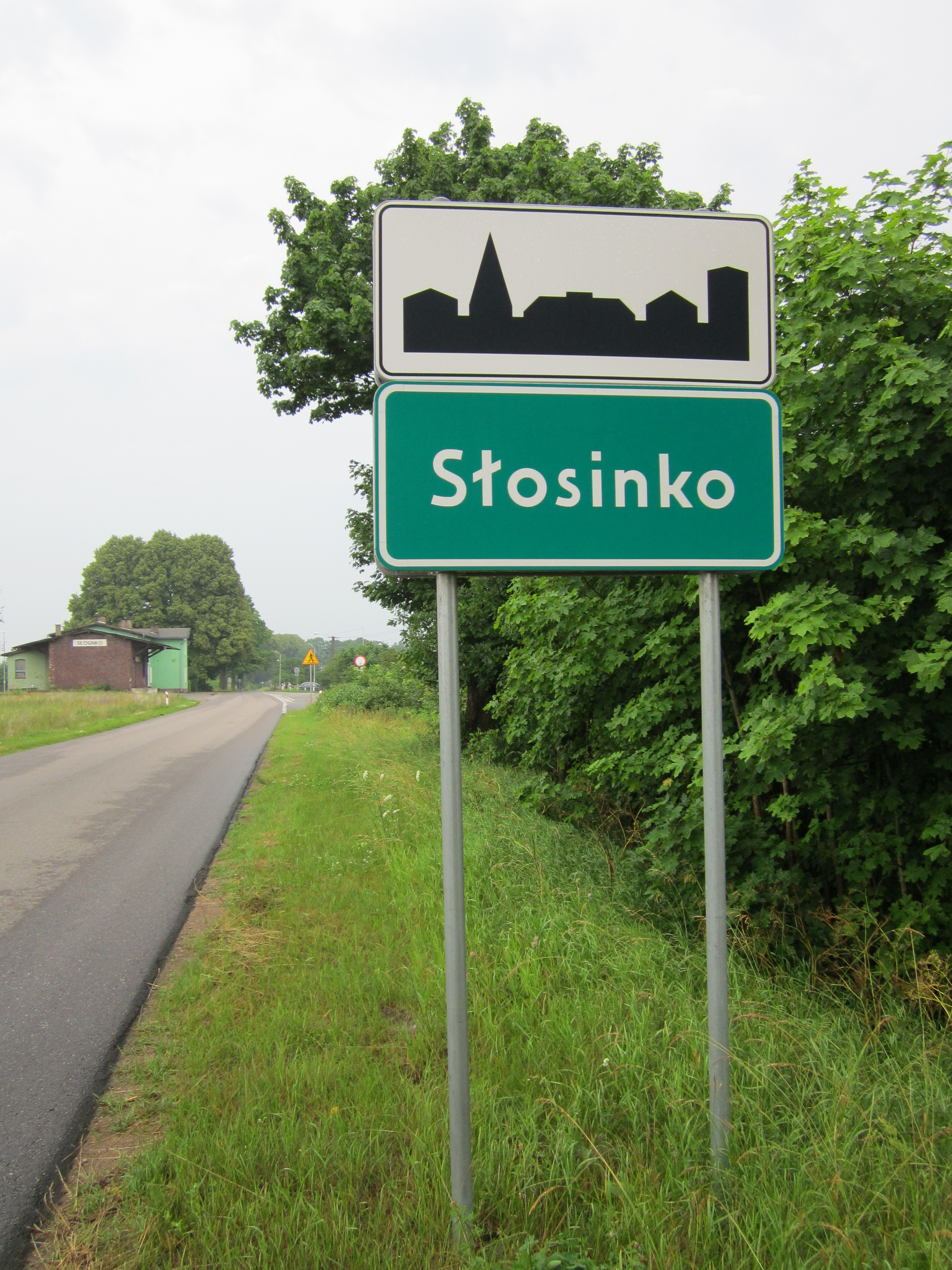

- Location within Poland
- Coordinates: 53°56′33″N 16°58′59″E
- Country: Poland
- Voivodeship: Pomeranian
- County: Bytów
- Gmina: Miastko
- Elevation: 185 m (607 ft)
- Population: 674

Słosinko [swɔˈɕiŋkɔ] is a village in Gmina Miastko, Bytów County, Pomeranian Voivodeship, in northern Poland, on the border with West Pomeranian Voivodeship.

From 1975 to 1998 the village was in Słupsk Voivodeship.

== Transport ==
In Słosinko there is a PKP railway station.

== See also ==
- Słosinko (PKP station)
