= Dretyń =

- Village
- Location within Poland
- Coordinates: 54°06′16″N 16°58′56″E
- Country: Poland
- Voivodeship: Pomeranian
- County: Bytów
- Gmina: Miastko
- Population: 1,123

Dretyń [ˈdrɛtɨɲ] (German: Treten) is a village in Gmina Miastko, Bytów County, Pomeranian Voivodeship, in northern Poland.

From 1975 to 1998 the village was in Słupsk Voivodeship.

== Transport ==
Dretyń lies along the national road.
