= Węgorzynko =

- Village
- Location within Poland
- Coordinates: 54°02′12″N 17°00′11″E
- Country: Poland
- Voivodeship: Pomeranian
- County: Bytów
- Gmina: Miastko
- Population: 153

Węgorzynko [vɛŋɡɔˈʐɨŋkɔ] is a village in Gmina Miastko, Bytów County, Pomeranian Voivodeship, in northern Poland.

From 1975 to 1998 the village was in Słupsk Voivodeship.
