= Zlátenka =

- Municipality
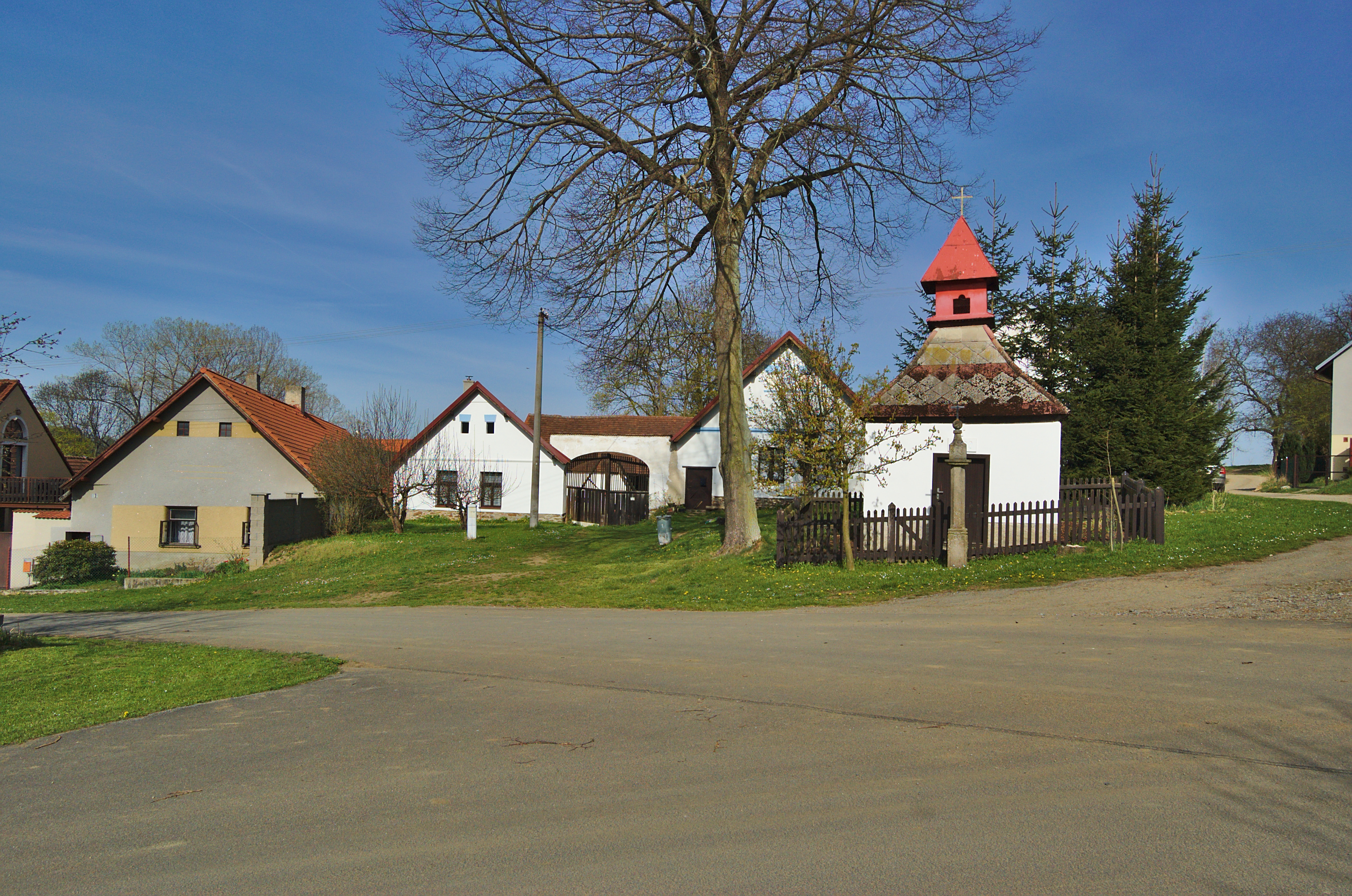
- Centre of Zlátenka with the chapel

- Location in the Czech Republic
- Coordinates: 49°25′25″N 15°3′31″E
- Country: Czech Republic
- Region: Vysočina
- District: Pelhřimov
- First mentioned: 1362

Area
  - Total: 2.38 km^{2} (0.92 sq mi)
- Elevation: 602 m (1,975 ft)

Population (2026-01-01)
  - Total: 46
  - Density: 19/km^{2} (50/sq mi)
- Time zone: UTC+1 (CET)
  - Summer (DST): UTC+2 (CEST)
- Postal code: 395 01
- Website: www.zlatenka.cz

Zlátenka is a municipality and village in Pelhřimov District in the Vysočina Region of the Czech Republic. It has about 50 inhabitants.

Zlátenka lies approximately 11 kilometres (7 mi) west of Pelhřimov, 38 km (24 mi) west of Jihlava, and 87 km (54 mi) south-east of Prague.

== Demographics ==
Historical population
Year	Pop.	±%
1869	123	—
1880	158	+28.5%
1890	147	−7.0%
1900	137	−6.8%
1910	131	−4.4%
1921	138	+5.3%
1930	118	−14.5%
1950	74	−37.3%
1961	65	−12.2%
1970	52	−20.0%
1980	50	−3.8%
1991	35	−30.0%
2001	44	+25.7%
2011	46	+4.5%
2021	43	−6.5%
Source: Censuses
