= Pasieka, Pomeranian Voivodeship =

Pasieka
- Village
- Location within Poland
- Coordinates: 53°59′15″N 16°57′54″E
- Country: Poland
- Voivodeship: Pomeranian
- County: Bytów
- Gmina: Miastko
- Population: 486

Pasieka [paˈɕɛka] is a village in Gmina Miastko, Bytów County, Pomeranian Voivodeship, in northern Poland.

From 1975 to 1998 the village was in Słupsk Voivodeship.

== Transport ==
Pasieka lies along the national road.
