= Dretynek =

- Village
- Location within Poland
- Coordinates: 54°02′59″N 17°01′26″E
- Country: Poland
- Voivodeship: Pomeranian
- County: Bytów
- Gmina: Miastko
- Sołectwo: Dretynek-Trzcinno
- Population: 121

Dretynek [drɛˈtɨnɛk] (German: Tretenwalde) is a village in Gmina Miastko, Bytów County, Pomeranian Voivodeship, in northern Poland.

From 1975 to 1998 the village was in Słupsk Voivodeship.
