= Bobięcino =

- Village
- Location within Poland
- Coordinates: 54°01′06″N 16°49′50″E
- Country: Poland
- Voivodeship: Pomeranian
- County: Bytów
- Gmina: Miastko
- Population (2006): 113

Bobięcino [bɔbjɛnˈt͡ɕinɔ] (German: Papenzin) is a village in Gmina Miastko, Bytów County, Pomeranian Voivodeship, in northern Poland.

From 1975 to 1998 the village was in Słupsk Voivodeship.
