= Żabno, Bytów County =

Żabno
- Village
- Location within Poland
- Coordinates: 54°06′23″N 17°07′46″E
- Country: Poland
- Voivodeship: Pomeranian
- County: Bytów
- Gmina: Miastko
- Sołectwo: Role-Żabno
- Population: 87

Żabno [ˈʐabnɔ] (Kashubian: Żabno) is a village in Gmina Miastko, Bytów County, Pomeranian Voivodeship, in northern Poland.

From 1975 to 1998 the village was in Słupsk Voivodeship.
