= Kamnica, Poland =

Kamnica
- Village
- Location within Poland
- Coordinates: 54°01′04″N 16°53′23″E
- Country: Poland
- Voivodeship: Pomeranian
- County: Bytów
- Gmina: Miastko
- Population: 373

Kamnica [kamˈnit͡sa] is a village in Gmina Miastko, Bytów County, Pomeranian Voivodeship, in northern Poland.

From 1975 to 1998 the village was in Słupsk Voivodeship.
