= Role, Pomeranian Voivodeship =

Role
- Village
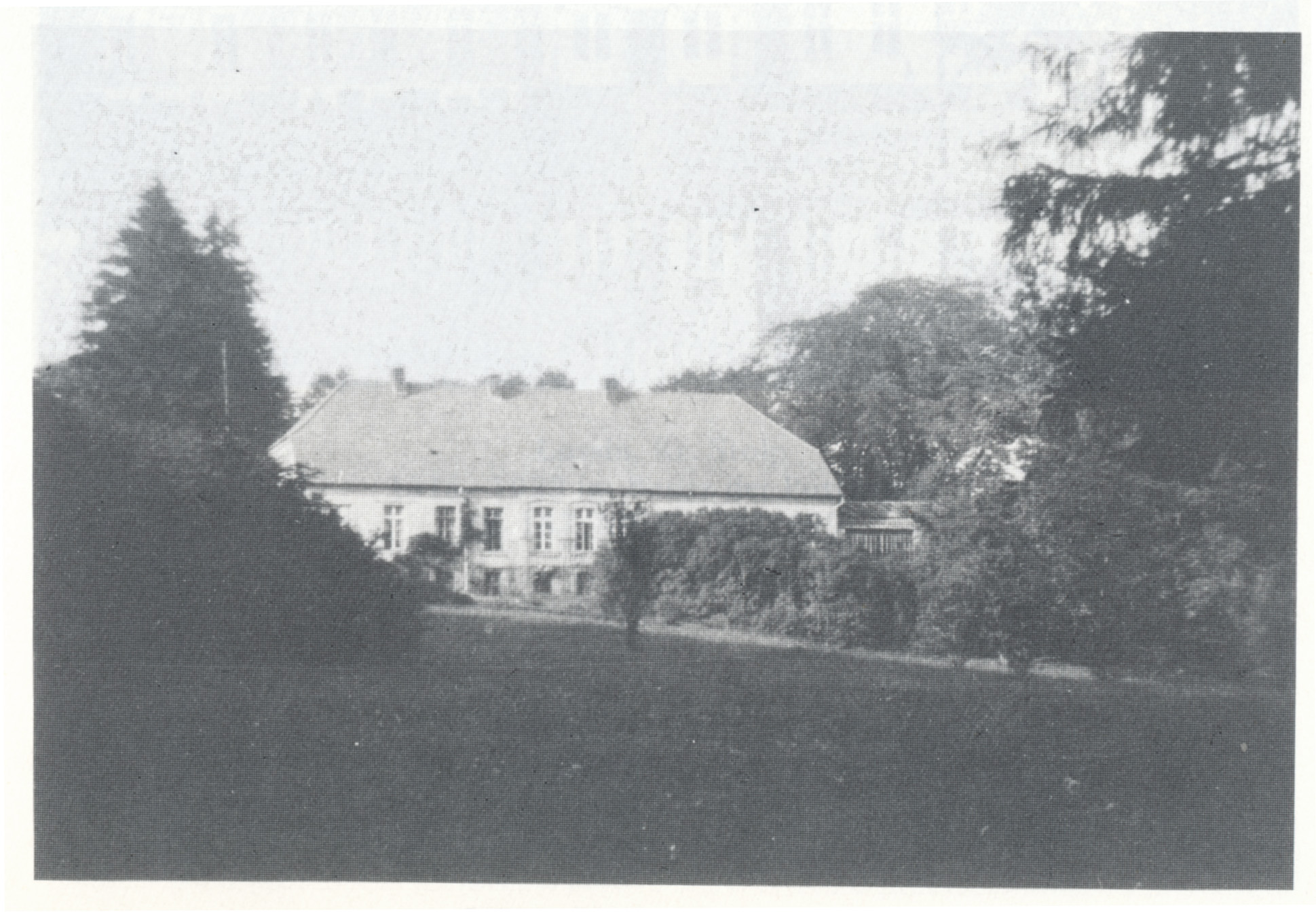
- Manor House of the Puttkamer family (1880)

- Location within Poland
- Coordinates: 54°06′45″N 17°08′45″E
- Country: Poland
- Voivodeship: Pomeranian
- County: Bytów
- Gmina: Miastko
- Sołectwo: Role-Żabno
- Population: 108

Role [ˈrɔlɛ] is a village in Gmina Miastko, Bytów County, Pomeranian Voivodeship, in northern Poland.

From 1975 to 1998 the village was in Słupsk Voivodeship.
