= Miłocice, Pomeranian Voivodeship =

Miłocice
- Village
- Location within Poland
- Coordinates: 53°57′22″N 16°56′08″E
- Country: Poland
- Voivodeship: Pomeranian
- County: Bytów
- Gmina: Miastko
- Population: 412

Miłocice [miwɔˈt͡ɕit͡sɛ] (German: Falkenhagen) is a village in Gmina Miastko, Bytów County, Pomeranian Voivodeship, in northern Poland.

For the history of the region, see History of Pomerania. From 1975 to 1998 the village was in Słupsk Voivodeship.

== Transport ==
Miłocice lies along the national road.
