= Wołcza Wielka =

- Village
- Location within Poland
- Coordinates: 53°59′29″N 16°55′34″E
- Country: Poland
- Voivodeship: Pomeranian
- County: Bytów
- Gmina: Miastko
- Population: 319

Wołcza Wielka [ˈvɔu̯t͡ʂa ˈvjɛlka] (German: Groß Volz) is a village in Gmina Miastko, Bytów County, Pomeranian Voivodeship, in northern Poland.

From 1975 to 1998 the village was in Słupsk Voivodeship.
