= Słupsk Voivodeship =

Former administrative division of Poland

Coordinates: 54°28′05″N 17°01′23″E

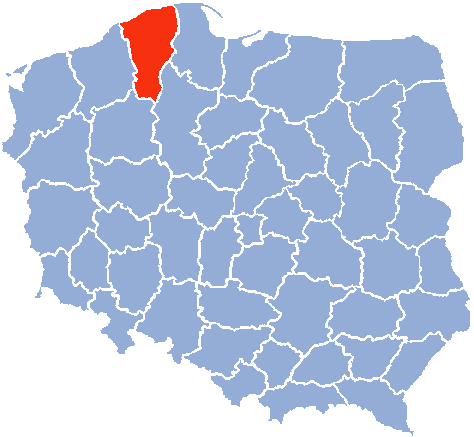
Słupsk Voivodeship

Słupsk Voivodeship (Polish: województwo słupskie) was a unit of administrative division and local government in Poland from 1975 to 1998, previously part of Szczecin Voivodeship (1945–50) and Koszalin Voivodeship (1950–75), superseded (since 1999) by Pomeranian Voivodeship and West Pomeranian Voivodeship (Sławno County). Its capital city was Słupsk.

== Statistics (1 January 1992) ==
- Area: 7,400 km^{2}
- Population: 413,800 inhabitants
- Population density: 56 inhabitants/km^{2}
- Administrative division: 31 communes
- Number of cities and towns (urban communes): 11

== Major cities and towns (population in 1995) ==
- Słupsk (102,700)
- Lębork (36,300)

== Other towns (population in 1980) ==
- Ustka (15,200)
- Bytów (13,300)
- Sławno (12,700)
- Człuchów (10,700)
- Miastko (10,000)

== See also ==
- Voivodeships of Poland
