= Zalew =

- Village
- Location within Poland
- Coordinates: 51°43′N 19°13′E
- Country: Poland
- Voivodeship: Łódź
- County: Pabianice
- Gmina: Lutomiersk

Zalew [ˈzalɛf] is a village in the administrative district of Gmina Lutomiersk, within Pabianice County, Łódź Voivodeship, in central Poland.

It lies approximately 4 km (2.5 mi) south of the center of Lutomiersk, the center of the gmina.
