= Ksawerów (disambiguation) =

Ksawerów is a neighborhood in the Mokotów district of Warsaw, Poland.

Ksawerów may also refer to:

- Ksawerów, Kalisz County in Greater Poland Voivodeship (west-central Poland)
- Ksawerów, Konin County in Greater Poland Voivodeship (west-central Poland)
- Ksawerów, Września County in Greater Poland Voivodeship (west-central Poland)
- Ksawerów, Łęczyca County in Łódź Voivodeship (central Poland)
- Ksawerów, Łódź East County in Łódź Voivodeship (central Poland)
- Ksawerów, Pajęczno County in Łódź Voivodeship (central Poland)
- Ksawerów, Pabianice County in Łódź Voivodeship (central Poland)
  - Gmina Ksawerów, a rural gmina
- Ksawerów, Lower Silesian Voivodeship (south-west Poland)
- Ksawerów, Lublin Voivodeship (east Poland)
- Ksawerów, Świętokrzyskie Voivodeship (south-central Poland)
