= Malanowski =

Malanowski (feminine Malanowska) is a Polish surname, denoting a person from the village of Malanów. Notable people include:

- Feliks Malanowski, Polish athlete
- Thaddeus F. Malanowski, American Catholic priest
