= Szydłówek =

Szydłówek may refer to the following places:

- Szydłówek, Łódź Voivodeship (central Poland)
- Szydłówek, Mława County in Masovian Voivodeship (east-central Poland)
- Szydłówek, Szydłowiec County in Masovian Voivodeship (east-central Poland)
