= Bechcice Kolonia =

- Village
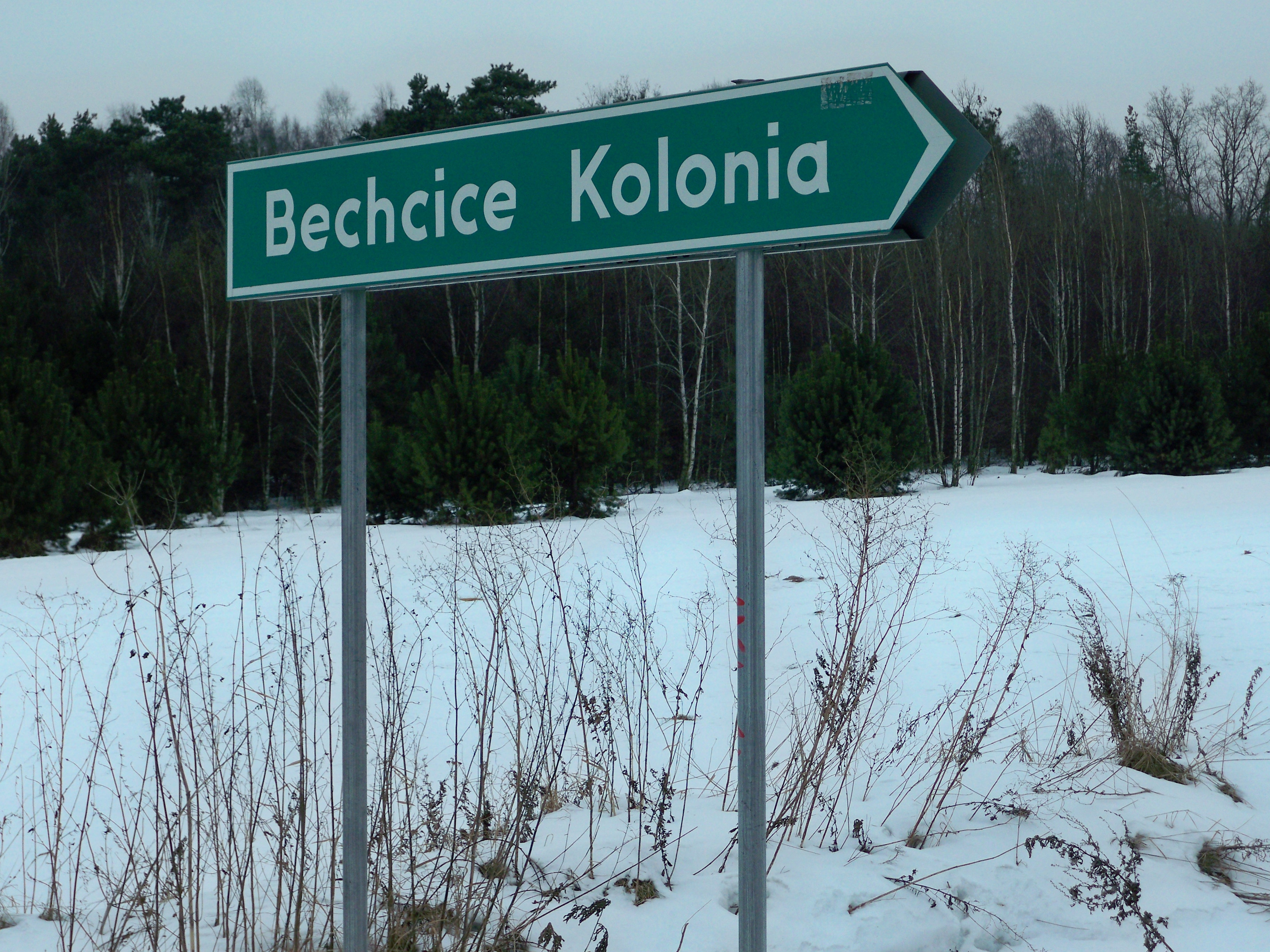

- Location within Poland
- Coordinates: 51°44′56″N 19°15′26″E
- Country: Poland
- Voivodeship: Łódź
- County: Pabianice
- Gmina: Lutomiersk
- Population: 280

Bechcice Kolonia [kɔˈlɔɲa bɛxˈt͡ɕit͡sɛ] is a village in the administrative district of Gmina Lutomiersk, within Pabianice County, Łódź Voivodeship, in central Poland.
