= Kolonia Wola Zaradzyńska =

- Village
- Location within Poland
- Coordinates: 51°39′56″N 19°24′36″E
- Country: Poland
- Voivodeship: Łódź
- County: Pabianice
- Gmina: Ksawerów

Kolonia Wola Zaradzyńska [kɔˈlɔɲa ˈvɔla zaraˈd͡zɨɲska] is a village in the administrative district of Gmina Ksawerów, within Pabianice County, Łódź Voivodeship, in central Poland.
