= Jerwonice =

- Village
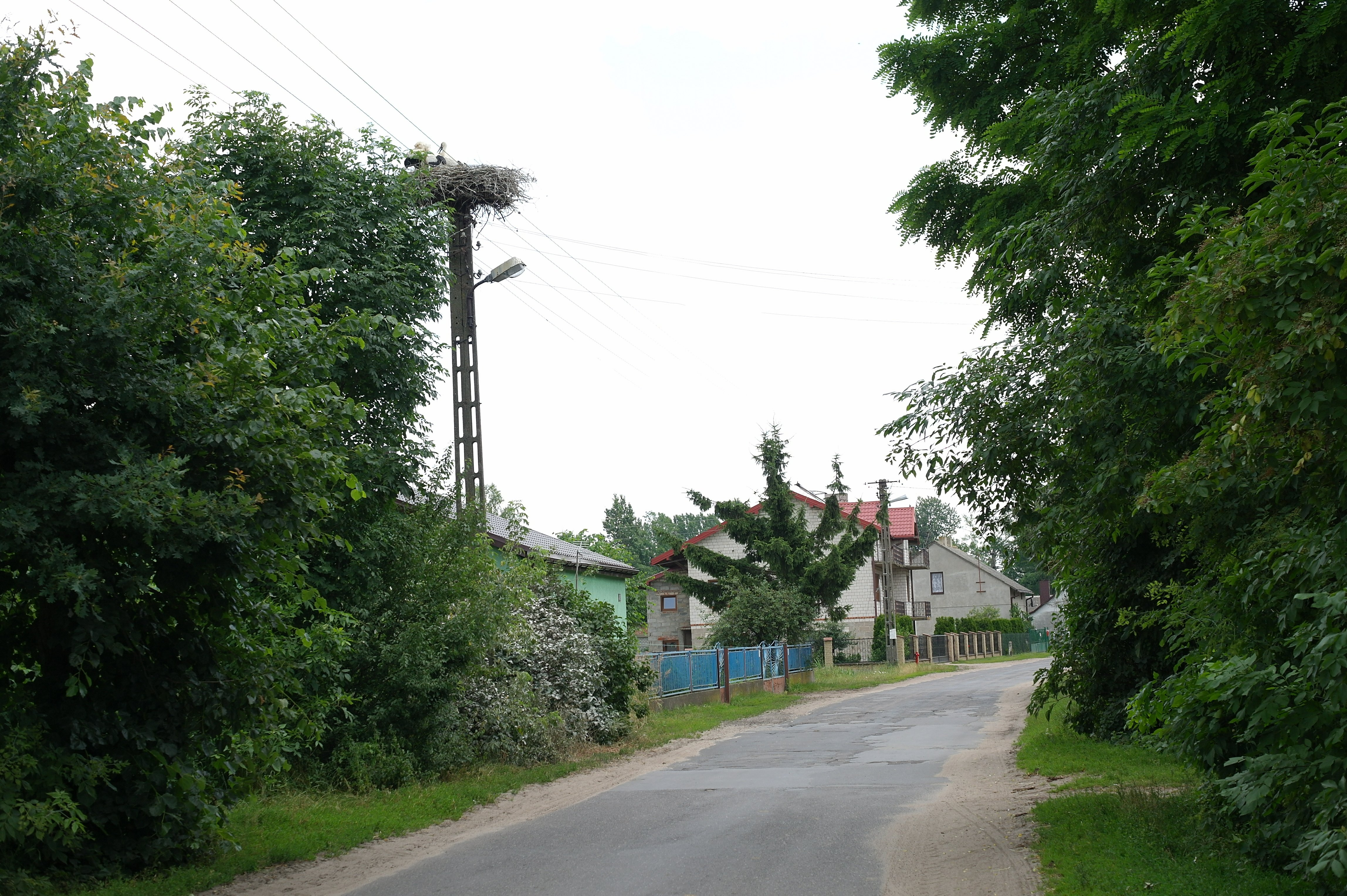

- Location within Poland
- Coordinates: 51°47′N 19°7′E
- Country: Poland
- Voivodeship: Łódź
- County: Pabianice
- Gmina: Lutomiersk

Jerwonice [jɛrvɔˈnit͡sɛ] is a village in the administrative district of Gmina Lutomiersk, within Pabianice County, Łódź Voivodeship, in central Poland.
