= Bechcice-Wieś =

- Village
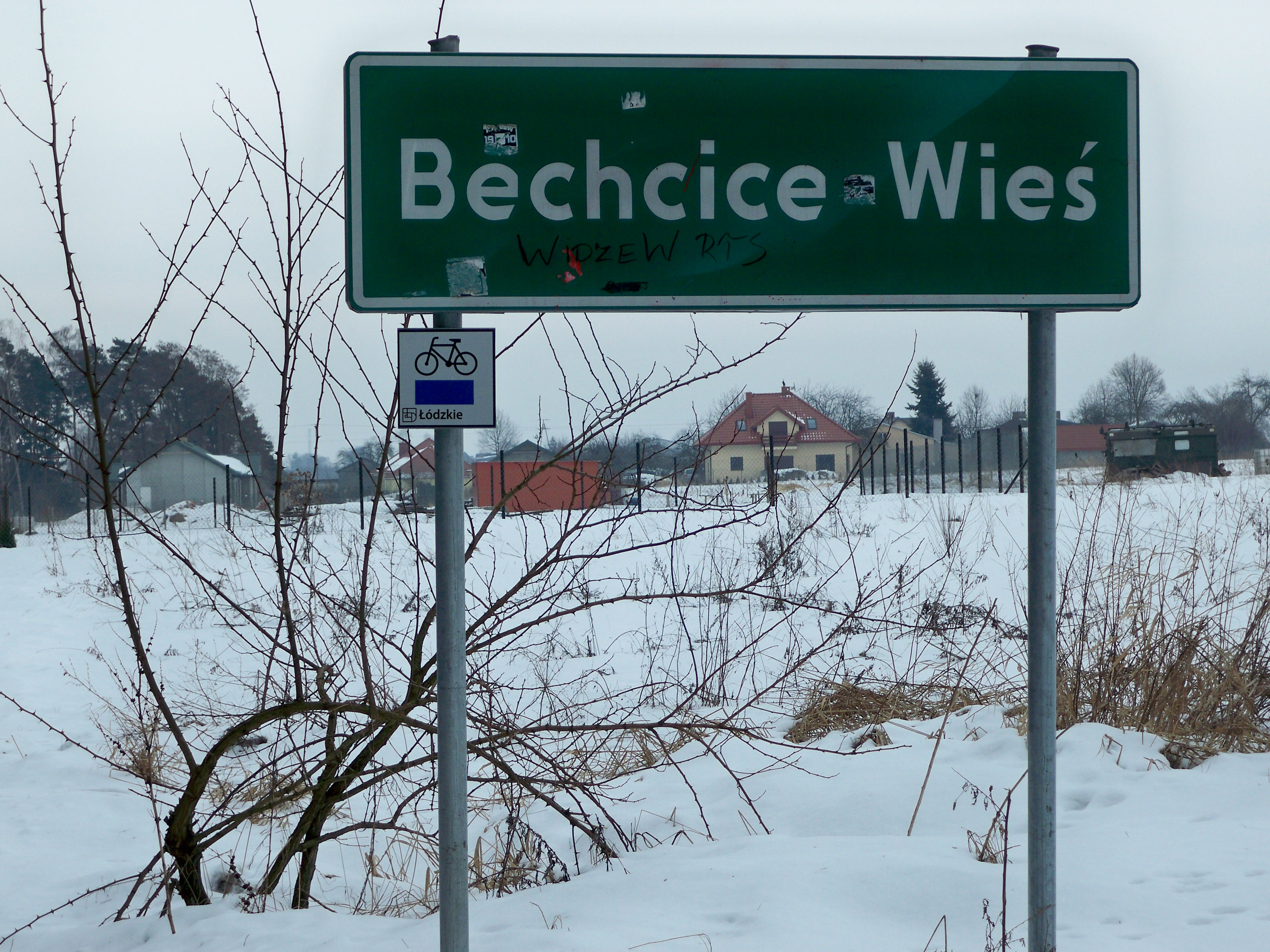

- Location within Poland
- Coordinates: 51°44′34″N 19°16′41″E
- Country: Poland
- Voivodeship: Łódź
- County: Pabianice
- Gmina: Lutomiersk

Bechcice-Wieś [bɛxˈt͡ɕit͡sɛ ˈvjɛɕ] is a village in the administrative district of Gmina Lutomiersk, within Pabianice County, Łódź Voivodeship, in central Poland.
