= Szydłów (disambiguation) =

Szydłów is a town in Świętokrzyskie Voivodeship, south-central Poland.

Szydłów may also refer to:

- Polish name for Šiluva in Lithuania
- Szydłów, Pabianice County in Łódź Voivodeship (central Poland)
- Szydłów, Piotrków County in Łódź Voivodeship (central Poland)
- Szydłów, Lubusz Voivodeship (west Poland)
- Szydłów, Opole Voivodeship (south Poland)
