= Puczniew =

- Village
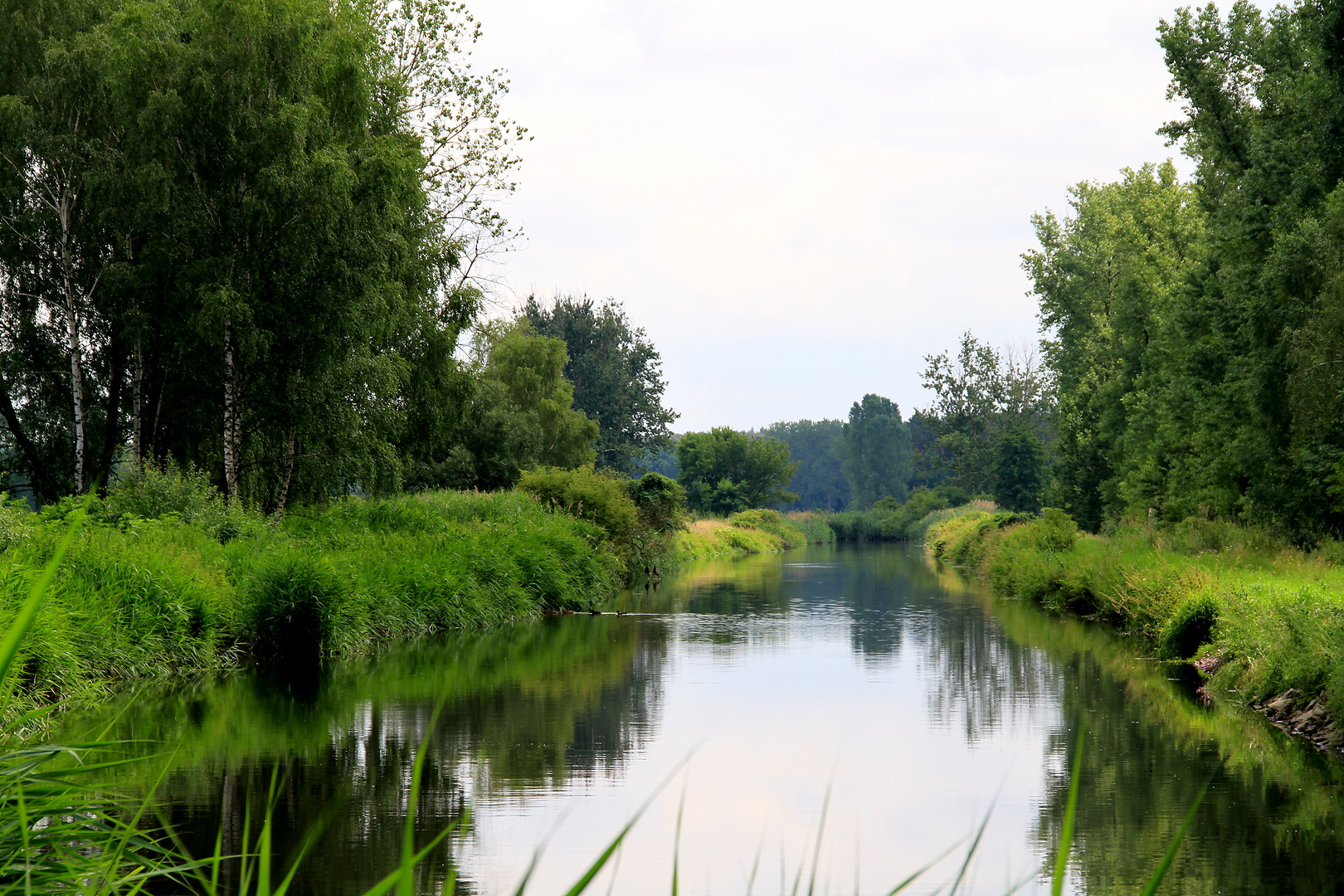

- Location within Poland
- Coordinates: 51°47′N 19°4′E
- Country: Poland
- Voivodeship: Łódź
- County: Pabianice
- Gmina: Lutomiersk
- Website: http://puczniew.w.interia.pl/puczniew.htm

Puczniew [ˈput͡ʂɲɛf] is a village in the administrative district of Gmina Lutomiersk, within Pabianice County, Łódź Voivodeship, in central Poland.
