= Antoniew, Pabianice County =

Antoniew
- Village
- Location within Poland
- Coordinates: 51°45′12″N 19°9′58″E
- Country: Poland
- Voivodeship: Łódź
- County: Pabianice
- Gmina: Lutomiersk
- Population: 70

Antoniew [anˈtɔɲɛf] is a village in the administrative district of Gmina Lutomiersk, within Pabianice County, Łódź Voivodeship, in central Poland.
