= Zdziechów Nowy =

- Village
- Location within Poland
- Coordinates: 51°47′22″N 19°11′41″E
- Country: Poland
- Voivodeship: Łódź
- County: Pabianice
- Gmina: Lutomiersk
- Population: 30

Zdziechów Nowy [ˈzd͡ʑɛxuf ˈnɔvɨ] is a village in the administrative district of Gmina Lutomiersk, within Pabianice County, Łódź Voivodeship, in central Poland.

From 1975 to 1998, the town belonged administratively to the Sieradz Voivodship.
