= Babiczki =

- Village
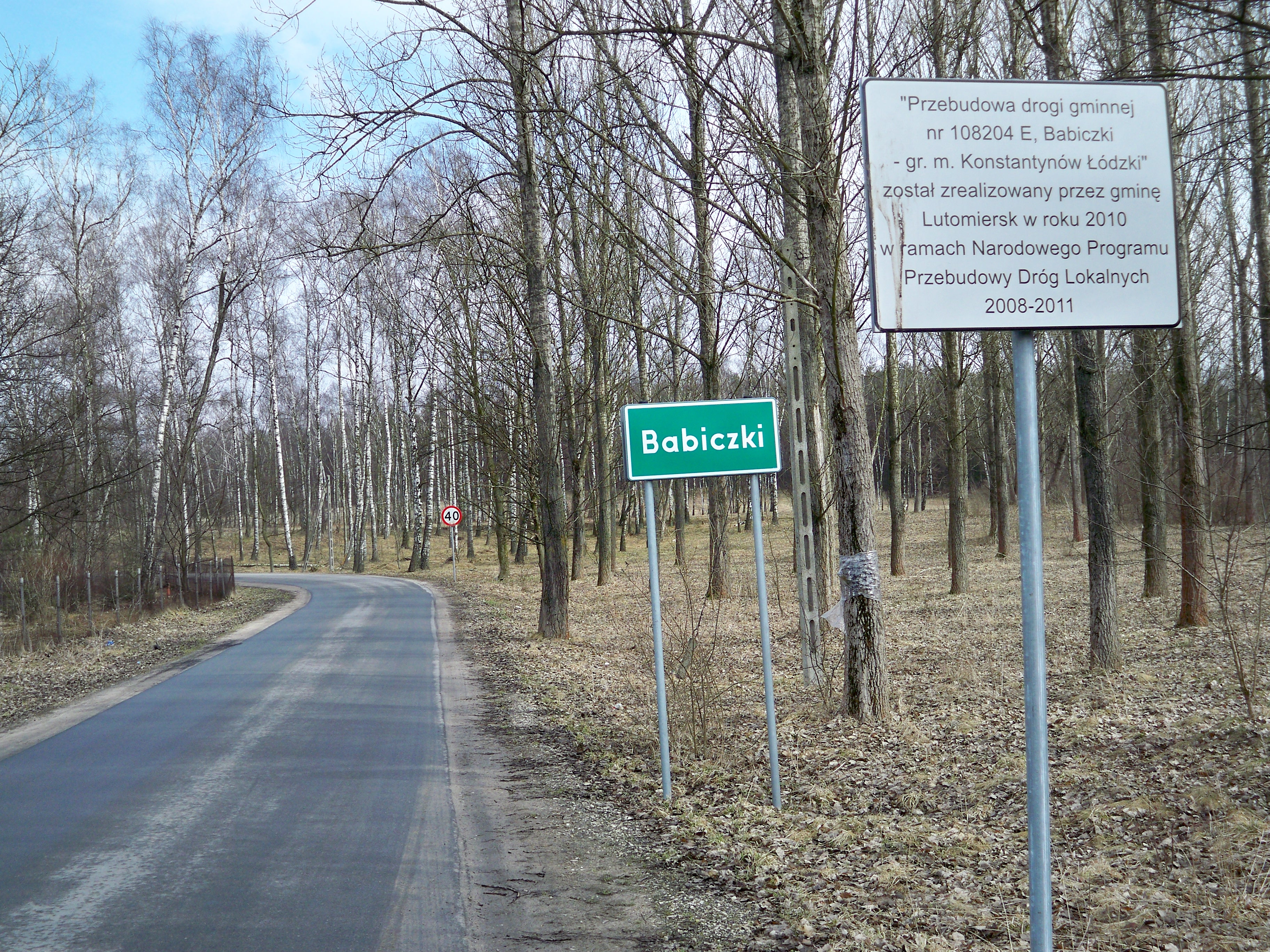

- Location within Poland
- Coordinates: 51°46′55″N 19°15′21″E
- Country: Poland
- Voivodeship: Łódź
- County: Pabianice
- Gmina: Lutomiersk

Babiczki [baˈbit͡ʂki] is a village in the administrative district of Gmina Lutomiersk, within Pabianice County, Łódź Voivodeship, in central Poland.
