= Legendzin =

- Village
- Location within Poland
- Coordinates: 51°43′56″N 19°14′1″E
- Country: Poland
- Voivodeship: Łódź
- County: Pabianice
- Gmina: Lutomiersk
- Population: 90

Legendzin [lɛˈɡɛnd͡ʑin] is a village in the administrative district of Gmina Lutomiersk, within Pabianice County, Łódź Voivodeship, in central Poland.
