= Zygmuntów, Pabianice County =

Zygmuntów
- Village
- Location within Poland
- Coordinates: 51°47′26″N 19°05′16″E
- Country: Poland
- Voivodeship: Łódź
- County: Pabianice
- Gmina: Lutomiersk

Zygmuntów [zɨɡˈmuntuf] is a village in the administrative district of Gmina Lutomiersk, within Pabianice County, Łódź Voivodeship, in central Poland.
