= Wygoda Mikołajewska =

- Village
- Location within Poland
- Coordinates: 51°43′42″N 19°12′21″E
- Country: Poland
- Voivodeship: Łódź
- County: Pabianice
- Gmina: Lutomiersk
- Population: 70

Wygoda Mikołajewska [vɨˈɡɔda mikɔwaˈjɛfska] is a village in the administrative district of Gmina Lutomiersk, within Pabianice County, Łódź Voivodeship, in central Poland.
