= Jeziorko, Pabianice County =

Jeziorko
- Village
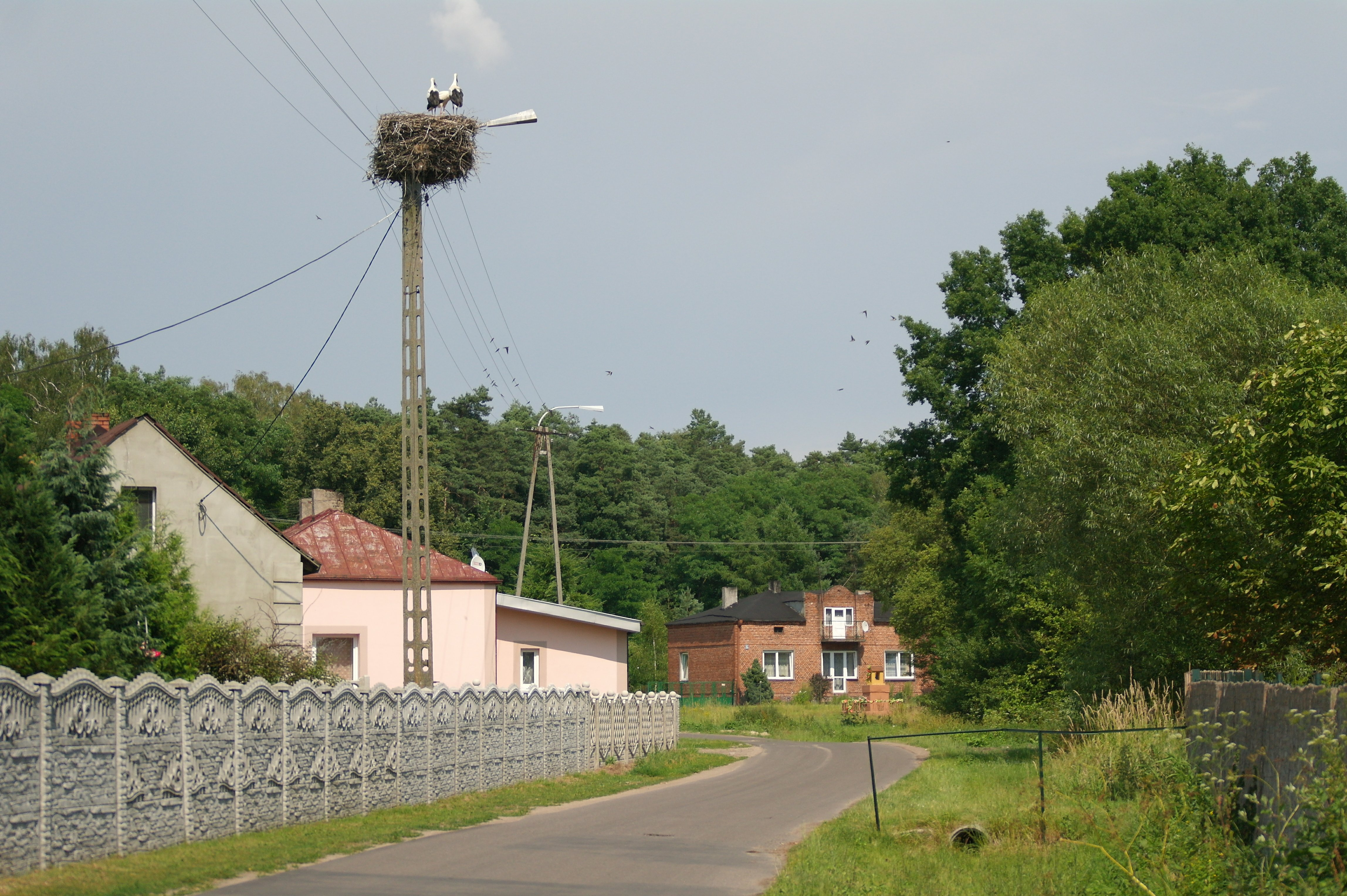

- Location within Poland
- Coordinates: 51°47′46″N 19°1′53″E
- Country: Poland
- Voivodeship: Łódź
- County: Pabianice
- Gmina: Lutomiersk

Jeziorko [jɛˈʑɔrkɔ] is a village in the administrative district of Gmina Lutomiersk, within Pabianice County, Łódź Voivodeship, in central Poland.
