= Zdziechów-Kolonia =

- Village
- Location within Poland
- Coordinates: 51°46′56″N 19°11′16″E
- Country: Poland
- Voivodeship: Łódź
- County: Pabianice
- Gmina: Lutomiersk

Zdziechów-Kolonia [ˈzd͡ʑɛxuf kɔˈlɔɲa] is a village in Gmina Lutomiersk, within Pabianice County, Łódź Voivodeship, in central Poland.
