= Kazimierz, Pabianice County =

Kazimierz
- Village
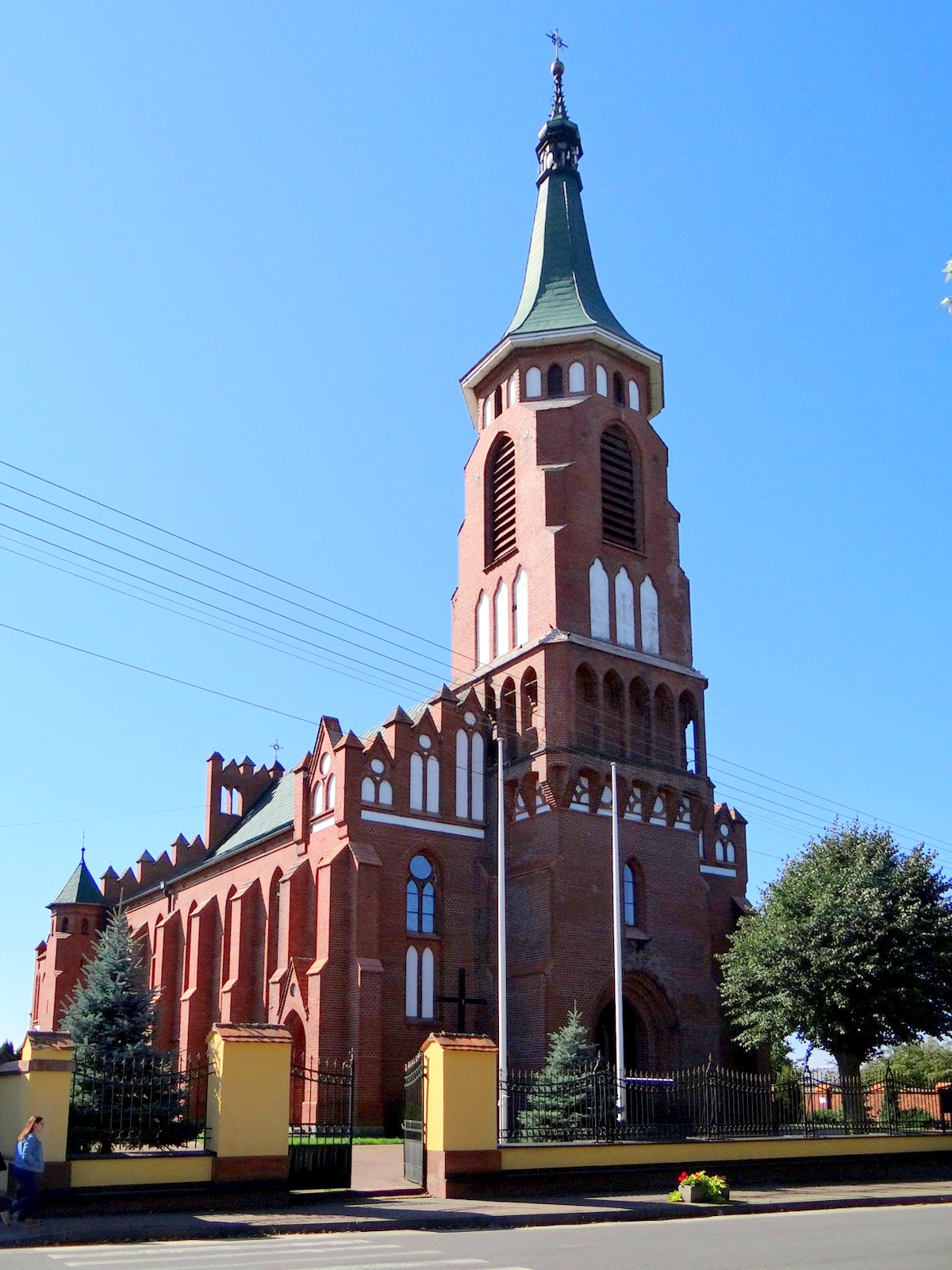
- Church of Saint John the Baptist in Kazimierz

- Location within Poland
- Coordinates: 51°46′7″N 19°12′19″E
- Country: Poland
- Voivodeship: Łódź
- County: Pabianice
- Gmina: Lutomiersk
- Time zone: UTC+1 (CET)
  - Summer (DST): UTC+2 (CEST)
- Vehicle registration: EPA

Kazimierz (Polish pronunciation: [kaˈʑimjɛʂ]) is a village in the administrative district of Gmina Lutomiersk, within Pabianice County, Łódź Voivodeship, in central Poland.

It was a private church town, administratively located in the Łęczyca County in the Łęczyca Voivodeship in the Greater Poland Province of the Kingdom of Poland.
