= Gmina Lutomiersk =

Gmina Lutomiersk Lutomiersk Commune
- Gmina
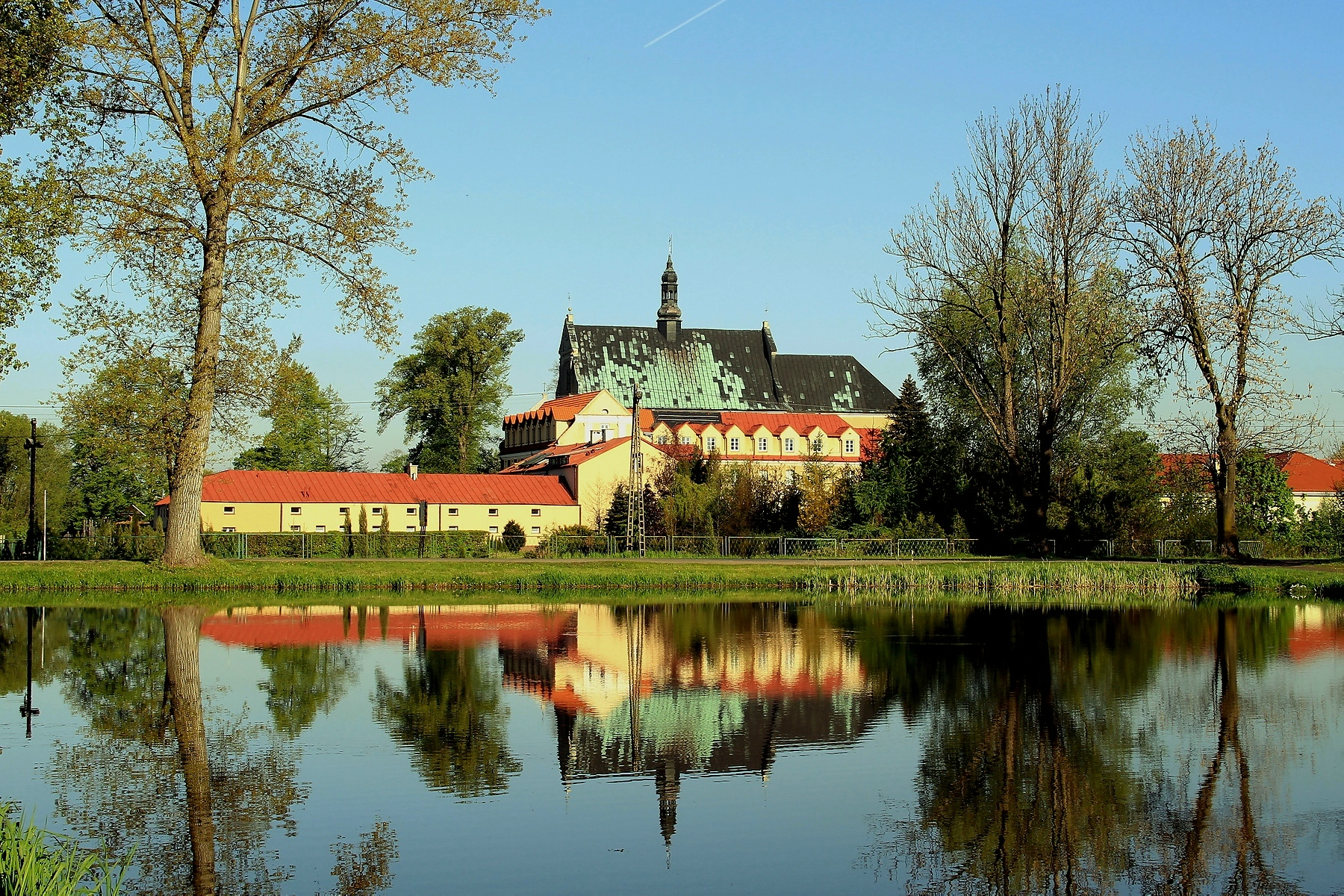

- Flag Coat of arms
- Interactive map of Gmina Lutomiersk
- Coordinates (Lutomiersk): 51°45′N 19°12′E
- Country: Poland
- Voivodeship: Łódź
- County: Pabianice
- Seat: Lutomiersk

Area
  - Total: 133.87 km^{2} (51.69 sq mi)

Population (2006)
  - Total: 7,090
  - Density: 53.0/km^{2} (137/sq mi)
- Website: www.lutomiersk.pl

Gmina Lutomiersk is a rural gmina (administrative district) in Pabianice County, Łódź Voivodeship, in central Poland. Its seat is the town of Lutomiersk, which lies approximately 17 kilometres (11 mi) north-west of Pabianice and 19 km (12 mi) west of the regional capital Łódź.

The gmina covers an area of 133.87 square kilometres (51.7 sq mi) and in 2006 its total population was 7,090.

== Villages ==
Gmina Lutomiersk contains the villages and settlements of:

- Albertów
- Antoniew
- Babice
- Babiczki
- Bechcice Kolonia
- Bechcice-Parcela
- Bechcice-Wieś
- Charbice Dolne
- Charbice Górne
- Czołczyn
- Dziechtarzew
- Florentynów
- Franciszków
- Jerwonice
- Jeziorko
- Kazimierz
- Legendzin
- Lutomiersk
- Madaje Nowe
- Malanów
- Mianów
- Mikołajewice
- Mikołajewice-Kolonia
- Mirosławice
- Orzechów
- Prusinowice
- Prusinowiczki
- Puczniew
- Puczniew-Leonów
- Stanisławów Nowy
- Stanisławów Stary
- Szydłów
- Szydłówek
- Wola Puczniewska
- Wrząca
- Wygoda Mikołajewska
- Zalew
- Zdziechów
- Zdziechów Nowy
- Zdziechów-Kolonia
- Żurawieniec
- Zygmuntów

== Neighbouring gminas ==
Gmina Lutomiersk is bordered by the town of Konstantynów Łódzki and by the gminas of Aleksandrów Łódzki, Dalików, Łask, Pabianice, Poddębice, Wodzierady and Zadzim.
