= Mikołajewice, Pabianice County =

Mikołajewice
- Village
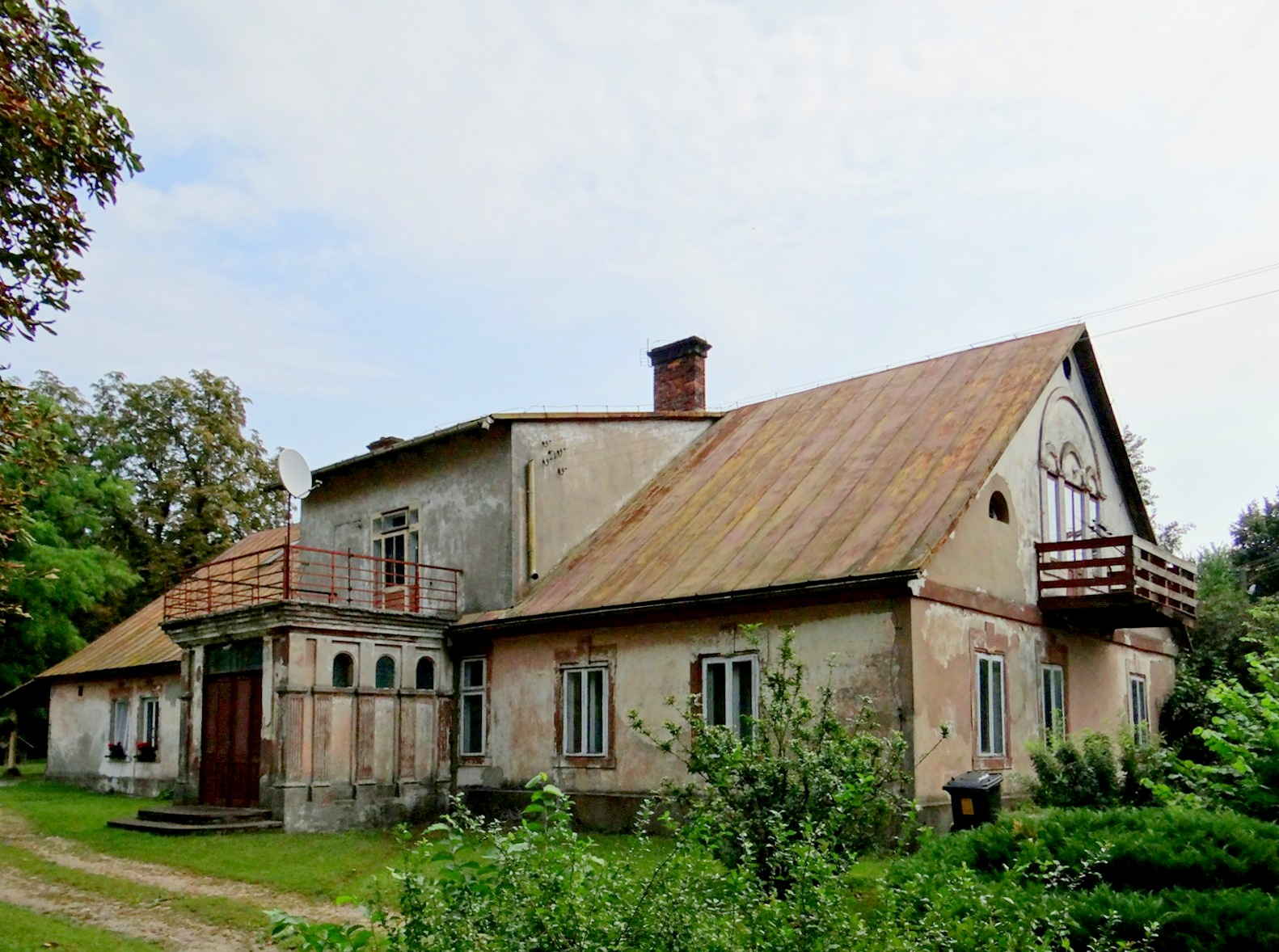
- Manor

- Location within Poland
- Coordinates: 51°44′N 19°11′E
- Country: Poland
- Voivodeship: Łódź
- County: Pabianice
- Gmina: Lutomiersk

Mikołajewice [mikɔwajɛˈvit͡sɛ] is a village in the administrative district of Gmina Lutomiersk, within Pabianice County, Łódź Voivodeship, in central Poland.
