= Prusinowiczki =

- Village
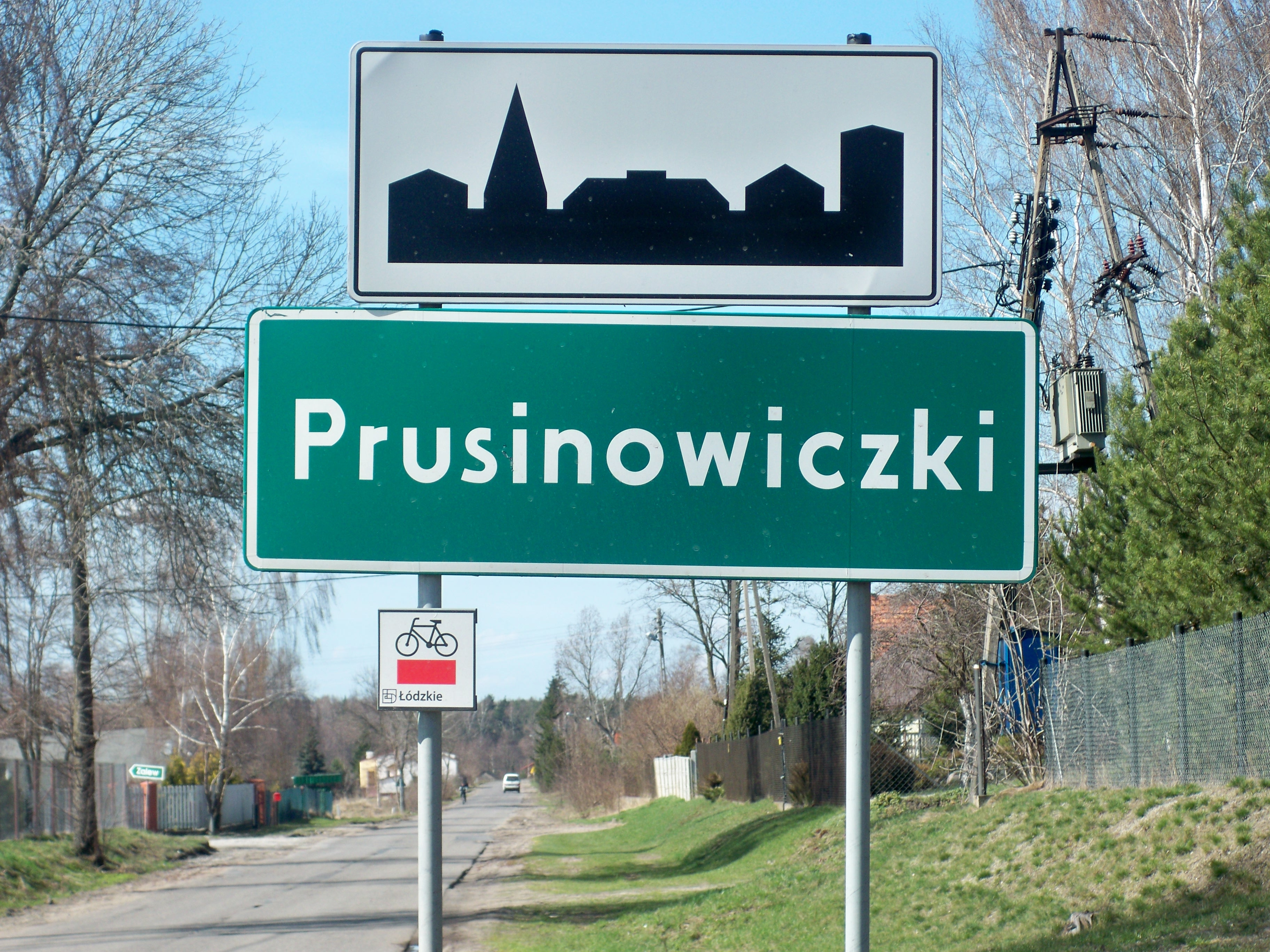

- Location within Poland
- Coordinates: 51°43′38″N 19°14′43″E
- Country: Poland
- Voivodeship: Łódź
- County: Pabianice
- Gmina: Lutomiersk
- Population: 50

Prusinowiczki [pruɕinɔˈvit͡ʂki] is a village in the administrative district of Gmina Lutomiersk, within Pabianice County, Łódź Voivodeship, in central Poland.
