= Zdziechów =

Zdziechów may refer to the following places:

- Zdziechów, Łódź Voivodeship (central Poland)
- Zdziechów, Radom County in Masovian Voivodeship (east-central Poland)
- Zdziechów, Szydłowiec County in Masovian Voivodeship (east-central Poland)
