= Madaje Nowe =

- Village
- Location within Poland
- Coordinates: 51°49′N 19°7′E
- Country: Poland
- Voivodeship: Łódź
- County: Pabianice
- Gmina: Lutomiersk

Madaje Nowe [maˈdajɛ ˈnɔvɛ] is a village in the administrative district of Gmina Lutomiersk, within Pabianice County, Łódź Voivodeship, in central Poland.
