= Czołczyn =

- Village
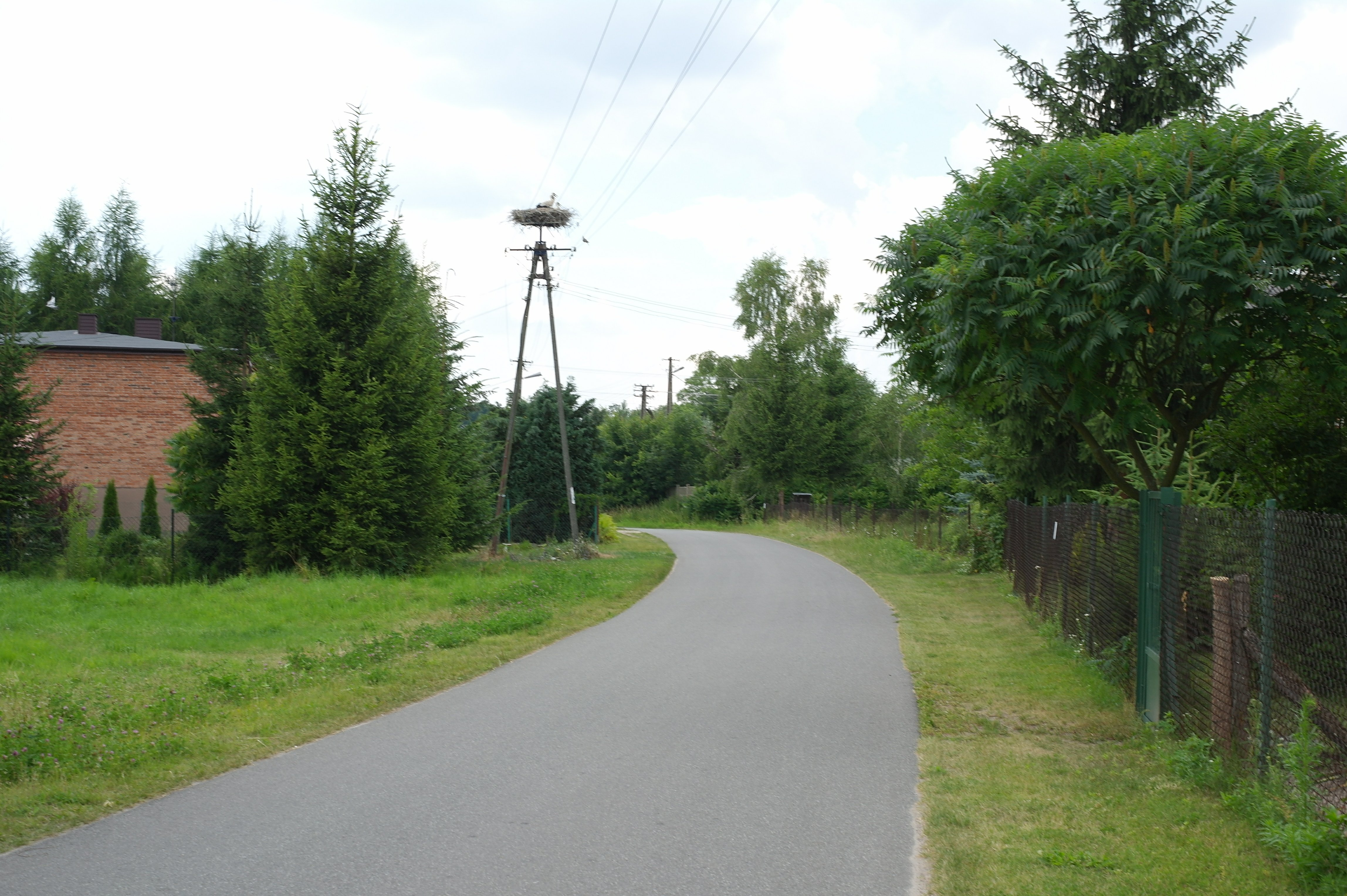

- Location within Poland
- Coordinates: 51°46′N 19°10′E
- Country: Poland
- Voivodeship: Łódź
- County: Pabianice
- Gmina: Lutomiersk
- Population (approx.): 200

Czołczyn [ˈt͡ʂɔu̯t͡ʂɨn] is a village in the administrative district of Gmina Lutomiersk, within Pabianice County, Łódź Voivodeship, in central Poland.

The village has an approximate population of 200.
