= Bechcice-Parcela =

- Village
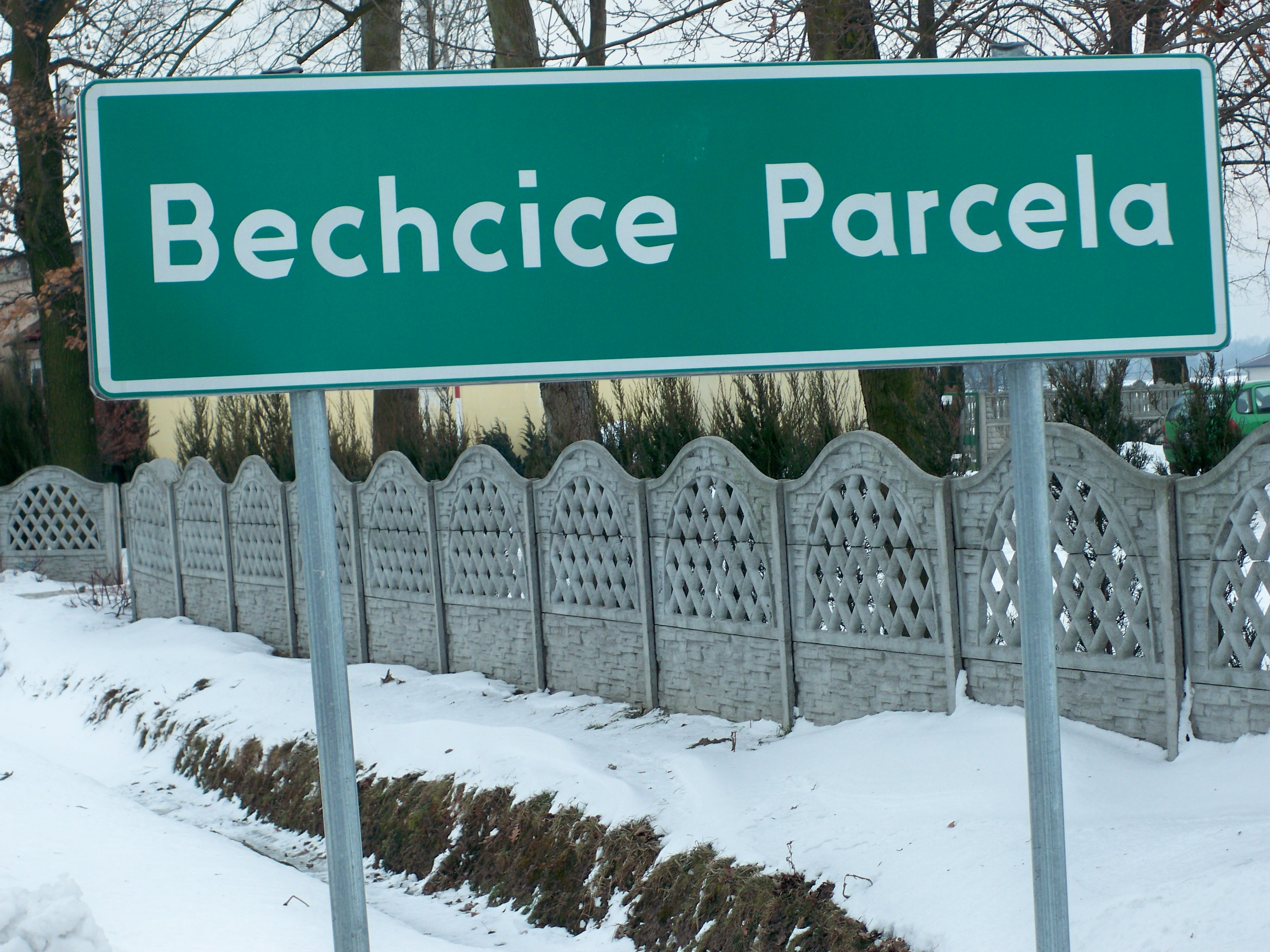

- Location within Poland
- Coordinates: 51°44′55″N 19°15′15″E
- Country: Poland
- Voivodeship: Łódź
- County: Pabianice
- Gmina: Lutomiersk

Bechcice-Parcela [bɛxˈt͡ɕit͡sɛ parˈt͡sɛla] is a village in the administrative district of Gmina Lutomiersk, within Pabianice County, Łódź Voivodeship, in central Poland.
