= Babice, Łódź Voivodeship =

Babice
- Village
- Location within Poland
- Coordinates: 51°46′N 19°15′E
- Country: Poland
- Voivodeship: Łódź
- County: Pabianice
- Gmina: Lutomiersk

Babice (Polish pronunciation: [baˈbit͡sɛ]) is a village in the administrative district of Gmina Lutomiersk, within Pabianice County, Łódź Voivodeship, in central Poland.
