= Nowa Gadka =

- Village
- Location within Poland
- Coordinates: 51°40′52″N 19°25′42″E
- Country: Poland
- Voivodeship: Łódź
- County: Pabianice
- Gmina: Ksawerów

Nowa Gadka (Polish pronunciation: [ˈnɔva ˈɡatka]) is a village in the administrative district of Gmina Ksawerów, within Pabianice County, Łódź Voivodeship, in central Poland.
