= Aleksander Arkuszyński =

Polish Armed Forces brigade general officer

- Born: February 27, 1918
- Died: April 1, 2016 (aged 98)
- Military career
- Allegiance: Second Polish Republic (1939–1949)
- Branch: Armed Forces
- Service years: 1939–1949
- Rank: Brigadier General
- Nickname: Maj.
- Unit: 18th Infantry Regiment
- Conflicts: Invasion of Poland
- Awards: Virtuti Militari Order of Polonia Restituta Cross of Valour (Poland)
- Other work: Author

Aleksander Arkuszyński ps. Maj (27 February 1918, Dąbrowa nad Czarną, Poland – 1 April 2016, Ksawerów, Poland) was a brigade general officer for the Polish Armed Forces and a knight in the Virtuti Militari, who was twice awarded the Cross of Valour for his actions during the Second World War. He was also the author of the book Przeciw dwóm wrogom, describing the history of the Home Army and the Ruch Oporu Armii Krajowej in his area.

== Life ==
Arkuszyński graduated from secondary school in Piotrków Trybunalski. As a squad leader of the 18th Infantry Regiment, he fought during the Invasion of Poland. He was captured by the Nazi army from which he escaped and returned home. From mid-February 1944 onward, he served as commander of the guerrilla detachment "Grom". In July 1944, under Operation Tempest, he was drafted with his division to 25 pp of the Home Army, where he was commander of the platoon. He participated in many clashes with the enemy forces, among others, at Kawęczyn and the Devil Mountain in Goleszach, Polichno, Brzustowie, Dąbrówce trzech Morgach, Klementynowie, Moszczenica, Srocku, Mierzyn, Małych Końskich, Srocku, Rozprza, Ojrzeniu, Petrykozy, Gajowiec Gazomka and Gazomka, Rożenku, Jawor, Stefanów, and Jastrzębiu. In 1949, he was arrested and tried on false charges. After nearly 3 years of investigation, the Regional Court of Łódź acquitted him.

On 24 April 2008, president Lech Kaczyński promoted Arkuszyński to the rank of brigadier general.

In 2013, in recognition of outstanding achievements in nurturing the memory of recent Polish history and the dissemination of knowledge about the activities of the Polish Underground State in connection with the National Day of Remembrance in Poland with "Żołnierzy Wyklętych", he was awarded by President Bronislaw Komorowski the Commander's Cross of the Order of Polonia Restituta.

Arkuszyński was an honorary citizen of Piotrków Trybunalski and Pabianice.

He died on 1 April 2016 in Ksawerów at the age of 98.

== Bibliography ==
- Arkuszyński Aleksander "Przeciw dwóm wrogom", Łódź 1995.
- Kopa Mirosław, Arkuszyński Aleksander, Kępińska-Bazylewicz Halina "Dzieje 25pp Armii Krajowej", Łódź 2001.
