= Wola Zaradzyńska =

- Village
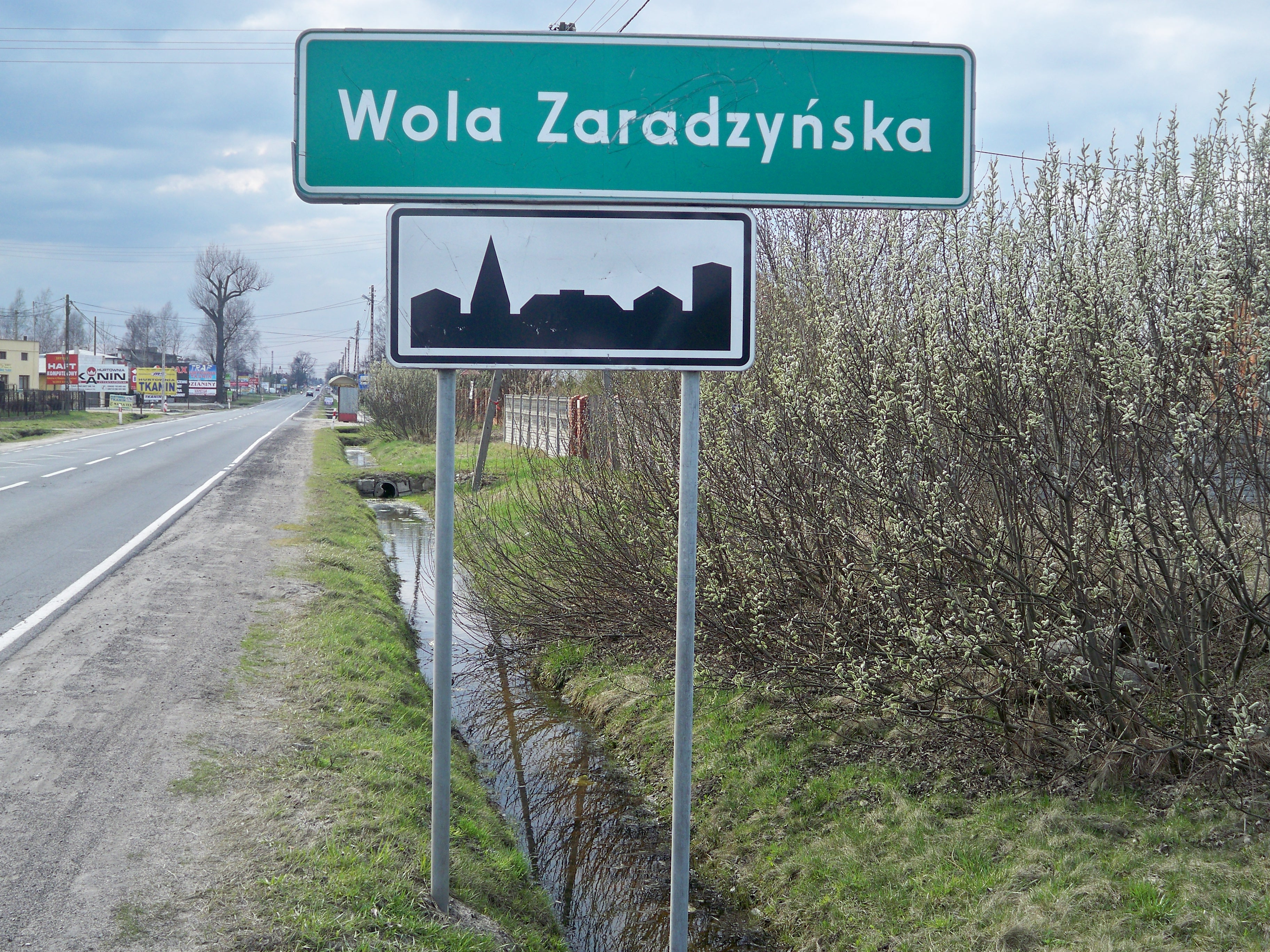

- Location within Poland
- Coordinates: 51°40′N 19°26′E
- Country: Poland
- Voivodeship: Łódź
- County: Pabianice
- Gmina: Ksawerów
- Population: 450

Wola Zaradzyńska [ˈvɔla zaraˈd͡zɨɲska] is a village in the administrative district of Gmina Ksawerów, within Pabianice County, Łódź Voivodeship, in central Poland.
