= Franciszków, Pabianice County =

Village in Łódź Voivodeship, Poland

Franciszków
- Village
- Location within Poland
- Coordinates: 51°49′N 19°5′E
- Country: Poland
- Voivodeship: Łódź
- County: Pabianice
- Gmina: Lutomiersk

Franciszków (Polish pronunciation: [fraɲˈt͡ɕiʂkuf]) is a village in the administrative district of Gmina Lutomiersk, within Pabianice County, Łódź Voivodeship, in central Poland.
