= Stanisławów Stary =

- Village
- Location within Poland
- Coordinates: 51°47′N 19°14′E
- Country: Poland
- Voivodeship: Łódź
- County: Pabianice
- Gmina: Lutomiersk

Stanisławów Stary [staniˈswavuf ˈstarɨ] is a village in the administrative district of Gmina Lutomiersk, within Pabianice County, Łódź Voivodeship, in central Poland.
