= Albertów, Pabianice County =

Albertów
- Village
- Location within Poland
- Coordinates: 51°48′N 19°11′E
- Country: Poland
- Voivodeship: Łódź
- County: Pabianice
- Gmina: Lutomiersk

Albertów [alˈbɛrtuf] is a village in the administrative district of Gmina Lutomiersk, within Pabianice County, Łódź Voivodeship, in central Poland.
