= Mirosławice =

Mirosławice may refer to the following places in Poland:

- Mirosławice, Lower Silesian Voivodeship (south-west Poland)
- Mirosławice, Kuyavian-Pomeranian Voivodeship (north-central Poland)
- Mirosławice, Łódź Voivodeship (central Poland)
- Mirosławice, West Pomeranian Voivodeship (north-west Poland)
