= Charbice Dolne =

- Village
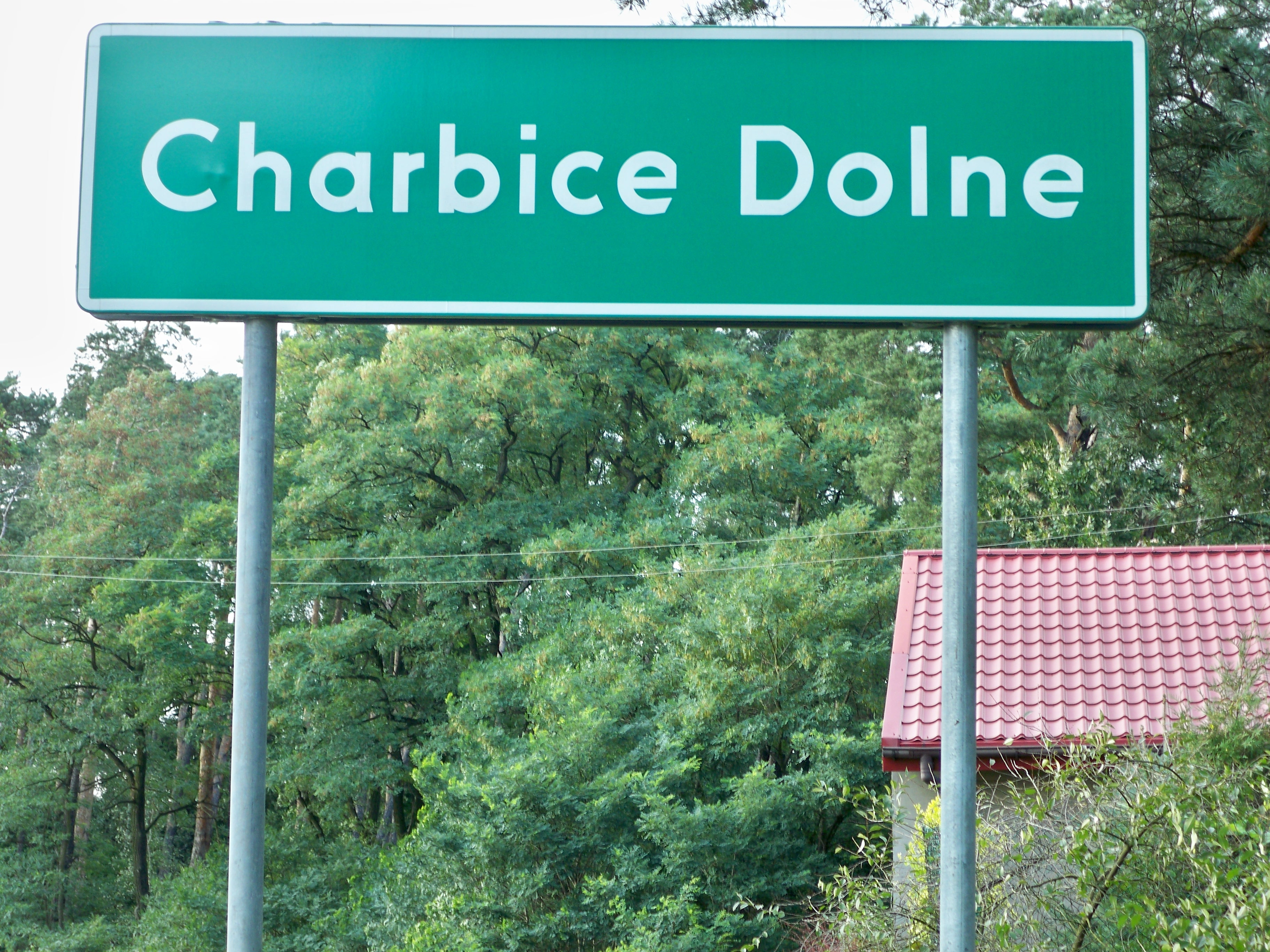

- Location within Poland
- Coordinates: 51°47′N 19°10′E
- Country: Poland
- Voivodeship: Łódź
- County: Pabianice
- Gmina: Lutomiersk

Charbice Dolne [xarˈbit͡sɛ ˈdɔlnɛ] is a village in the administrative district of Gmina Lutomiersk, within Pabianice County, Łódź Voivodeship, in central Poland.
