= Prusinowice, Pabianice County =

Prusinowice
- Village
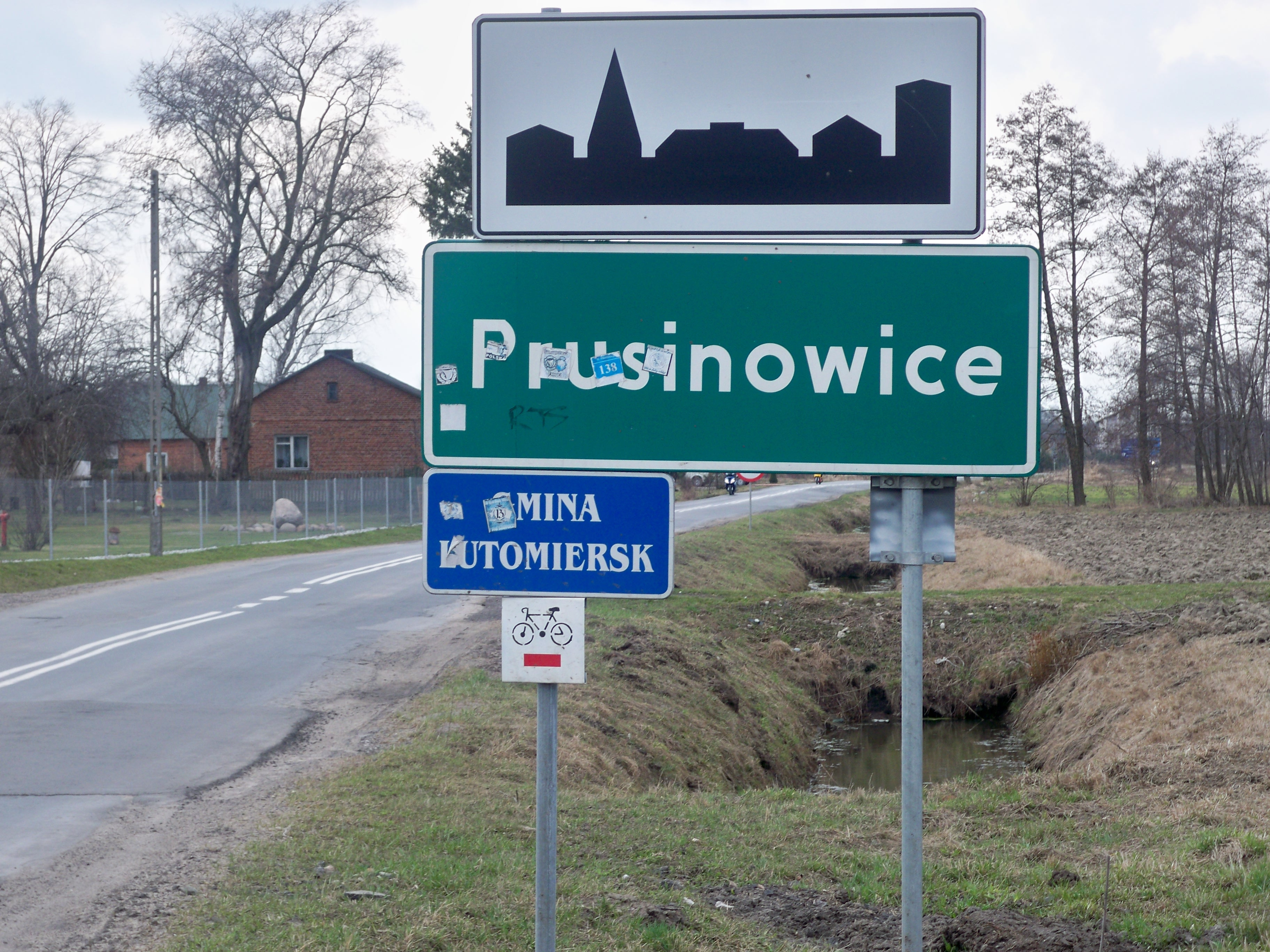

- Location within Poland
- Coordinates: 51°44′N 19°15′E
- Country: Poland
- Voivodeship: Łódź
- County: Pabianice
- Gmina: Lutomiersk

Prusinowice [pruɕinɔˈvit͡sɛ] is a village in the administrative district of Gmina Lutomiersk, within Pabianice County, Łódź Voivodeship, in central Poland.
