= Puczniew-Leonów =

- Village
- Location within Poland
- Coordinates: 51°47′39″N 19°4′26″E
- Country: Poland
- Voivodeship: Łódź
- County: Pabianice
- Gmina: Lutomiersk
- Population: 50

Puczniew-Leonów [ˈput͡ʂɲɛf lɛˈɔnuf] is a village in the administrative district of Gmina Lutomiersk, within Pabianice County, Łódź Voivodeship, in central Poland.
