= Zdziechów, Łódź Voivodeship =

Zdziechów
- Village
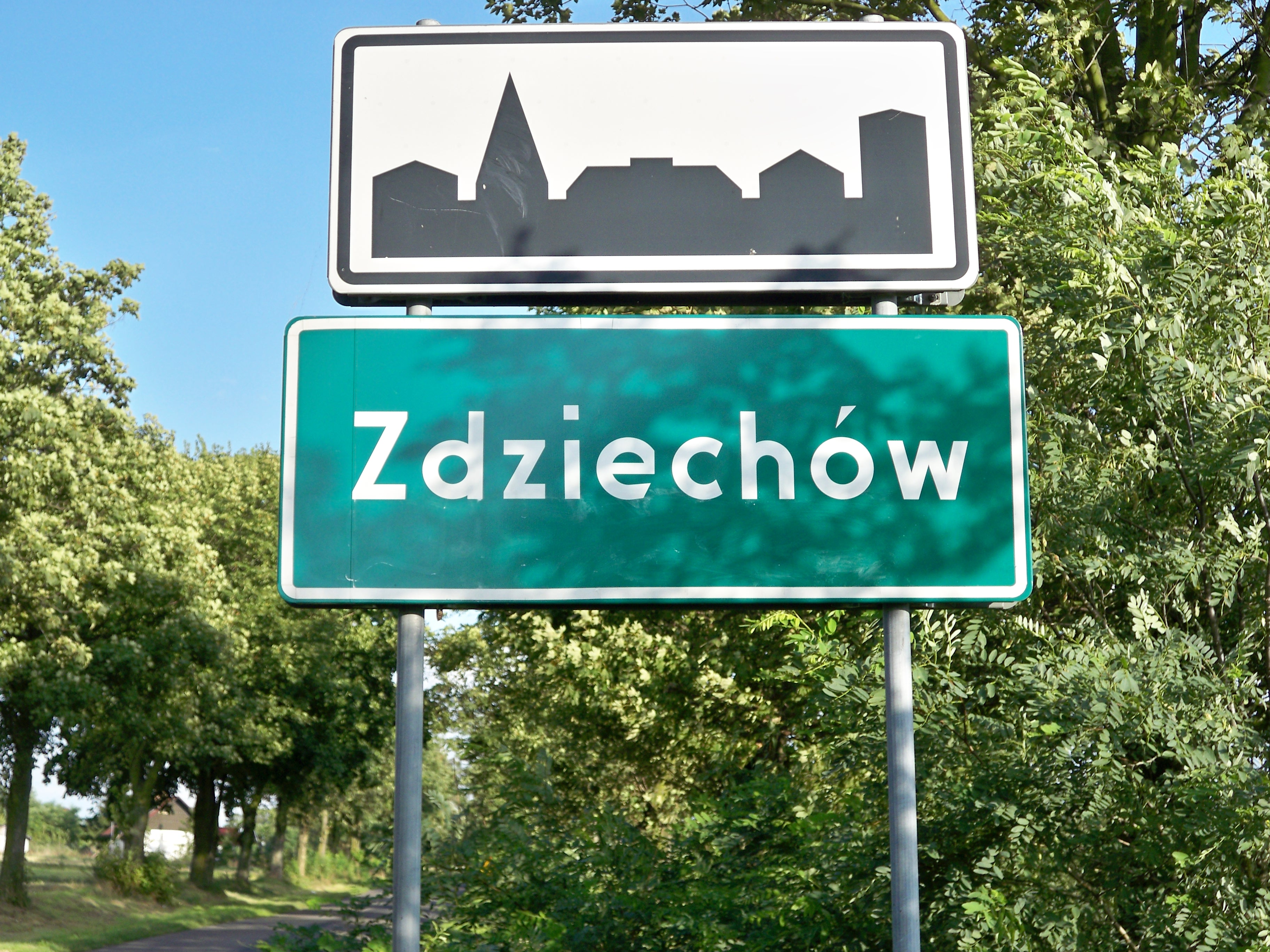

- Location within Poland
- Coordinates: 51°46′28″N 19°11′30″E
- Country: Poland
- Voivodeship: Łódź
- County: Pabianice
- Gmina: Lutomiersk
- Population: 200

Zdziechów [ˈzd͡ʑɛxuf] is a village in the administrative district of Gmina Lutomiersk, within Pabianice County, Łódź Voivodeship, in central Poland.
