= Malanów, Pabianice County =

Malanów
- Village
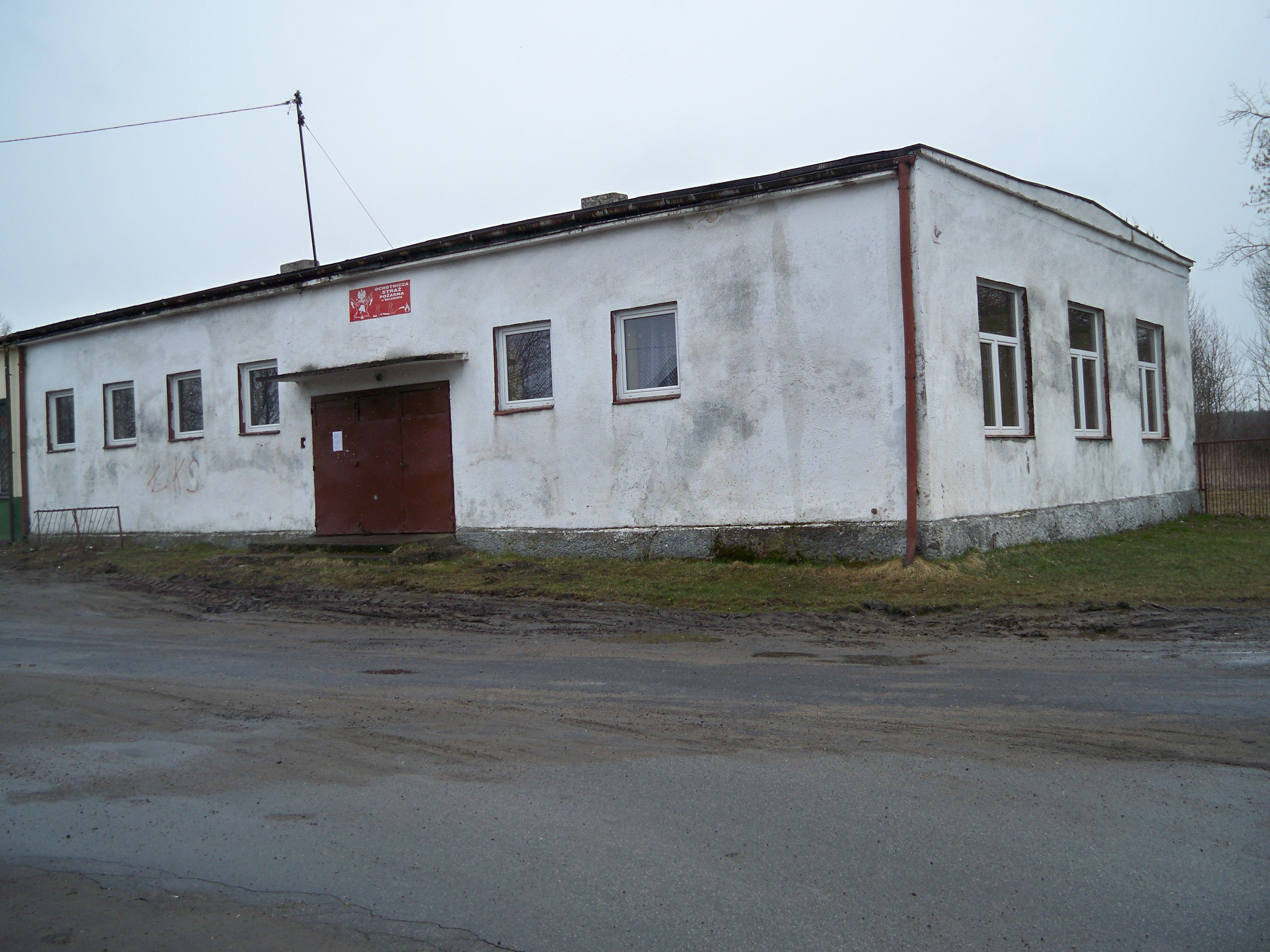
- Fire station

- Location within Poland
- Coordinates: 51°48′N 19°8′E
- Country: Poland
- Voivodeship: Łódź
- County: Pabianice
- Gmina: Lutomiersk
- Population: 160

Malanów [maˈlanuf] is a village in the administrative district of Gmina Lutomiersk, within Pabianice County, Łódź Voivodeship, in central Poland.
