= Dąbrowa nad Czarną =

- Village
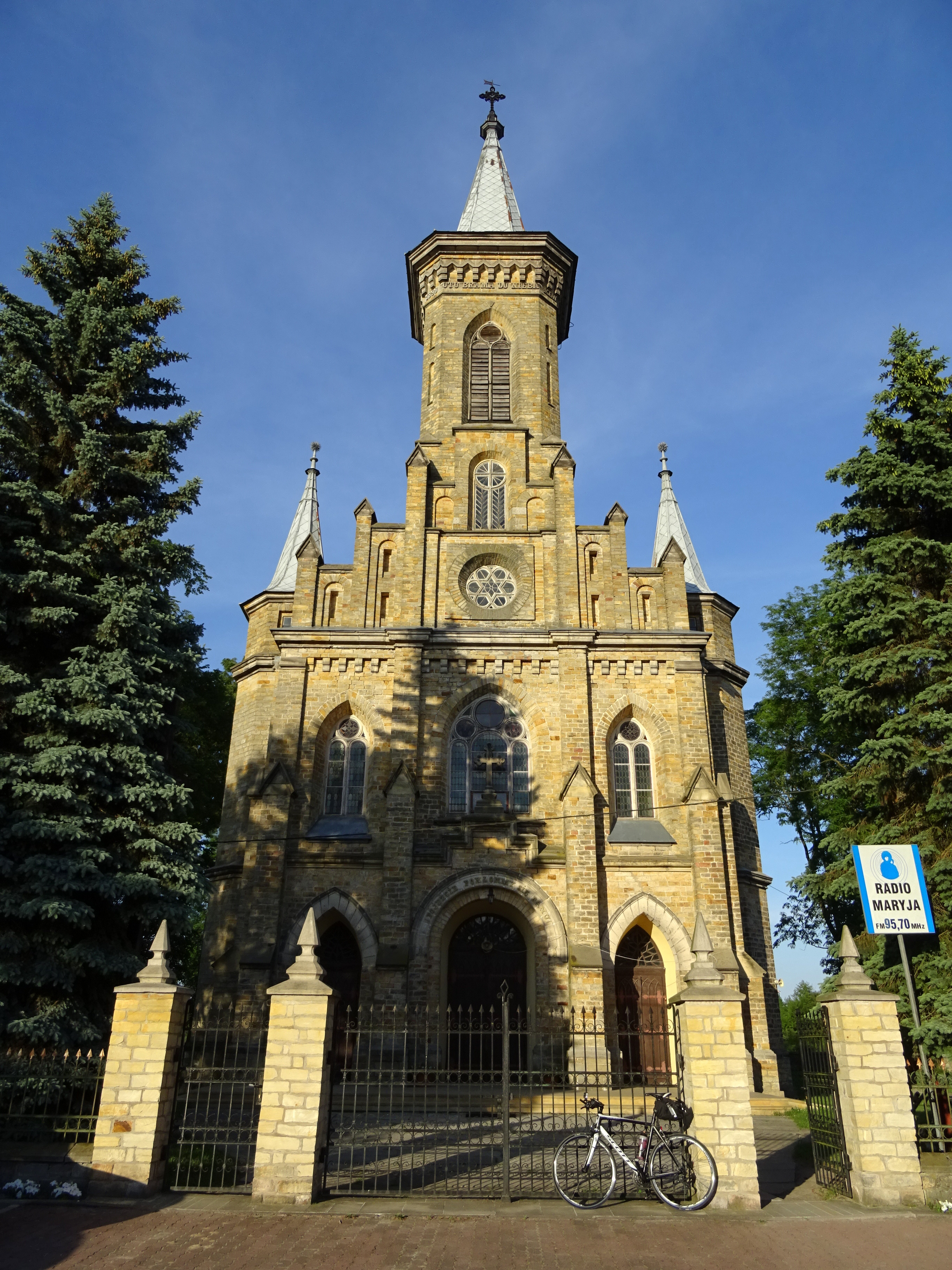
- Catholic church

- Location within Poland
- Coordinates: 51°19′1″N 19°58′19″E
- Country: Poland
- Voivodeship: Łódź
- County: Piotrków
- Gmina: Aleksandrów
- Population: 160

Dąbrowa nad Czarną [dɔmˈbrɔva ˌnat ˈt͡ʂarnɔ̃] is a village in the administrative district of Gmina Aleksandrów, within Piotrków County, Łódź Voivodeship, in central Poland.

== Notable people ==
- Aleksander Arkuszyński (1918–2016), Polish brigadier general
