= Szydłówek, Łódź Voivodeship =

Szydłówek
- Village
- Location within Poland
- Coordinates: 51°47′54″N 19°6′0″E
- Country: Poland
- Voivodeship: Łódź
- County: Pabianice
- Gmina: Lutomiersk

Szydłówek [ʂɨdˈwuvɛk] is a village in the administrative district of Gmina Lutomiersk, within Pabianice County, Łódź Voivodeship, in central Poland.
