= Malanów =

Malanów may refer to the following places:

- Malanów, Greater Poland Voivodeship (west-central Poland)
- Malanów, Pabianice County in Łódź Voivodeship (central Poland)
- Malanów, Wieruszów County in Łódź Voivodeship (central Poland)
