= Mirosławice, Łódź Voivodeship =

Mirosławice
- Village
- Location within Poland
- Coordinates: 51°45′33″N 19°14′47″E
- Country: Poland
- Voivodeship: Łódź
- County: Pabianice
- Gmina: Lutomiersk
- Population: 270

Mirosławice [mirɔswaˈvit͡sɛ] is a village in the administrative district of Gmina Lutomiersk, within Pabianice County, Łódź Voivodeship, in central Poland.
