= Gmina Ksawerów =

Gmina Ksawerów Ksawerów Commune
- Gmina
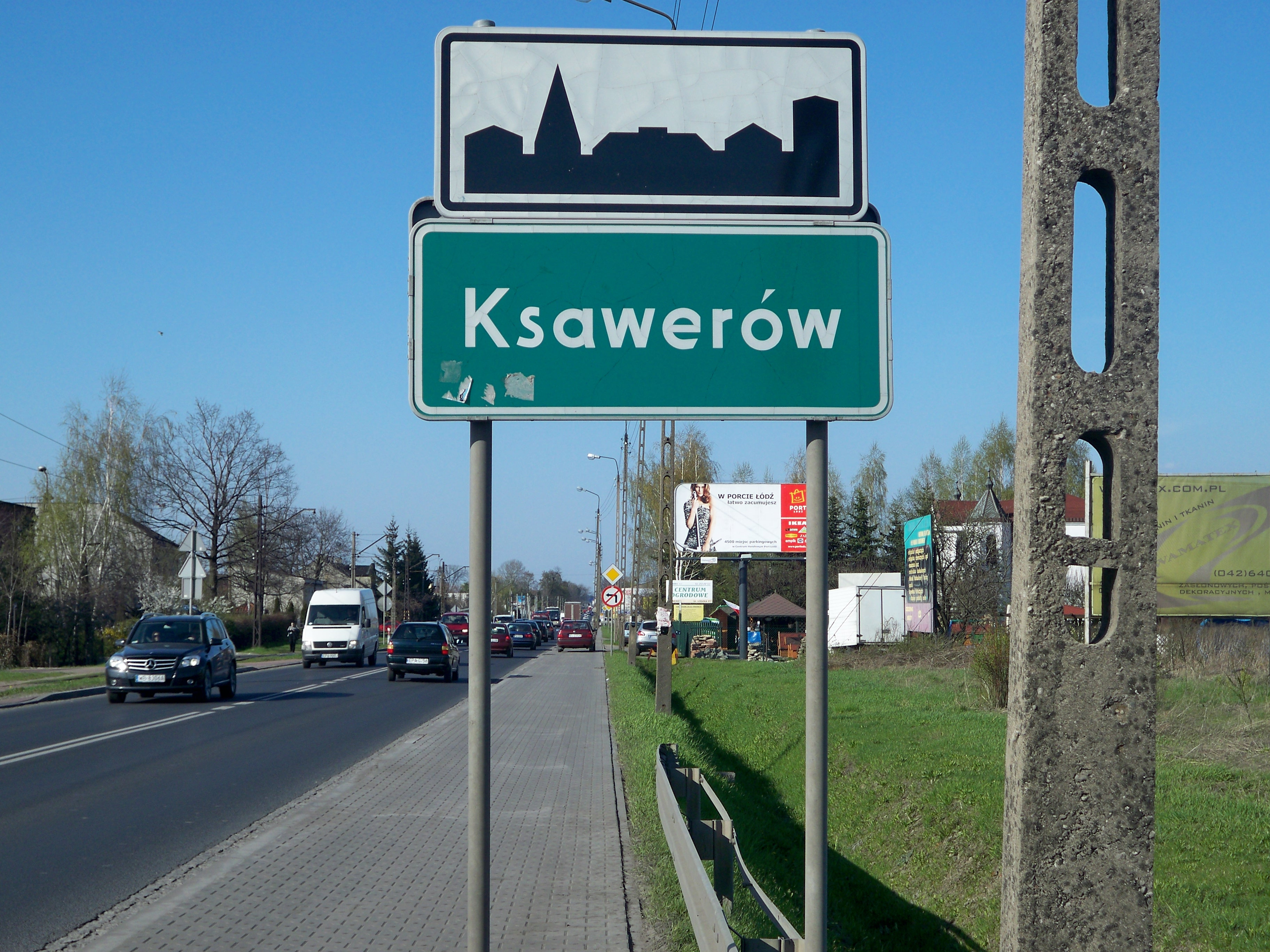

- Flag Coat of arms
- Interactive map of Gmina Ksawerów
- Coordinates (Ksawerów): 51°40′56″N 19°24′10″E
- Country: Poland
- Voivodeship: Łódź
- County: Pabianice
- Seat: Ksawerów

Area
  - Total: 13.64 km^{2} (5.27 sq mi)

Population (2006)
  - Total: 7,155
  - Density: 524.6/km^{2} (1,359/sq mi)
- Time zone: UTC+1 (CET)
  - Summer (DST): UTC+2 (CEST)
- Website: www.ksawerow.com

Gmina Ksawerów is a rural gmina (administrative district) in Pabianice County, Łódź Voivodeship, in central Poland. Its seat is the village of Ksawerów, which lies approximately 4 kilometres (2 mi) north of Pabianice and 13 km (8 mi) south of the regional capital Łódź.

The gmina covers an area of 13.64 square kilometres (5.3 sq mi), and as of 2006 its total population is 7,155.

== Villages ==
Gmina Ksawerów contains the villages and settlements of:

- Kolonia Wola Zaradzyńska
- Ksawerów
- Nowa Gadka
- Wola Zaradzyńska

== Neighbouring gminas ==
Gmina Ksawerów is bordered by the towns of Łódź and Pabianice, and by the gmina of Rzgów.
