= Konstantynów Łódzki =

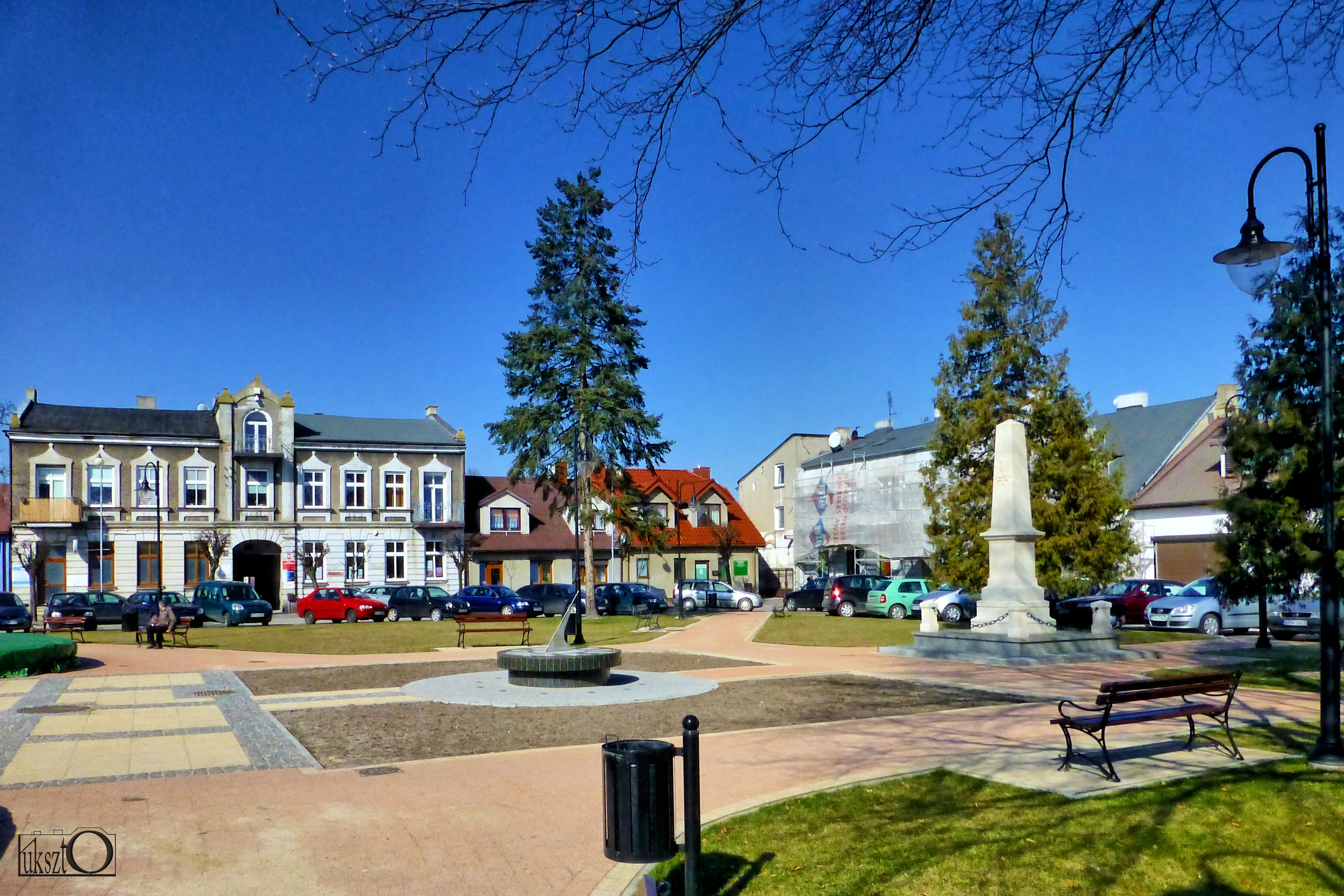
- Town center

- Flag Coat of arms

- Location within Poland
- Coordinates: 51°45′N 19°20′E
- Country: Poland
- Voivodeship: Łódź
- County: Pabianice
- Gmina: Konstantynów Łódzki (urban gmina)

Government
  - Mayor: Robert Jakubowski

Area
  - Total: 26.87 km^{2} (10.37 sq mi)

Population (31 December 2020)
  - Total: 18,335 ▲
  - Density: 682.4/km^{2} (1,767/sq mi)
- Time zone: UTC+1 (CET)
  - Summer (DST): UTC+2 (CEST)
- Postal code: 95-050
- Car plates: EPA
- Website: https://www.konstantynow.pl/

Konstantynów Łódzki [kɔnstanˈtɨnuf ˈwut͡skʲi] is a town in Pabianice County, Łódź Voivodeship, in central Poland, with 18,335 inhabitants (2020). It borders Łódź to the east, Lutomiersk to the west, Aleksandrów Łódzki to the north, and Porszewice to the south.

== History ==
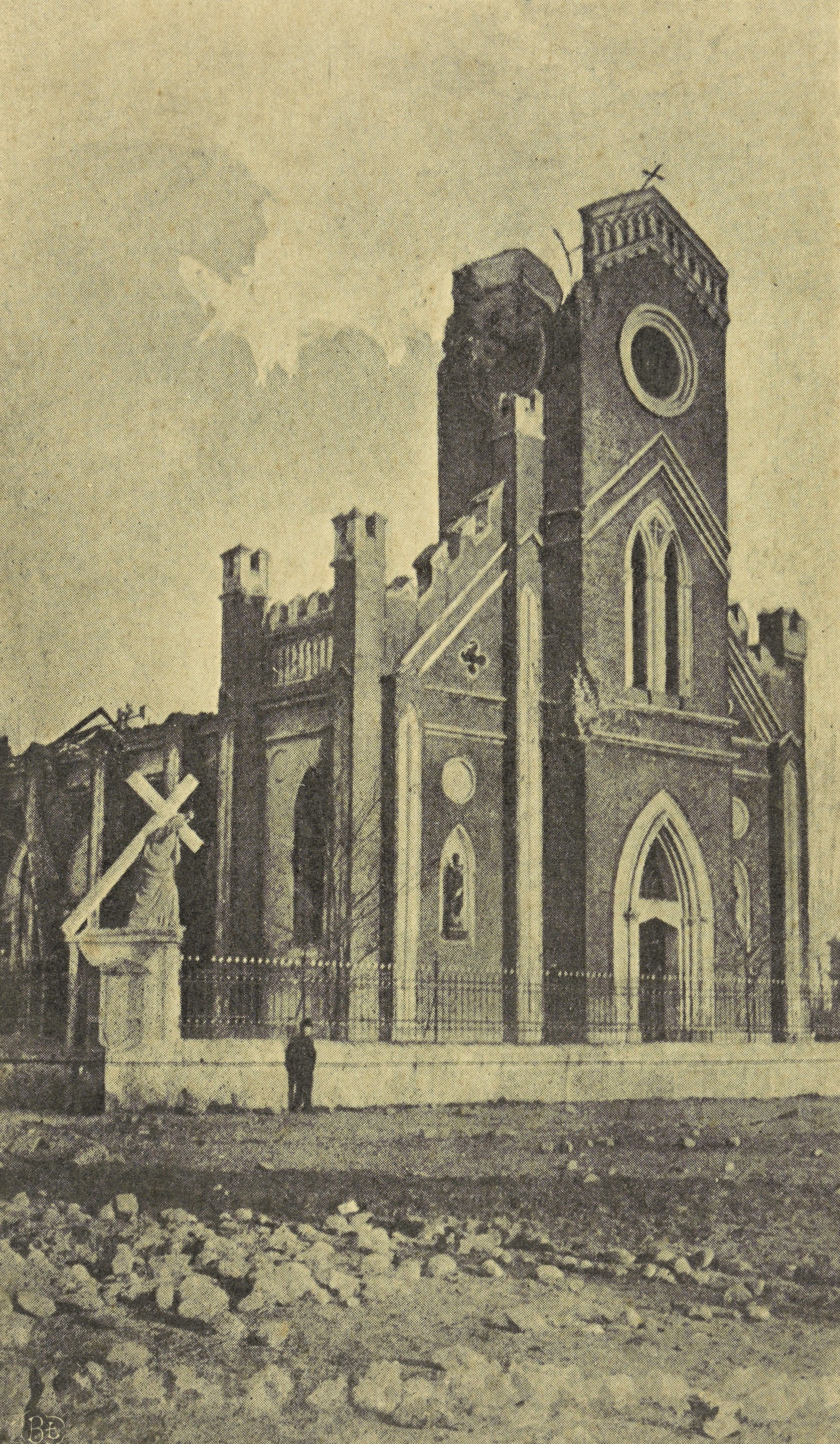
Devastated church during World War I

It was founded in the 1820s by a landowner who had planned to build a textile industry there. In 1821 Konstantynów Łódzki, at that time still a village, became a part of the textile industry of the Łódź region. Shortly thereafter, in 1824 the town was given its current name and was established as a town in 1830. Town rights were revoked in 1870 and restored in 1924.

Following the German-Soviet invasion of Poland, which started World War II in September 1939, it was occupied by Germany until 1945.

== Notable residents ==
- Krzysztof Matyjaszewski (born 1950), Polish-American chemist, Wolf Prize winner
