= Lutomiersk =

- Town
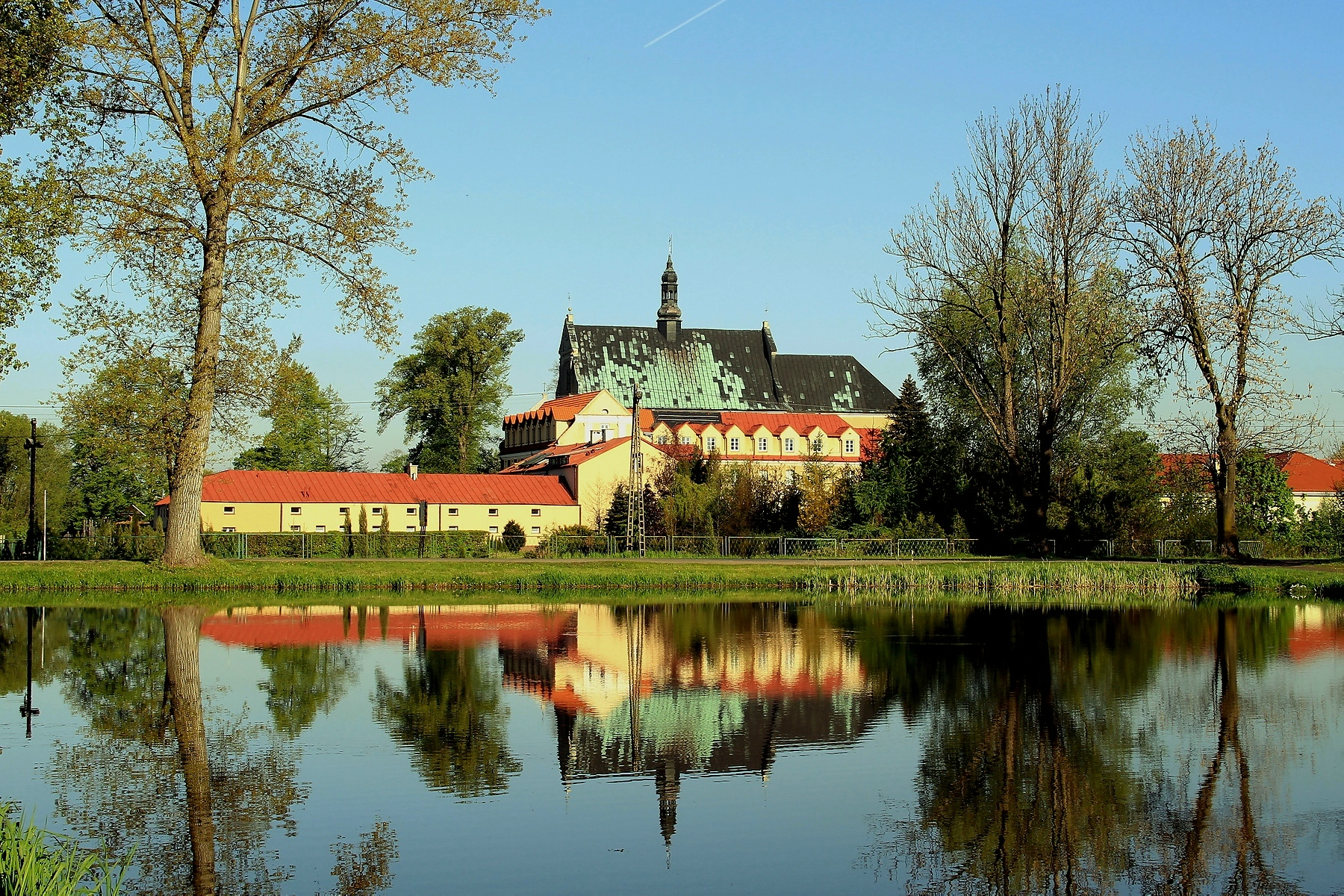
- Monastery in Lutomiersk

- Flag Coat of arms

- Location within Poland
- Coordinates: 51°45′N 19°12′E
- Country: Poland
- Voivodeship: Łódź
- County: Pabianice
- Gmina: Lutomiersk
- Town rights: 1274

Population (approx.)
  - Total: 1,500
- Time zone: UTC+1 (CET)
  - Summer (DST): UTC+2 (CEST)
- Vehicle registration: EPA
- Primary airport: Łódź Władysław Reymont Airport

Lutomiersk [luˈtɔmjɛrsk] is a town in Pabianice County, Łódź Voivodeship, in central Poland. It is the seat of the gmina (administrative district) called Gmina Lutomiersk. It lies approximately 17 km (11 mi) north-west of Pabianice and 19 km (12 mi) west of the regional capital Łódź. It is located in the Sieradz Land.

The town has an approximate population of 2,000.

== History ==
Lutomiersk was granted town rights in 1274 by Duke Leszek II the Black from the Piast dynasty. It was a private town, administratively located in the Szadek County in the Sieradz Voivodeship in the Greater Poland Province of the Kingdom of Poland.

During the German occupation of Poland (World War II), in 1940, the occupiers carried out expulsions of Poles, who were placed in a transit camp in Łódź, and then deported to the General Government in the more eastern part of German-occupied Poland, while their houses and farms were handed over to German colonists as part of the Lebensraum policy. A local Polish teacher was among the victims of a massacre of Poles from the region perpetrated by the Germans in 1939 in nearby Łagiewniki (present-day district of Łódź). Several Poles, who were either born or lived and worked in Lutomiersk, were murdered by the Russians in the Katyn massacre in 1940.

== Transport ==
Lutomiersk has a bus connection to Łódź via Konstantynów Łódzki. This is line 94 going approximately every hour and supported by "MPK Lodz". There is also a line ŁA4 connecting Lutomiersk with the train station in Pabianice. There are also 2 bus lines: Łódź (Independence Square) - Konstantynów Łódzki - Lutomiersk and Pabianice - Lutomiersk.
