= Ksawerów, Pabianice County =

Ksawerów
- Village
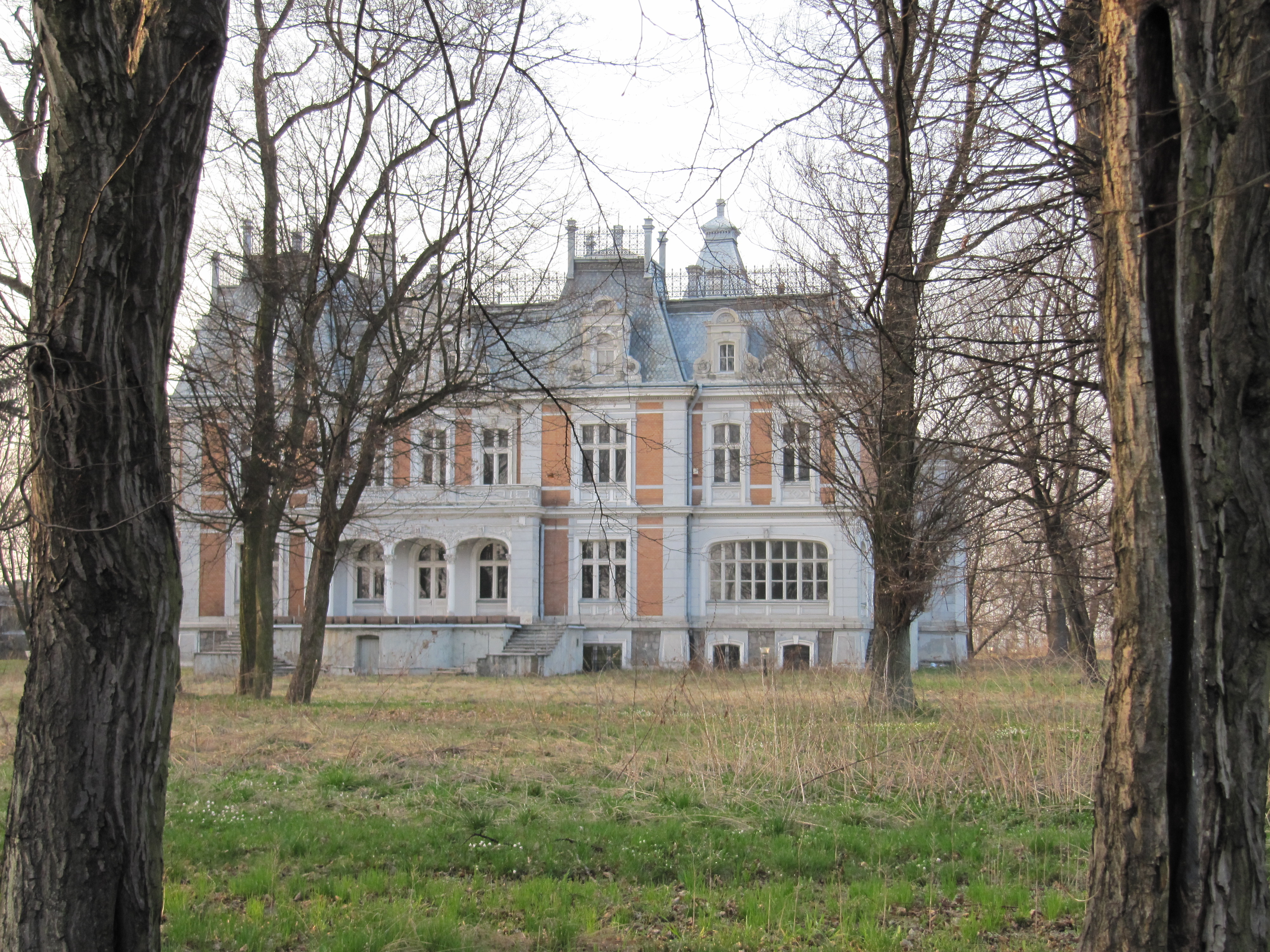
- Palace in Widzew, Ksawerów

- Location within Poland
- Coordinates: 51°40′56″N 19°24′10″E
- Country: Poland
- Voivodeship: Łódź
- County: Pabianice
- Gmina: Ksawerów

Population
  - Total: 3,000

Ksawerów [ksaˈvɛruf] is a village in Pabianice County, Łódź Voivodeship, in central Poland. It is the seat of the gmina (administrative district) called Gmina Ksawerów.
