= Pabianice County =

Pabianice County Powiat pabianicki
- County
- Flag Coat of arms

- Location within the voivodeship
- Coordinates (Pabianice): 51°39′N 19°23′E
- Country: Poland
- Voivodeship: Łódź
- Seat: Pabianice
- Gminas: Total 7 (incl. 2 urban): Konstantynów Łódzki; Pabianice; Gmina Dłutów; Gmina Dobroń; Gmina Ksawerów; Gmina Lutomiersk; Gmina Pabianice

Area
  - Total: 490.77 km^{2} (189.49 sq mi)

Population (2006)
  - Total: 119,008
  - Density: 242.49/km^{2} (628.05/sq mi)
  - Urban: 88,009
  - Rural: 30,999
- Car plates: EPA
- Website: www.powiat.pabianice.pl

Pabianice County (Polish: powiat pabianicki) is a unit of territorial administration and local government (powiat) in Łódź Voivodeship, central Poland. It came into being on January 1, 1999, as a result of the Polish local government reforms passed in 1998. Its administrative seat and largest town is Pabianice, which lies 16 kilometres (10 mi) south of the regional capital Łódź. The only other town in the county is Konstantynów Łódzki, lying 12 km (7 mi) north of Pabianice.

The county covers an area of 490.77 square kilometres (189.5 sq mi). As of 2006, its total population was 119,008, out of which the population of Pabianice was 70,445, that of Konstantynów Łódzki 17,564, and the rural population was 30,999.

== Neighbouring counties ==
Pabianice County is bordered by Zgierz County to the north, the city of Łódź and Łódź East County to the east, Piotrków County to the south-east, Bełchatów County to the south, Łask County to the west, and Poddębice County to the north-west.

== Administrative divisions ==
The county is subdivided into seven gminas (two urban and five rural). These are listed in the following table, in descending order of population.

Gmina	Type	Area (km^{2})	Population (2006)	Seat
Pabianice	urban	33.0	70,445	
Konstantynów Łódzki	urban	26.9	17,564	
Gmina Ksawerów	rural	13.6	7,155	Ksawerów
Gmina Lutomiersk	rural	133.9	7,090	Lutomiersk
Gmina Dobroń	rural	94.4	6,886	Dobroń
Gmina Pabianice	rural	88.6	5,701	Pabianice *
Gmina Dłutów	rural	100.5	4,167	Dłutów
* seat not part of the gmina
