= Majówka =

Majówka is an annual holiday in Poland celebrated during the first three days of May.

Majówka may also refer to the following places in Poland:

- Majówka, Lower Silesian Voivodeship (south-west Poland)
- Majówka, Podlaskie Voivodeship (north-east Poland)
- Majówka, Łódź Voivodeship (central Poland)
