= Konin (disambiguation) =

Konin is a city in central Poland.

Konin may also refer to:

== Poland ==
- Konin, Łódź Voivodeship, a village in central Poland
- Konin, Lubusz Voivodeship, a village in west Poland
- Konin, Nowy Tomyśl County, a village in Greater Poland Voivodeship (west-central Poland)
- Konin, Silesian Voivodeship, a village in south Poland

== Japan ==
- Emperor Kōnin (光仁天皇, Kōnin-tennō), emperor of Japan who reigned 770–781
  - Kōnin (era) (弘仁), a Japanese era name for the years 810–824
