= Hermanów =

Hermanów may refer to the following places:

- Hermanów, Łódź Voivodeship (central Poland)
- Hermanów, Lublin Voivodeship (east Poland)
- Hermanów, Świętokrzyskie Voivodeship (south-central Poland)
- Hermanów, Greater Poland Voivodeship (west-central Poland)
