= Janowska =

Janowska is a feminine version of the Polish surname Janowski. Janowska may also refer to the following places in Poland:

- Janowska concentration camp, a Nazi Germany labor and extermination camp in occupied Poland
- Huta Janowska, a village in Gmina Pabianice, Pabianice County, Łódź Voivodeship
- Kolonia Janowska, a settlement in Gmina Pyzdry, Września County, Greater Poland Voivodeship
