= Petrykozy =

Petrykozy may refer to the following places:

- Petrykozy, Opoczno County in Łódź Voivodeship (central Poland)
- Petrykozy, Pabianice County in Łódź Voivodeship (central Poland)
- Petrykozy, Gmina Żabia Wola, Grodzisk County in Masovian Voivodeship (east-central Poland)
- Petrykozy, Sierpc County in Masovian Voivodeship (east-central Poland)
- Petrykozy, Warmian-Masurian Voivodeship (north Poland)
- Petrykozy, West Pomeranian Voivodeship (north-west Poland)
