= Kudrowice =

- Village
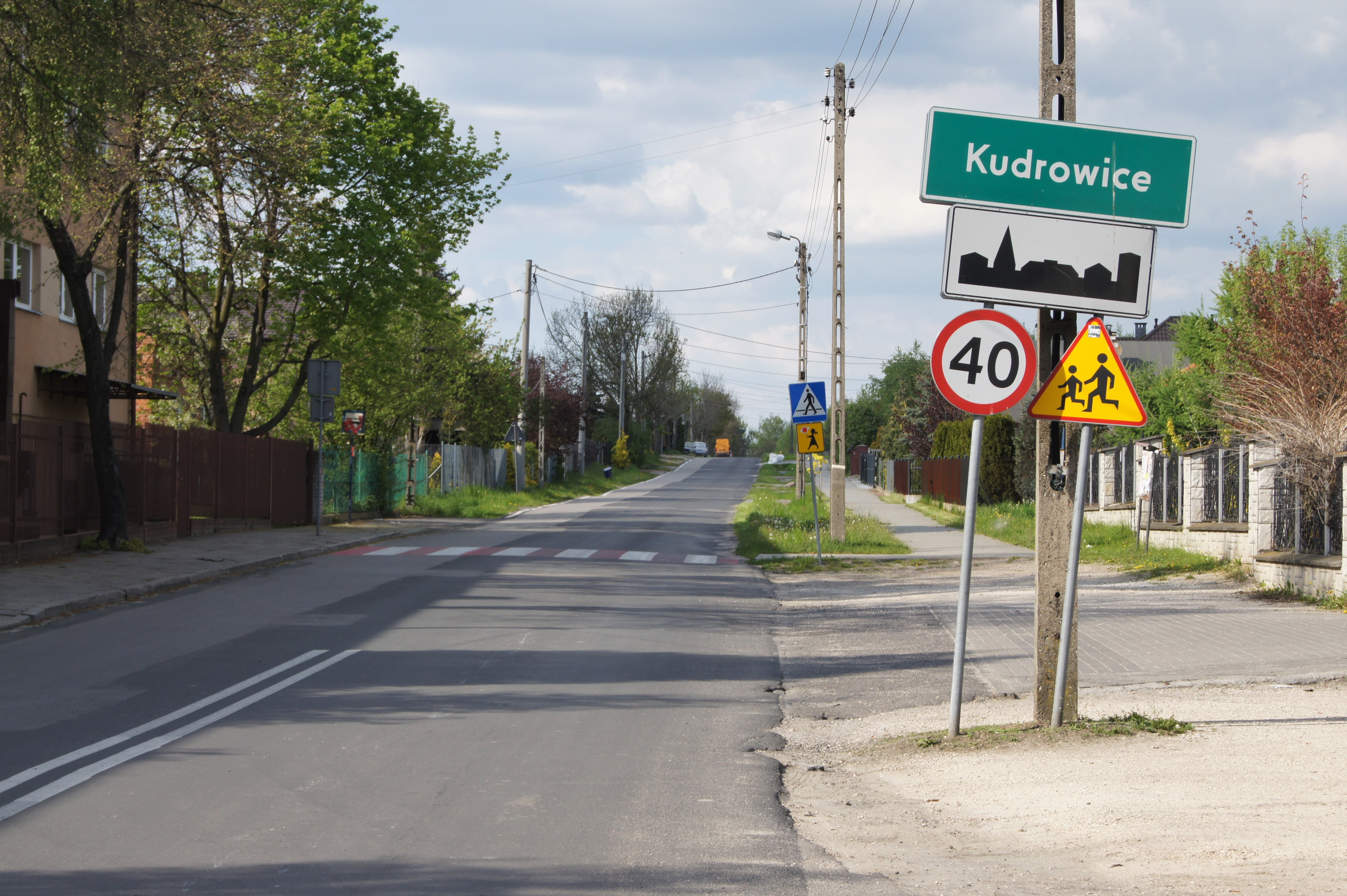

- Location within Poland
- Coordinates: 51°41′N 19°17′E
- Country: Poland
- Voivodeship: Łódź
- County: Pabianice
- Gmina: Pabianice
- Population: 265

Kudrowice [kudrɔˈvit͡sɛ] is a village in the administrative district of Gmina Pabianice, within Pabianice County, Łódź Voivodeship, in central Poland.
