= Piątkowisko =

- Village
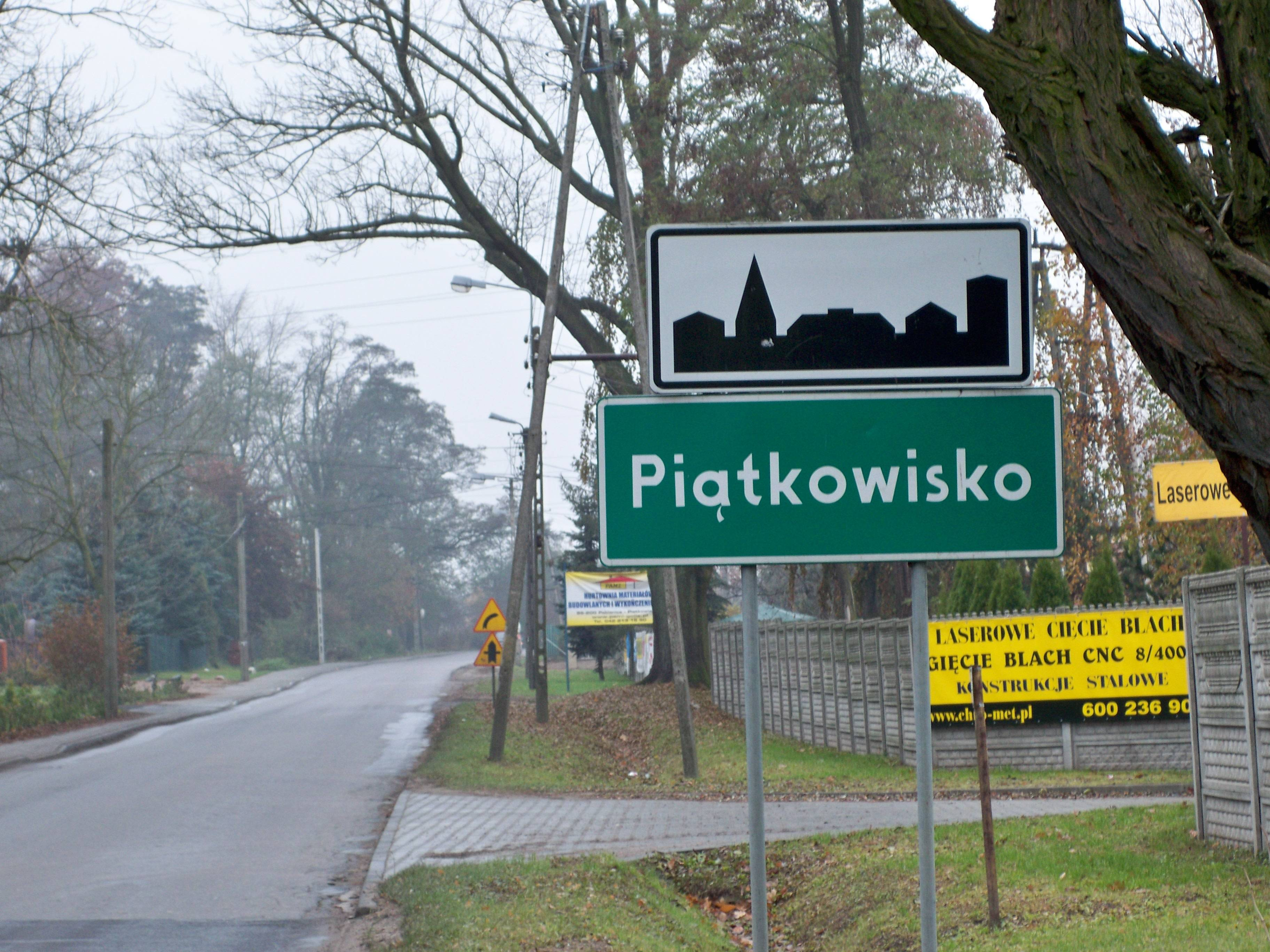
- Entrance sign

- Location within Poland
- Coordinates: 51°41′N 19°18′E
- Country: Poland
- Voivodeship: Łódź
- County: Pabianice
- Gmina: Pabianice
- Population: 700

Piątkowisko [pjɔntkɔˈviskɔ] is a village in the administrative district of Gmina Pabianice, within Pabianice County, Łódź Voivodeship, in central Poland.
