= Porszewice =

- Village
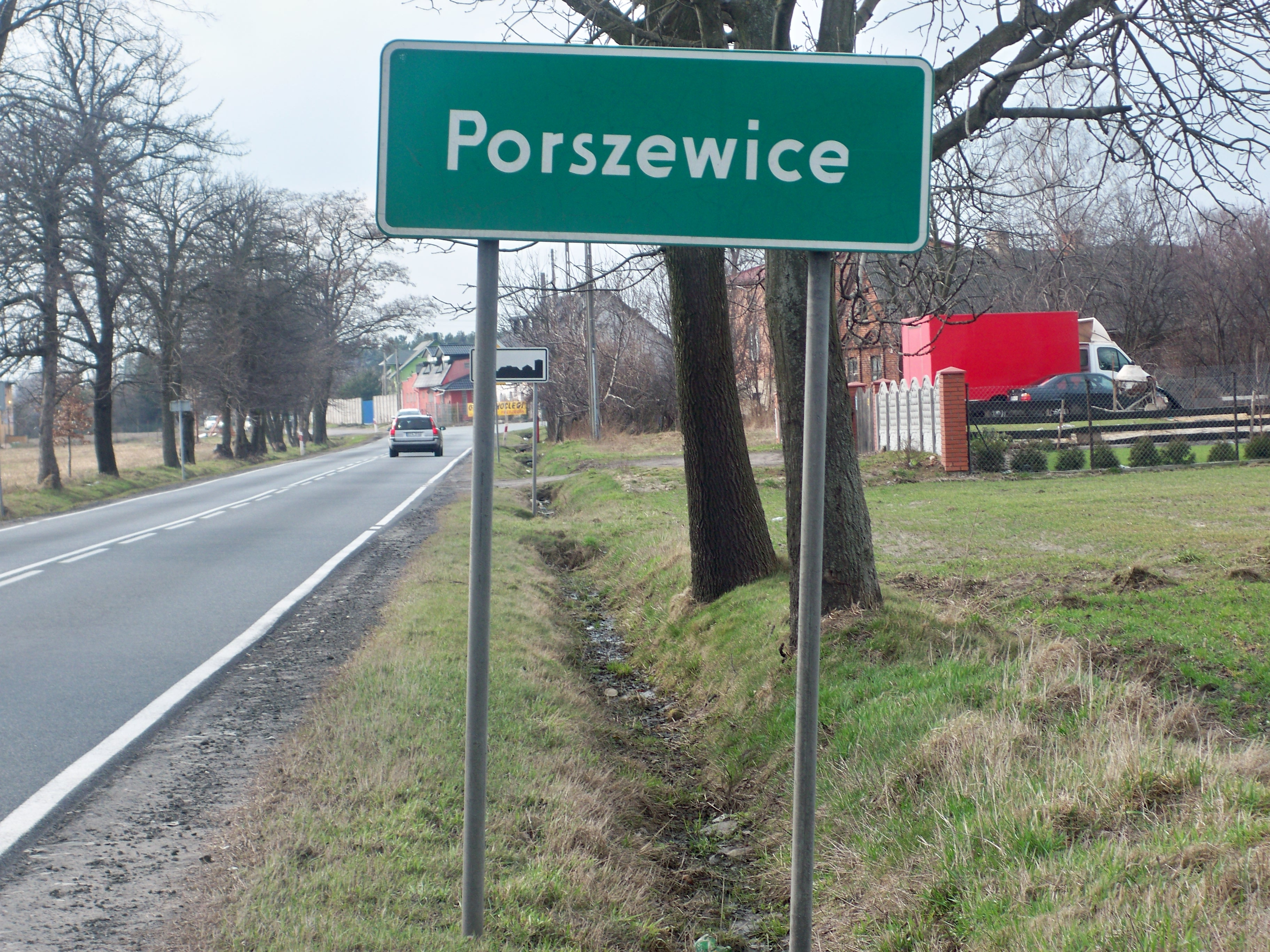
- Entrance sign

- Location within Poland
- Coordinates: 51°43′N 19°18′E
- Country: Poland
- Voivodeship: Łódź
- County: Pabianice
- Gmina: Pabianice
- Population: 300

Porszewice [pɔrʂɛˈvit͡sɛ] is a village in the administrative district of Gmina Pabianice, within Pabianice County, Łódź Voivodeship, in central Poland.
