= Pawlikowice, Pabianice County =

Pawlikowice
- Village
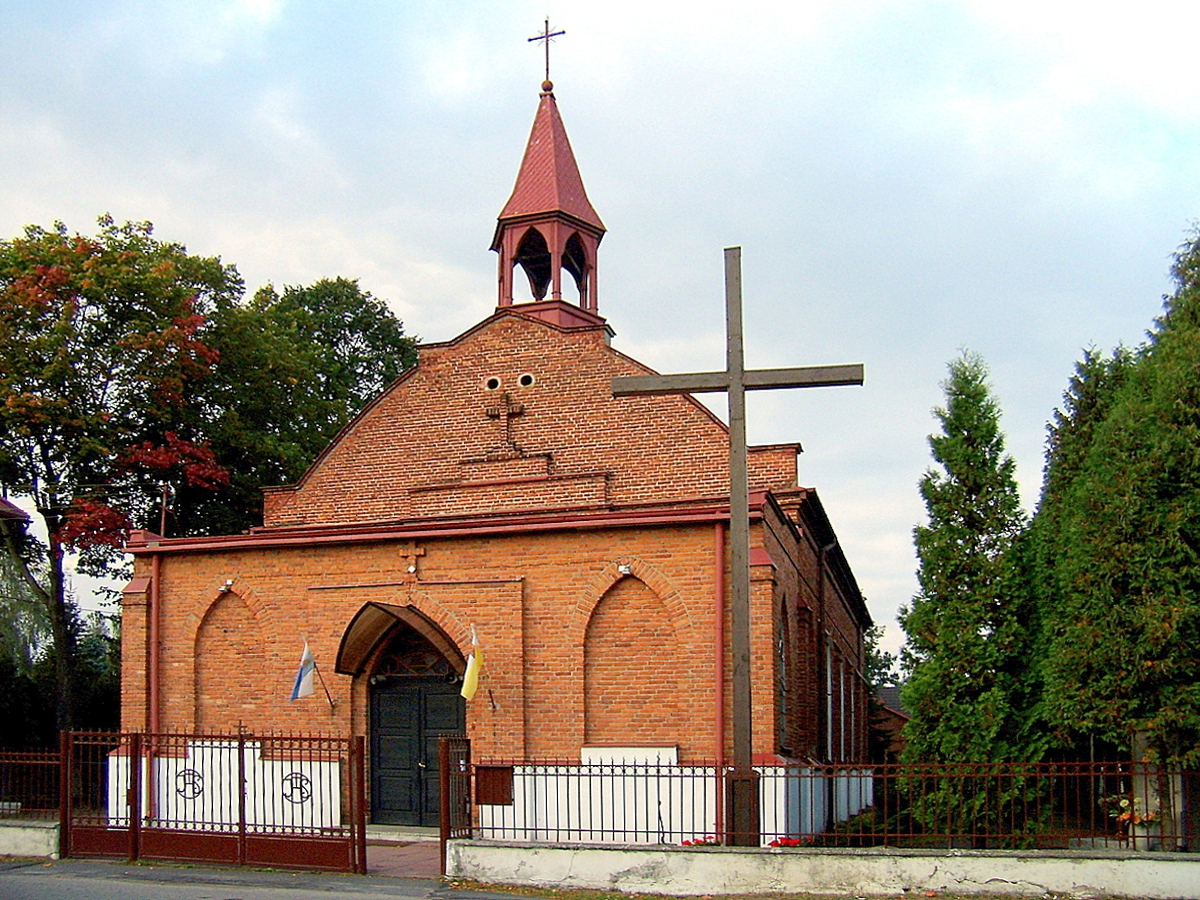
- Catholic church

- Location within Poland
- Coordinates: 51°36′50″N 19°20′20″E
- Country: Poland
- Voivodeship: Łódź
- County: Pabianice
- Gmina: Pabianice
- Population: 500

Pawlikowice [pavlikɔˈvit͡sɛ] is a village in the administrative district of Gmina Pabianice, within Pabianice County, Łódź Voivodeship, in central Poland.
