= Janowice, Pabianice County =

Janowice
- Village
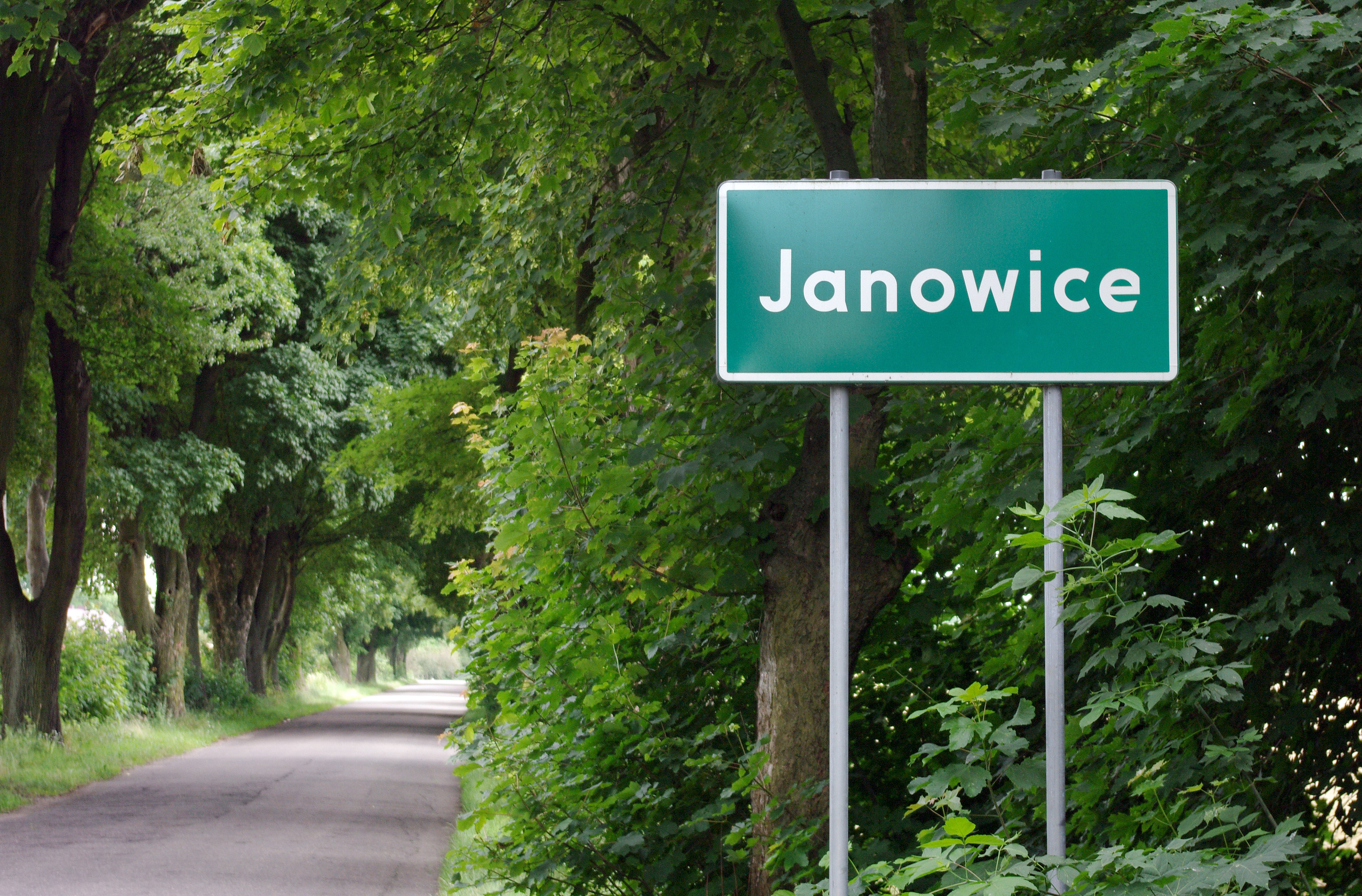

- Location within Poland
- Coordinates: 51°41′37″N 19°12′32″E
- Country: Poland
- Voivodeship: Łódź
- County: Pabianice
- Gmina: Pabianice
- Population: 150

Janowice [janɔˈvit͡sɛ] is a village in the administrative district of Gmina Pabianice, within Pabianice County, Łódź Voivodeship, in central Poland.
