= Okołowice, Łódź Voivodeship =

Okołowice
- Village
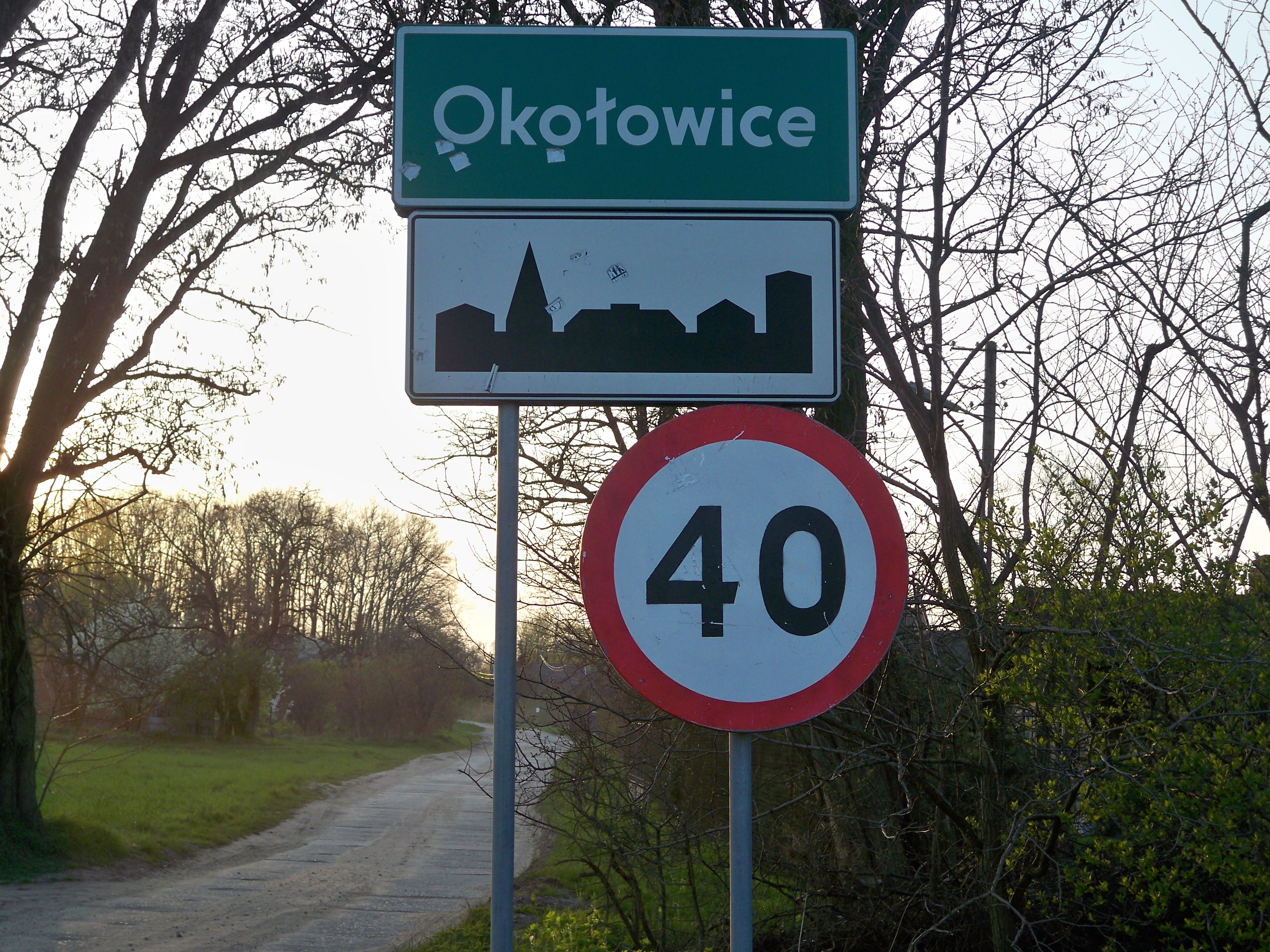

- Location within Poland
- Coordinates: 51°44′N 19°20′E
- Country: Poland
- Voivodeship: Łódź
- County: Pabianice
- Gmina: Pabianice

Okołowice [ɔkɔwɔˈvit͡sɛ] is a village in the administrative district of Gmina Pabianice, within Pabianice County, Łódź Voivodeship, in central Poland.
