= Petrykozy-Osiedle =

- Village
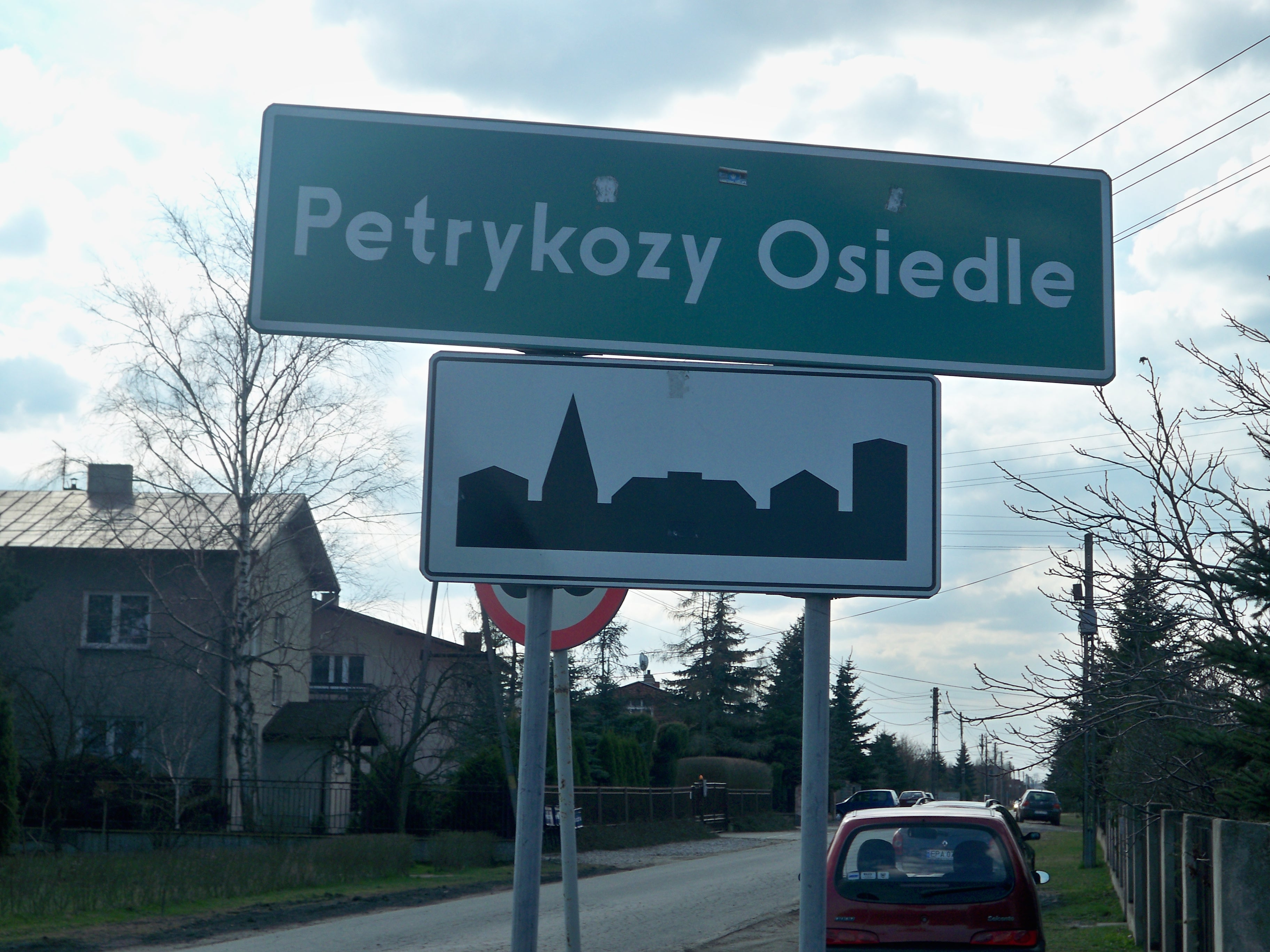

- Location within Poland
- Coordinates: 51°40′42″N 19°19′26″E
- Country: Poland
- Voivodeship: Łódź
- County: Pabianice
- Gmina: Pabianice

Petrykozy-Osiedle [pɛtrɨˈkɔzɨ ɔˈɕɛdlɛ] is a village in the administrative district of Gmina Pabianice, within Pabianice County, Łódź Voivodeship, in central Poland.
