= Wola Żytowska =

- Village
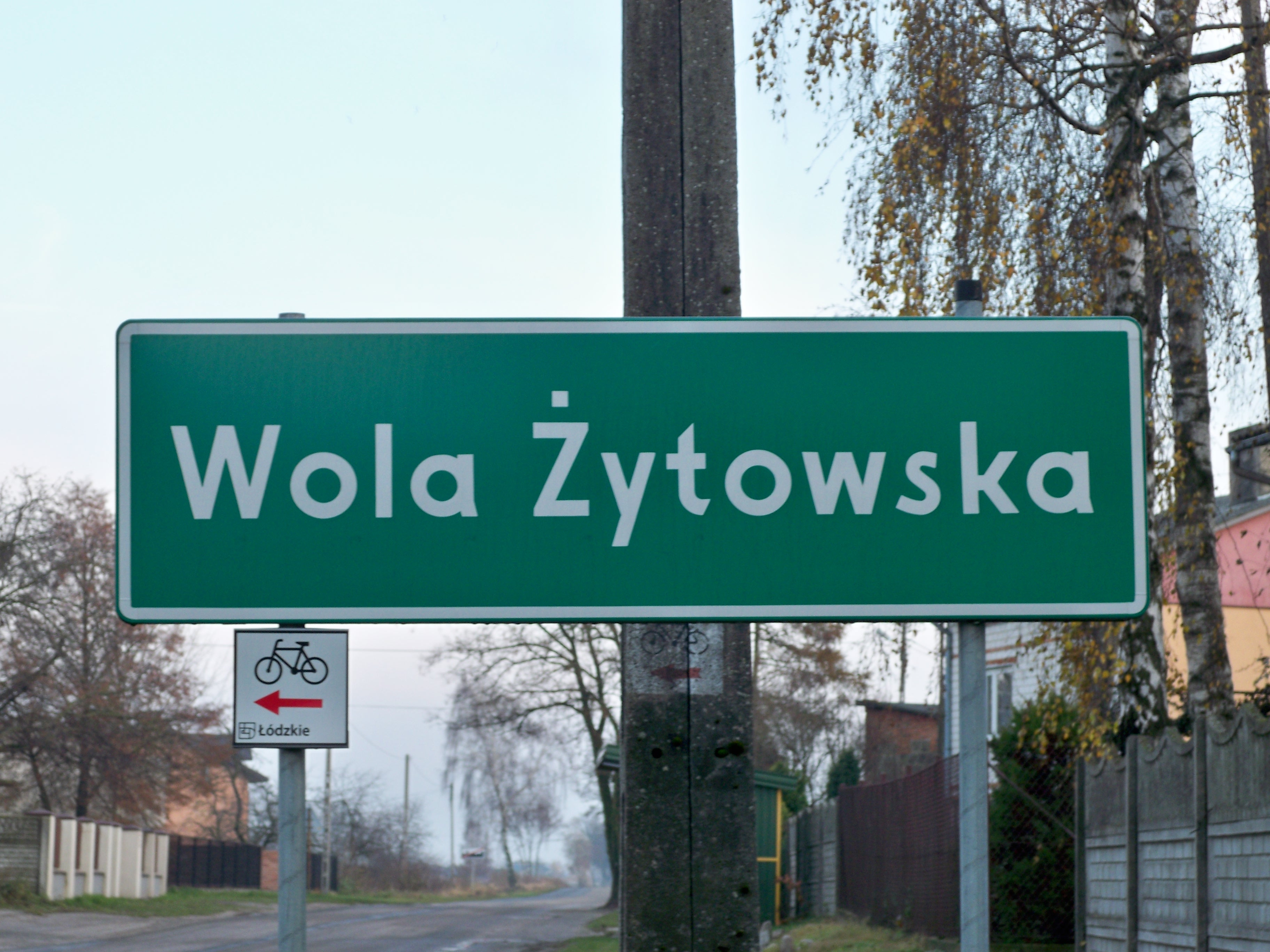

- Location within Poland
- Coordinates: 51°41′33″N 19°15′27″E
- Country: Poland
- Voivodeship: Łódź
- County: Pabianice
- Gmina: Pabianice

Wola Żytowska [ˈvɔla ʐɨˈtɔfska] is a village in the administrative district of Gmina Pabianice, within Pabianice County, Łódź Voivodeship, in central Poland.
