= Górka Pabianicka =

- Village
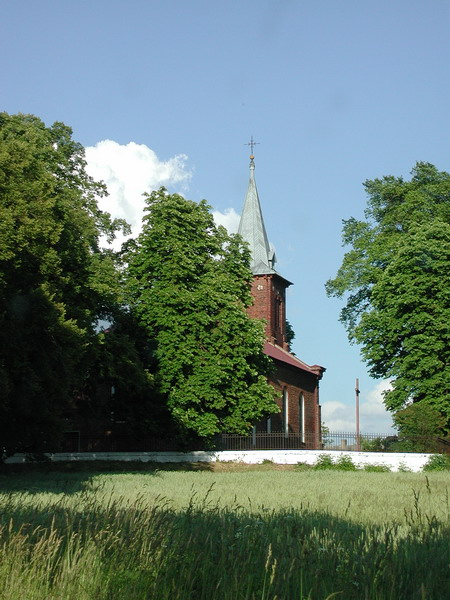
- Saint Martin Church

- Location within Poland
- Coordinates: 51°41′N 19°19′E
- Country: Poland
- Voivodeship: Łódź
- County: Pabianice
- Gmina: Pabianice

Górka Pabianicka [ˈɡurka pabjaˈnit͡ska] is a village in the administrative district of Gmina Pabianice, within Pabianice County, Łódź Voivodeship, in central Poland.
