= Świątniki, Pabianice County =

Świątniki
- Village
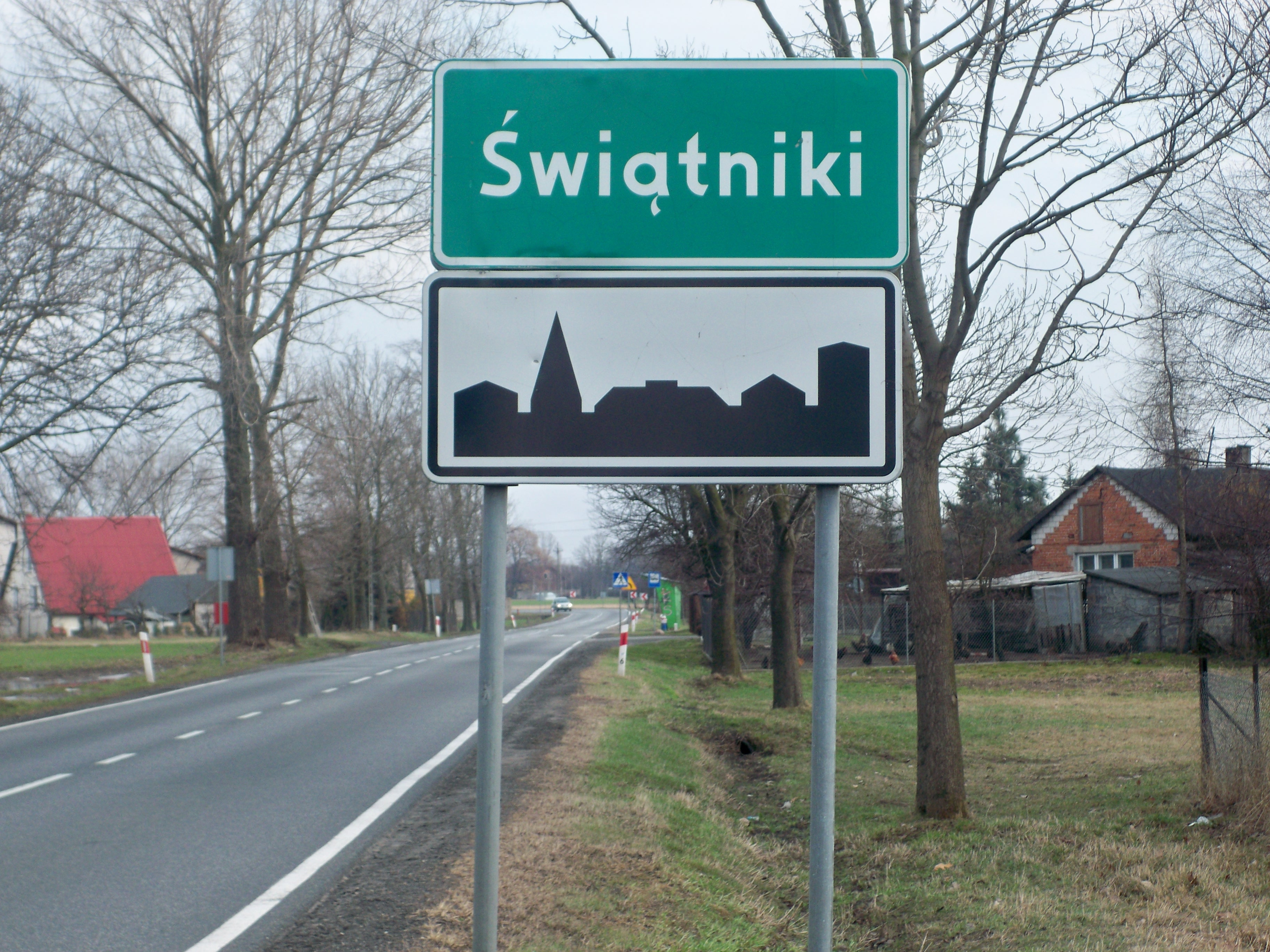
- Entrance sign

- Location within Poland
- Coordinates: 51°42′22″N 19°18′5″E
- Country: Poland
- Voivodeship: Łódź
- County: Pabianice
- Gmina: Pabianice

Świątniki (Polish pronunciation: [ɕfjɔntˈɲikʲi]) is a village in the administrative district of Gmina Pabianice, within Pabianice County, Łódź Voivodeship, in central Poland.
