= Władysławów, Pabianice County =

Władysławów
- Village
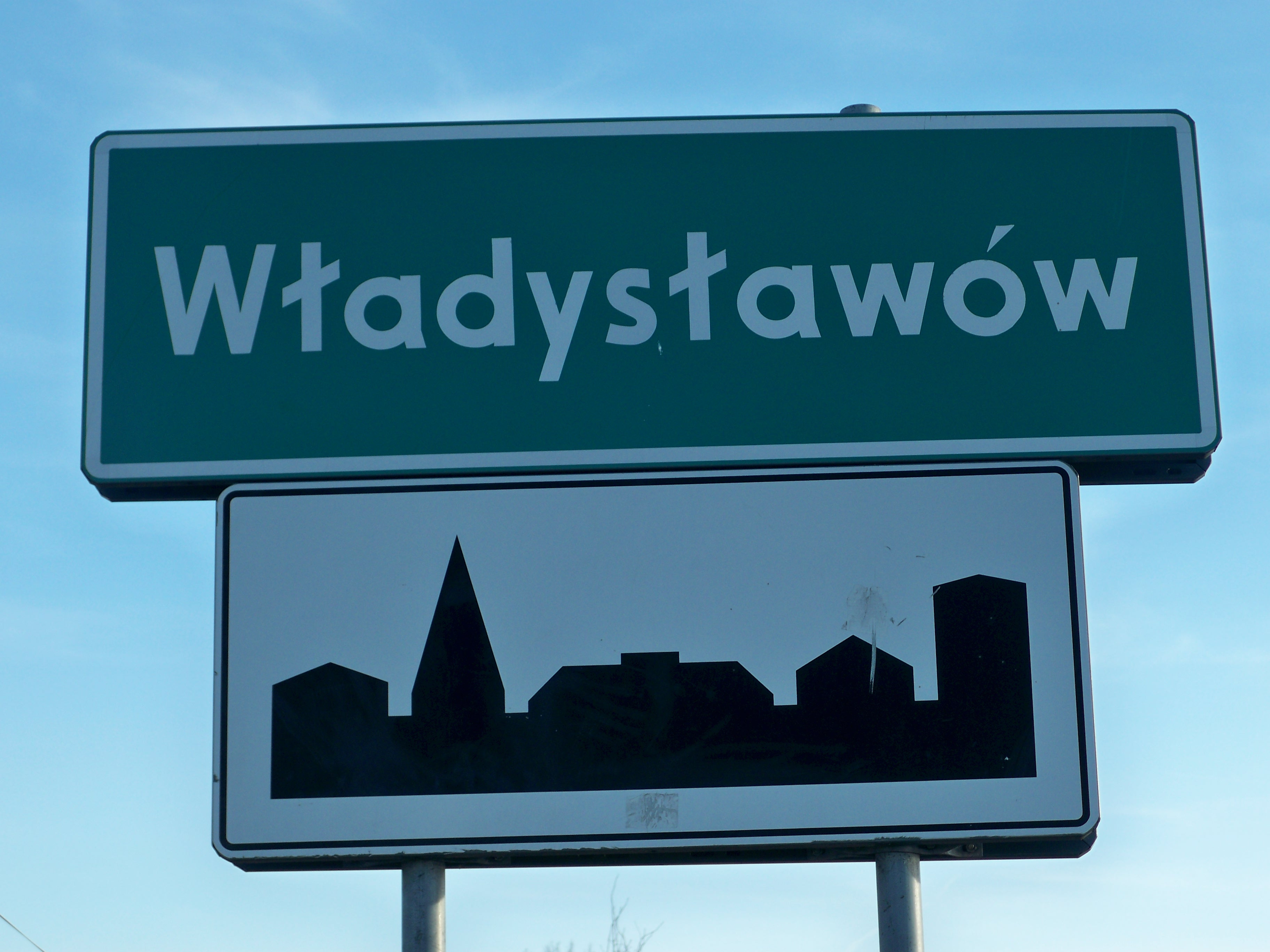

- Location within Poland
- Coordinates: 51°37′29″N 19°20′56″E
- Country: Poland
- Voivodeship: Łódź
- County: Pabianice
- Gmina: Pabianice
- Population: 50

Władysławów [vwadɨˈswavuf] is a village in the administrative district of Gmina Pabianice, within Pabianice County, Łódź Voivodeship, in central Poland.
