= Jadwinin, Łódź Voivodeship =

Jadwinin
- Village
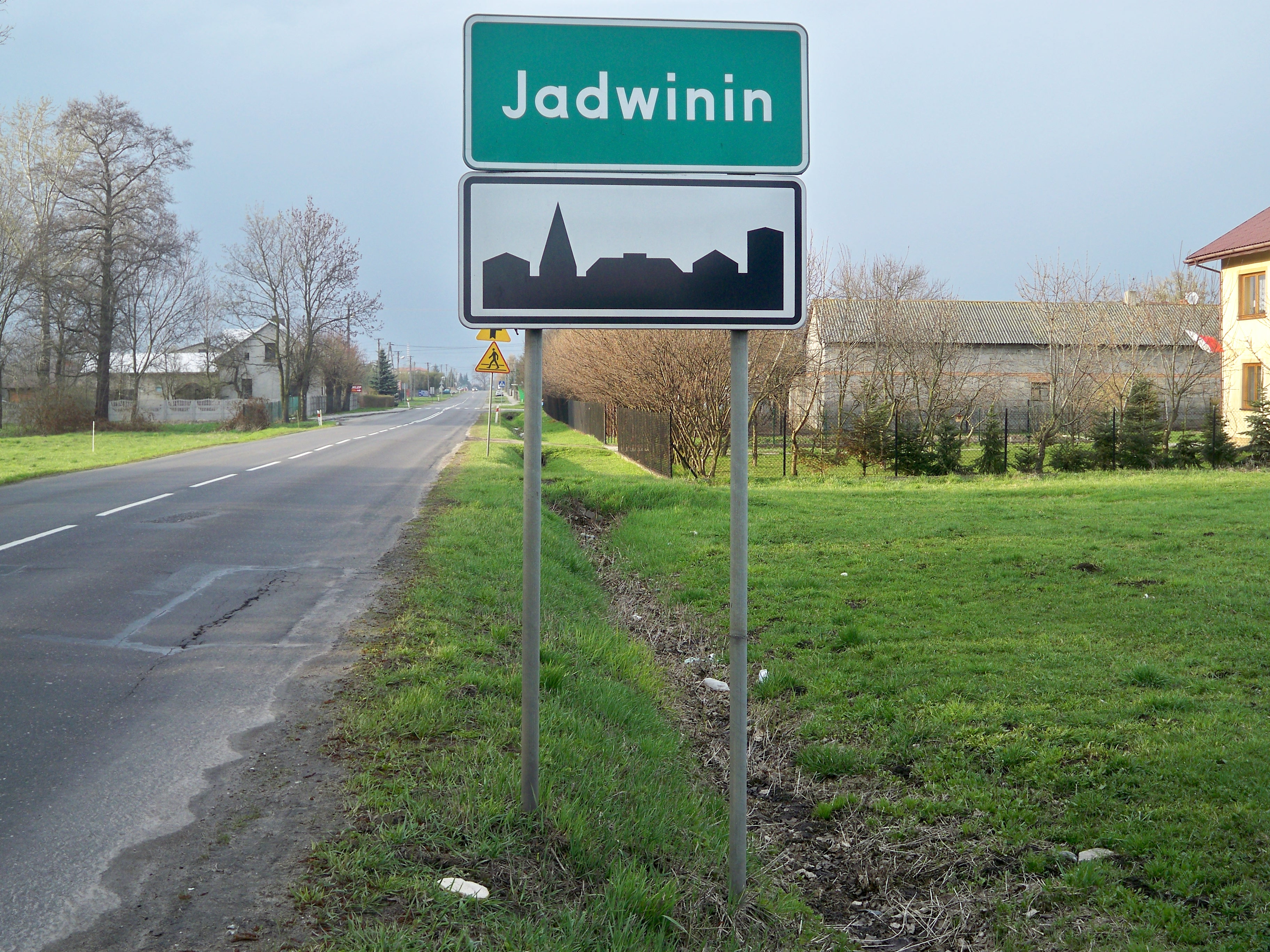

- Location within Poland
- Coordinates: 51°37′26″N 19°21′40″E
- Country: Poland
- Voivodeship: Łódź
- County: Pabianice
- Gmina: Pabianice
- Population: 230

Jadwinin [jadˈvinin] is a village in the administrative district of Gmina Pabianice, within Pabianice County, Łódź Voivodeship, in central Poland.
