= Gmina Pabianice =

Gmina Pabianice Pabianice Commune
- Gmina
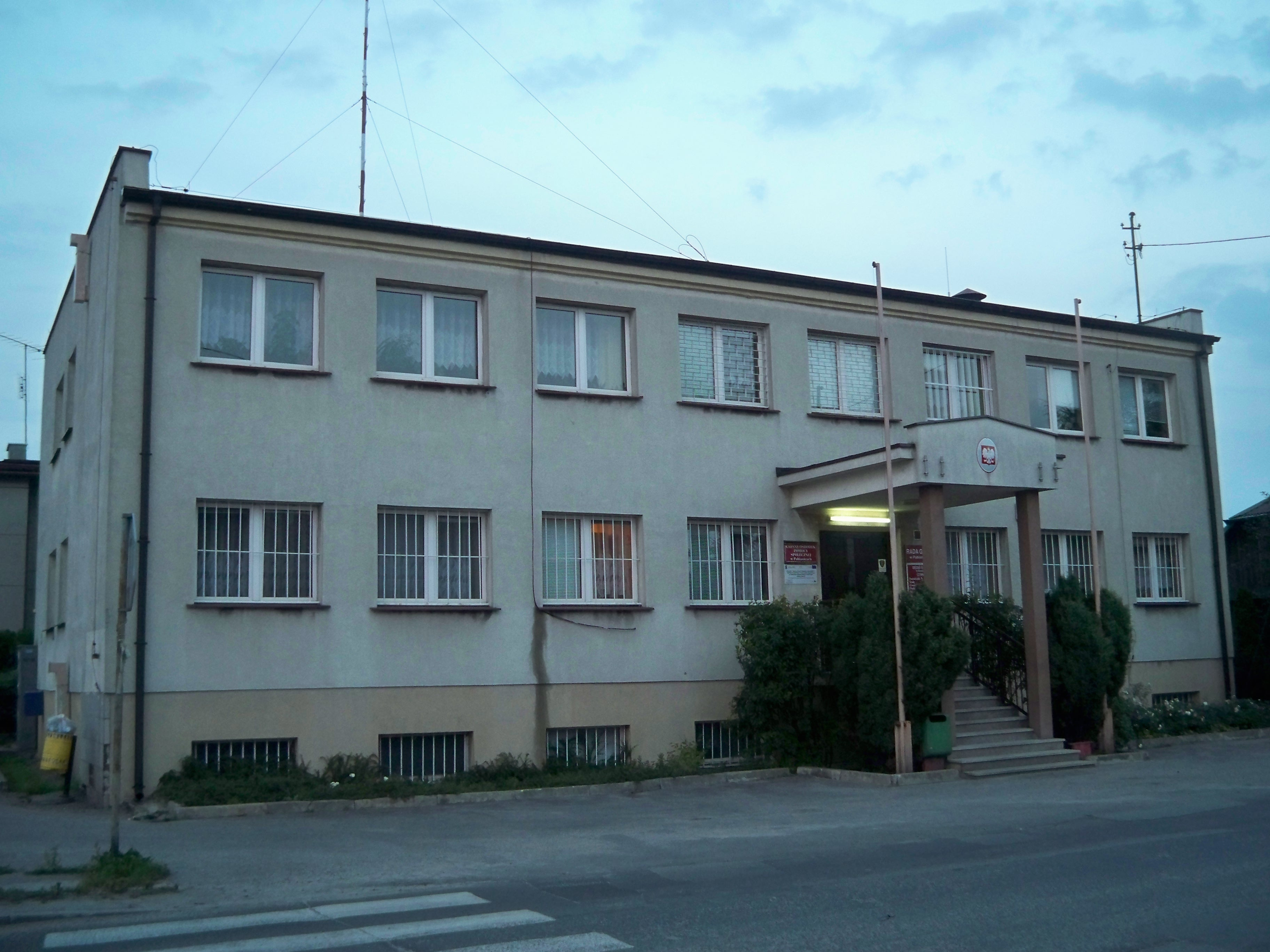
- Municipal hall

- Coat of arms
- Interactive map of Gmina Pabianice
- Coordinates (Pabianice): 51°39′N 19°23′E
- Country: Poland
- Voivodeship: Łódź
- County: Pabianice
- Seat: Pabianice

Area
  - Total: 88.57 km^{2} (34.20 sq mi)

Population (2006)
  - Total: 5,701
  - Density: 64.37/km^{2} (166.7/sq mi)
- Website: www.pabianice.gmina.pl

Gmina Pabianice is a rural gmina (administrative district) in Pabianice County, Łódź Voivodeship, in central Poland. Its seat is the town of Pabianice, although the town is not part of the territory of the gmina.

The gmina covers an area of 88.57 square kilometres (34.2 sq mi), and as of 2006 its total population is 5,701.

== Villages ==
Gmina Pabianice contains the villages and settlements of:

- Bychlew
- Górka Pabianicka
- Gorzew
- Hermanów
- Huta Janowska
- Jadwinin
- Janowice
- Konin
- Kudrowice
- Majówka
- Okołowice
- Osiedle Petrykozy
- Pawlikowice
- Petrykozy
- Piątkowisko
- Porszewice
- Rydzyny
- Świątniki
- Szynkielew
- Terenin
- Władysławów
- Wola Żytowska
- Wysieradz
- Żytowice

== Neighbouring gminas ==
Gmina Pabianice is bordered by the towns of Konstantynów Łódzki, Łódź and Pabianice, and by the gminas of Dłutów, Dobroń, Lutomiersk, Rzgów, Tuszyn and Wodzierady.
