= Terenin, Łódź Voivodeship =

Terenin
- Village
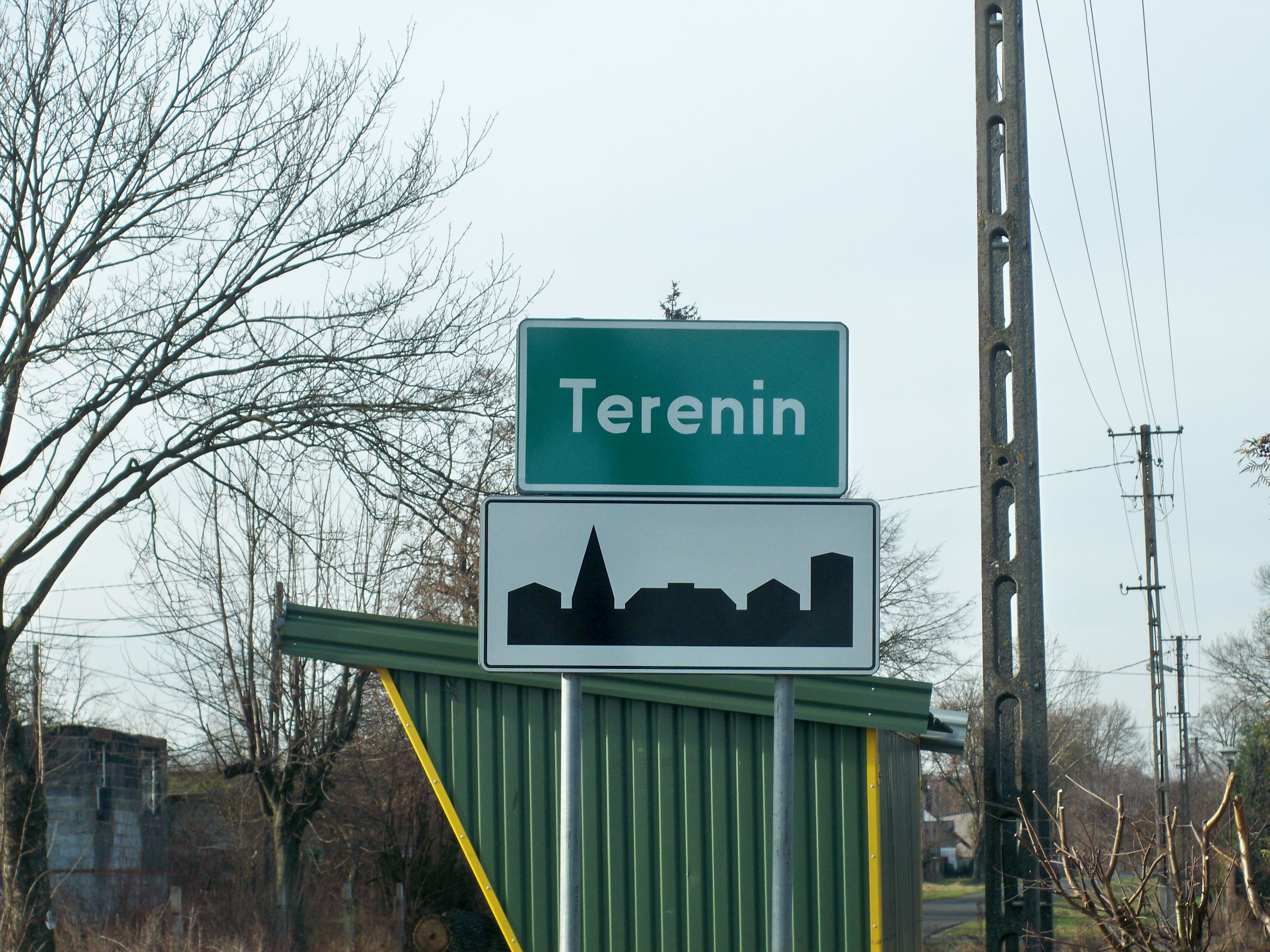

- Location within Poland
- Coordinates: 51°37′28″N 19°19′58″E
- Country: Poland
- Voivodeship: Łódź
- County: Pabianice
- Gmina: Pabianice
- Population: 80

Terenin [tɛˈrɛnin] is a village in the administrative district of Gmina Pabianice, within Pabianice County, Łódź Voivodeship, in central Poland.

On 1 June 2024 there was a reconstruction of Battle of Łódź. The main battle happened at 5 p.m.
