= Rydzyny =

- Village
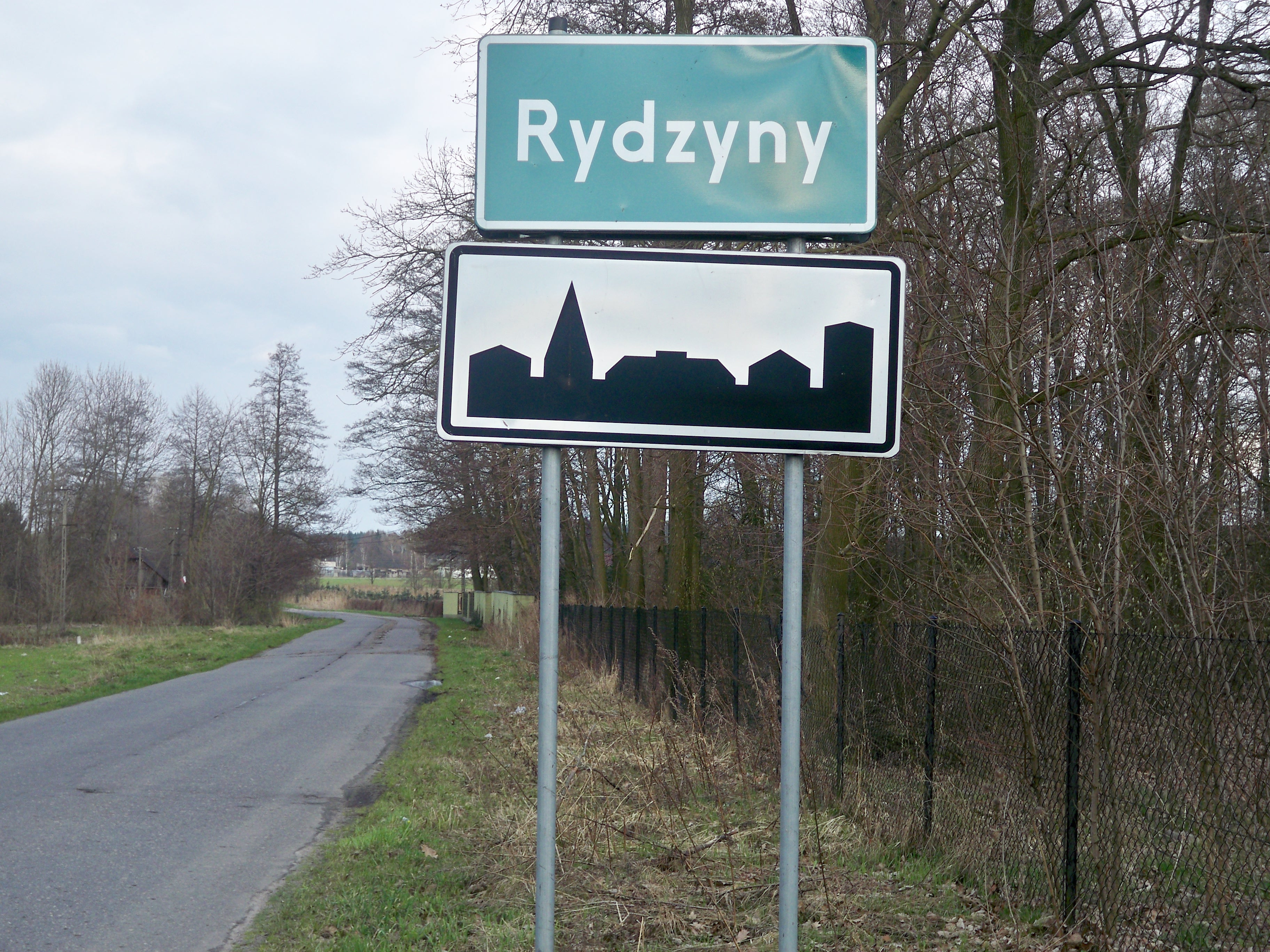

- Location within Poland
- Coordinates: 51°37′N 19°25′E
- Country: Poland
- Voivodeship: Łódź
- County: Pabianice
- Gmina: Pabianice

Rydzyny [rɨˈd͡zɨnɨ] is a village in the administrative district of Gmina Pabianice, within Pabianice County, Łódź Voivodeship, in central Poland.

The village consists of:

- Rydzyny Dolne
- Rydzyny Górne
- Rydzyny Długie
- Potaźnia
- Żabiniec
