= Majówka, Łódź Voivodeship =

Majówka
- Village
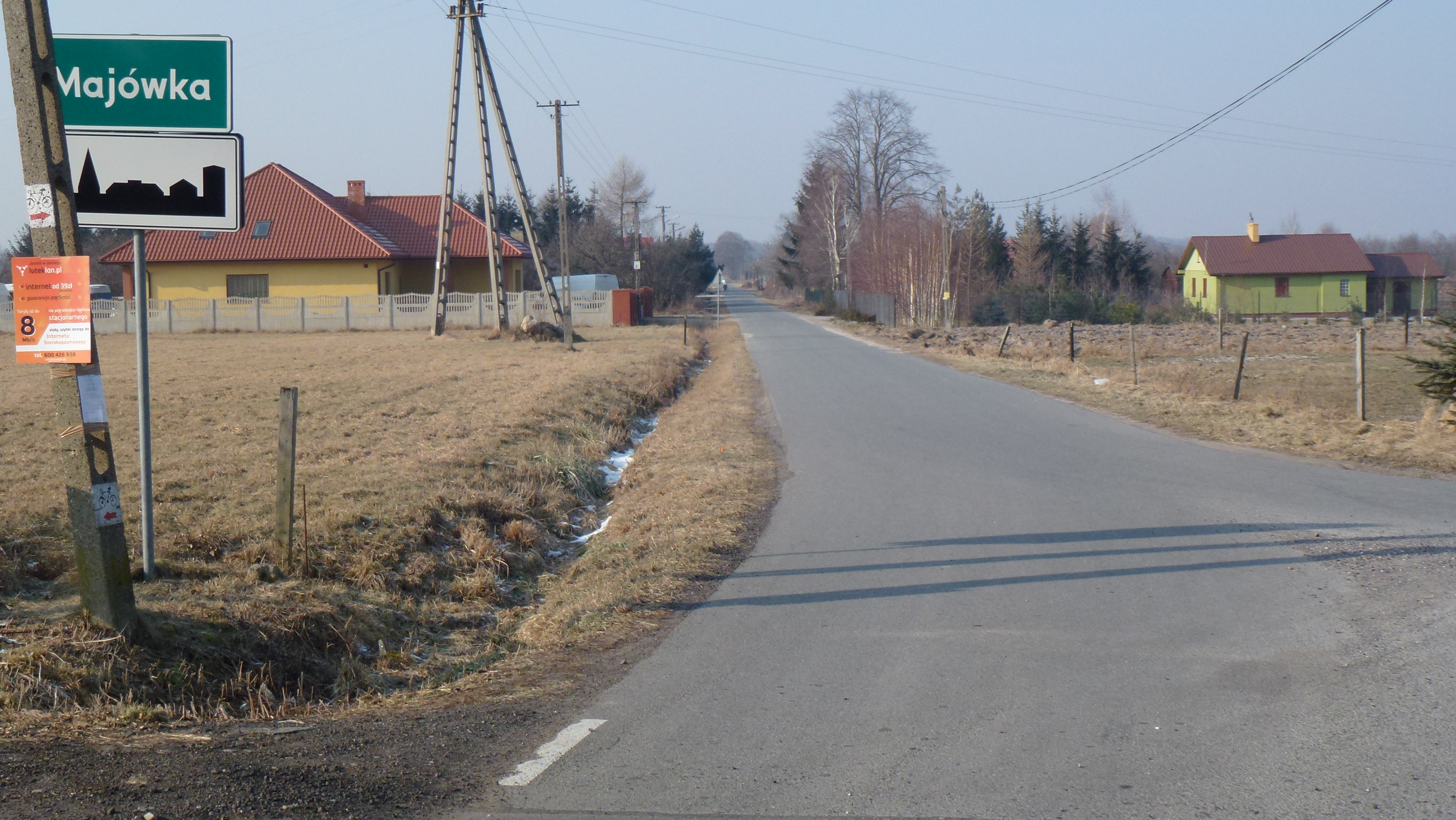

- Location within Poland
- Coordinates: 51°42′20″N 19°16′33″E
- Country: Poland
- Voivodeship: Łódź
- County: Pabianice
- Gmina: Pabianice
- Population: 70

Majówka [maˈjufka] is a village in the administrative district of Gmina Pabianice, within Pabianice County, Łódź Voivodeship, in central Poland.
