= Huta Janowska =

- Village
- Location within Poland
- Coordinates: 51°41′17″N 19°12′32″E
- Country: Poland
- Voivodeship: Łódź
- County: Pabianice
- Gmina: Pabianice

Huta Janowska [ˈxuta jaˈnɔfska] is a village in the administrative district of Gmina Pabianice, within Pabianice County, Łódź Voivodeship, in central Poland.
