= Hermanów, Łódź Voivodeship =

Hermanów
- Village
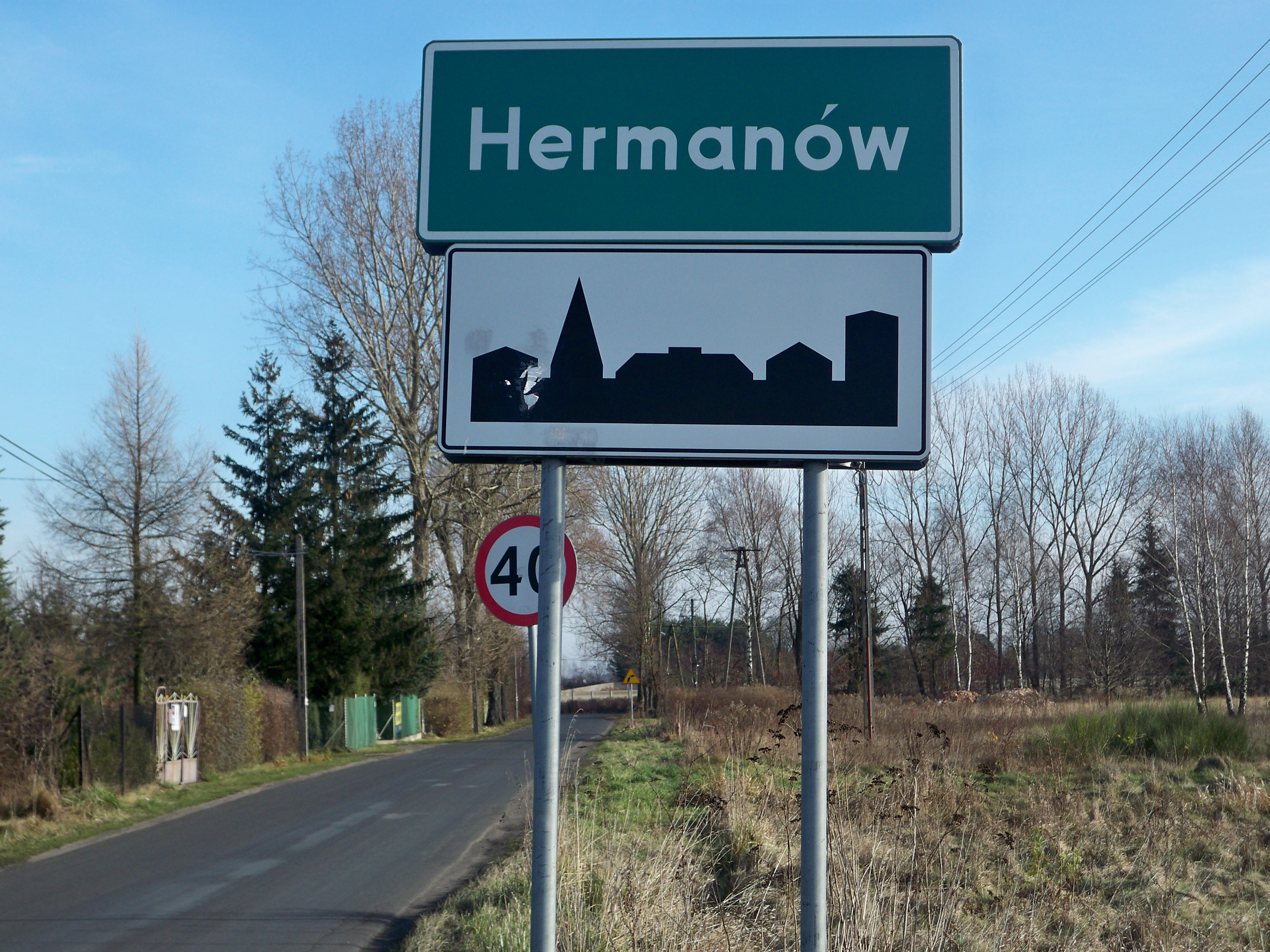

- Location within Poland
- Coordinates: 51°37′54″N 19°19′52″E
- Country: Poland
- Voivodeship: Łódź
- County: Pabianice
- Gmina: Pabianice

Hermanów [xɛrˈmanuf] is a village in the administrative district of Gmina Pabianice, within Pabianice County, Łódź Voivodeship, in central Poland.
