= Konin, Łódź Voivodeship =

Konin
- Village
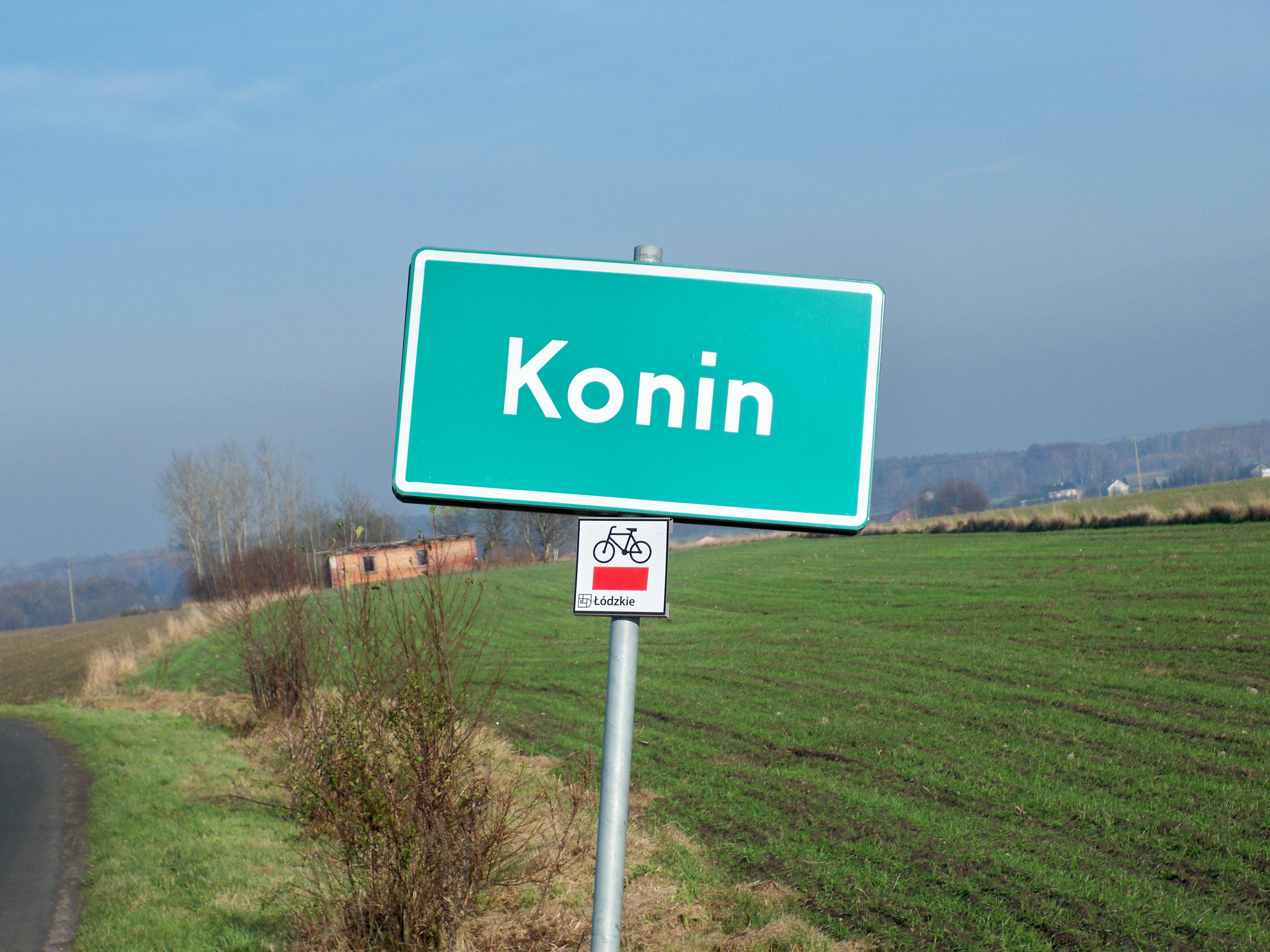

- Location within Poland
- Coordinates: 51°41′52″N 19°17′15″E
- Country: Poland
- Voivodeship: Łódź
- County: Pabianice
- Gmina: Pabianice
- Population: 90

Konin [ˈkɔnin] is a village in the administrative district of Gmina Pabianice, within Pabianice County, Łódź Voivodeship, in central Poland.
