= Petrykozy, Pabianice County =

Petrykozy
- Village
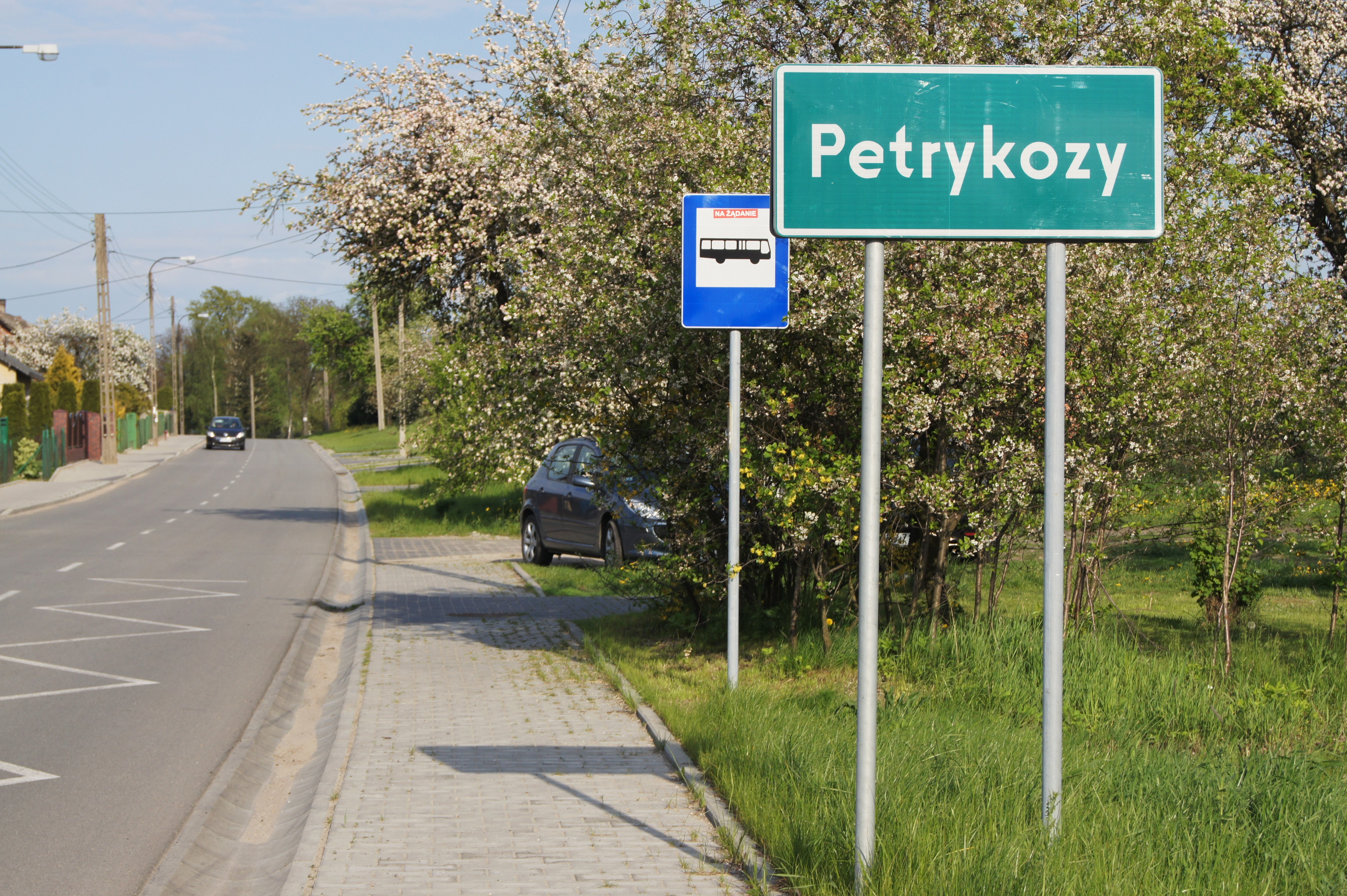

- Location within Poland
- Coordinates: 51°41′7″N 19°18′9″E
- Country: Poland
- Voivodeship: Łódź
- County: Pabianice
- Gmina: Pabianice
- Population: 310

Petrykozy [pɛtrɨˈkɔzɨ] is a village in the administrative district of Gmina Pabianice, within Pabianice County, Łódź Voivodeship, in central Poland.
