= Mokrosęk =

- Village
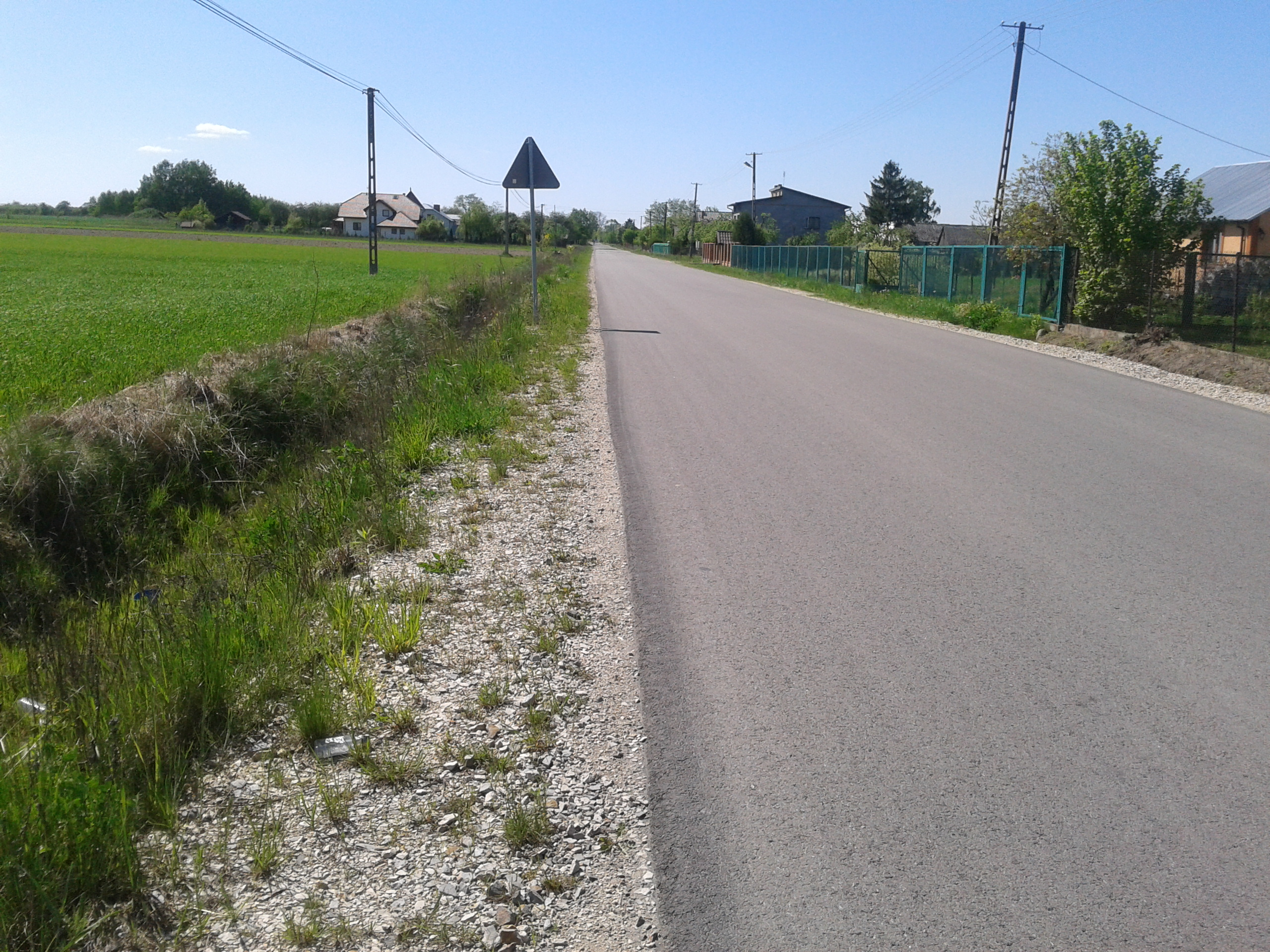

- Location within Poland
- Coordinates: 51°31′N 21°2′E
- Country: Poland
- Voivodeship: Masovian
- County: Radom
- Gmina: Jedlińsk
- Sołectwo: Mokrosęk

Area
  - Total: 55 km^{2} (21 sq mi)
- Elevation: 147 m (482 ft)

Population (2010)
  - Total: 224
  - Density: 4.1/km^{2} (11/sq mi)
- Time zone: UTC+1 (CET)
  - Summer (DST): UTC+2 (CEST)
- Postal code: 26-660

Mokrosęk ([mɔˈkrɔsɛŋk]; Latin: Mokrosang) is a village and sołectwo in the administrative district of Gmina Jedlińsk, within Radom County, Masovian Voivodeship, in east-central Poland. Sołectwo Mokrosęk contains two villages: Mokrosęk and Gryzów.

== Geography ==
Mokrosęk is located in the Radom Plain. Village covers a total area of 550 hectares (2.1 mi^{2}). A 5.2 km (3 mi) long Stara Błotnica - Jedlanka powiat road no. 1133W runs through the village, linking the village with the European route E77. Also a 59.8 km (37 mi) long Radomka Community Corporation's Bartodzieje - Uroczysko Grabina cycling trail runs through the village.

== History ==
For the first time Mokrosęk was mentioned in court records of 1411. The village was named then Mocrosank. Another reference is in 1508 tax records. The village is also mentioned in Jan Łaski's liber beneficiorum of 1511–1523.

Eight Polish citizens were murdered by Nazi Germany in the village during World War II.

== Demographics ==
Population of Mokrosęk (1775-2012)
| Year | Population | |
| Year | Mokrosęk | Sołectwo Mokrosęk (with Gryzów (Note: Gryzów was separated from Gutów folwark in 1881)) |
|---|---|---|
| 1775 | ca. 90 | – |
| 1827 | 80 | – |
| 1845 | 213 | – |
| 1907 | 470 | 521 |
| 1921 | 359 | 431 |
| 1940 | 415 | 459 |
| 1943 | N/A | 465 |
| 1947 | 304 | 369 |
| 1970 | N/A | 289 |
| 1971 | N/A | 289 |
| 1988 | N/A | 249 |
| 1998 | N/A | 249 |
| 2002 | N/A | 269 |
| 2009 | N/A | 253 |
| 2010 | 224 | 253 |
| 2012 | N/A | 255 |

Age structure of Mokrosęk (1971, 2010)
| Group | Share | |
| Group | 1971 | 2010 |
|---|---|---|
| 0–18 years | 28,0% | 25,4% |
| 18–59 years (females); 18–64 years (males) | 59,5% | 60,6% |
| 60 years and over (females); 65 years and over (males) | 12,5% | 14,0% |
