= White Croatia =

Land of White Croats in Eastern and Central Europe

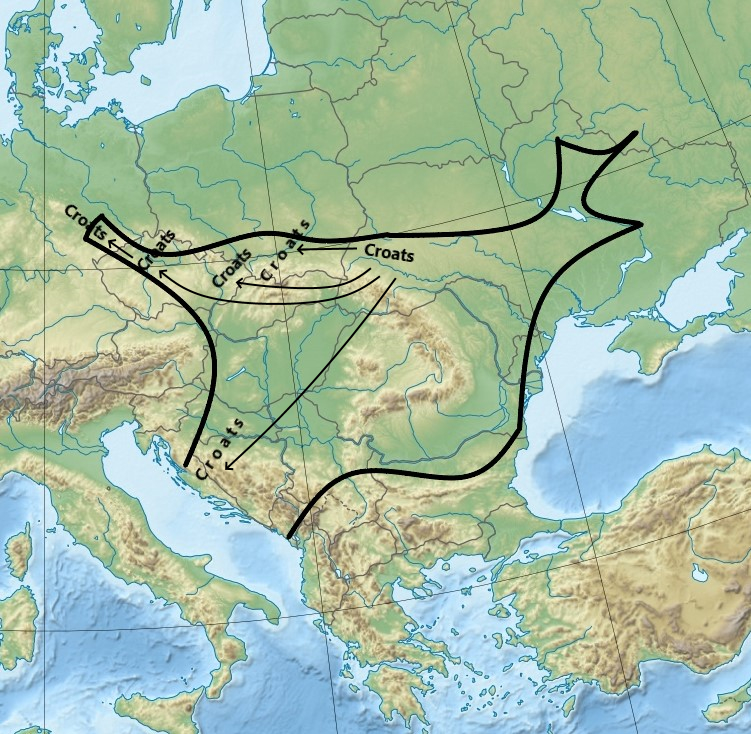
The range of Slavic ceramics of the Prague-Penkovka culture marked in black, all known ethnonyms of Croats are within this area. Presumable migration routes of Croats are indicated by arrows, per V. V. Sedov (1979).

White Croatia (also Great Croatia or Chrobatia; Croatian: Bijela Hrvatska, also Velika Hrvatska) is a historical region from which a portion of the White Croats emigrated to the area of modern-day Croatia and in which they lived between the 7th and 10th centuries.

According to recent archaeological and historiographical research, it is considered to have existed as a tribal proto-state with polis-like gords of Plisnesk, Stilsko, Revno, Halych, Terebovlia among others in Western Ukraine, which lasted until the very end of the 10th century. Some historians believe that, after the migration of the Croats in the 6th-7th century, their former homeland gradually lost its primacy, being influenced and assimilated by other Slavic peoples, such as Ukrainians (Kievan Rus'), Poles (Duchy of Poland) and Czechs (Great Moravia, Duchy of Bohemia). Others say there was never a distinct polity known as Great or White Croatia.

According to the medieval Chronicle of the Priest of Duklja, another area referred to as White Croatia was located south of Posavina along with Red Croatia in Dalmatia.

== Historical sources ==
The 10th-century treatise De Administrando Imperio ("On the management of the Empire", later DAI), written in Greek by Constantine VII Porphyrogennetos, is the only known document that suggests "White Croatia" as the place from which Croats migrated to Dalmatia, bordering the coastline of the Adriatic Sea. In Chapter 30, under the heading "The Story of the Province of Dalmatia," it says that "the Croats at that time were dwelling beyond Bagibareia, where the Belocroats are now... The rest of the Croats stayed over near Francia, and are now called the Belocroats, that is, the White Croats, and have their own archon; they are subject to Otto, the great king of Francia, which is also Saxony, and are unbaptized, and intermarry and are friendly with the Turks".

In Chapter 31, "Of the Croats and of the Country They Now Dwell in", it says that Croats in Dalmatia "are descended from the unbaptized Croats, also called the ‘white’, who live beyond Turkey and next to Francia, and they border the Slavs, the unbaptized Serbs... ancient Croatia, also called "white", is still unbaptized to this day, as are also its neighboring Serbs... constantly plundered by the Franks and Turks and Pechenegs... live far away from sea; it takes 30 days of travel from the place where they live to the sea. The sea to which they come down to after 30 days, is that which is called dark".

In Chapter 32, "Of the Serbs and of the Country They Now Dwell in," it was said about the unbaptized ("white") Serbs, that "their neighbor is Francia, as is also Megali Croatia, the unbaptized, also called 'white'".

Croatia Alba, or White Croatia, is referred to in the Latin Chronicle of the Priest of Duklja, compiled no earlier than the 12th century. This work refers to White Croatia as the lower part of Dalmatia (Croatia Alba, que et inferior Dalmatia dicitur), as opposed to Red Croatia, which refers to upper Dalmatia (Croatia Rubea, que et superior Dalmatia dicitur). According to 21st-century historian A. Mayorov, the territory of this Croatia Alba was the most developed and densely populated and formed the core of the emerging Croatian state.

In the undated part of the 12th-century Primary Chronicle, which tells about the resettlement of the Slavs from the Danube, White Croats were mentioned once, together with Serbs and Chorutans (Carinthians). According to A. Majorov, this account is based on Western European medieval tradition and agrees with the Chronicle of the Priest of Duklja.

In addition there are many other sources mentioning Croats inhabiting in Central Europe and Eastern Europe among East Slavic tribes, but none call them "white".

== Etymology ==
The origin and meaning of the epithets "white" for Croats and their homeland Croatia, as well "great" (megali) for Croatia is still debatable and needs further research. Usually it is considered to be in relation to the symbolism used in ancient times. "White" is related to the use of colors among Eurasian peoples to indicate cardinal directions. White meant "Western Croats/Croatia", in comparison to the lands to the east where they had lived. The epithet "great" probably signified the "old, ancient, former" homeland for the White Croats and newly arrived Croats to the Roman province of Dalmatia. Historian A. Majorov emphasizes that the term "White Croats" and the corresponding "White Croatia" are relatively new terms that were applied historically after the Croat migrated to new territories. According to the 10th-century document De Administrando Imperio, Croats who remained living in their former lands near the borders of Francia hadonly recently been called "White Croats".

However, in DAI there is seemingly no contradiction between "white" and "great" Croatia north of the Carpathians, possibly meaning the same in the perception of the Croats. In semantical comparison, as the color "white" besides the meaning "Western" of something/someone could also mean "younger" (later also associated with "unbaptized"), the association with "great" is contradictory. The ethnonym with the epithet was also questioned lexically and grammatically by linguists like Petar Skok, Stanisław Rospond, Jerzy Nalepa and Heinrich Kunstmann, who argued that the Byzantines did not differentiate Slavic bělъ- ("white") from velъ- ("big, great"), and because of common Greek betacism, the "Belohrobatoi" should be read as "Velohrobatoi" (Velohrovatoi; "Great/Old Croats"). The possible confusion could have happened if the original Slavic form velo- was transcribed to Greek alphabet and then erroneously translated, but although such a conclusion is not always accepted, others like Aleksandar Loma do not refute the possibility of erroneous transcription and translation.

== Dispute ==
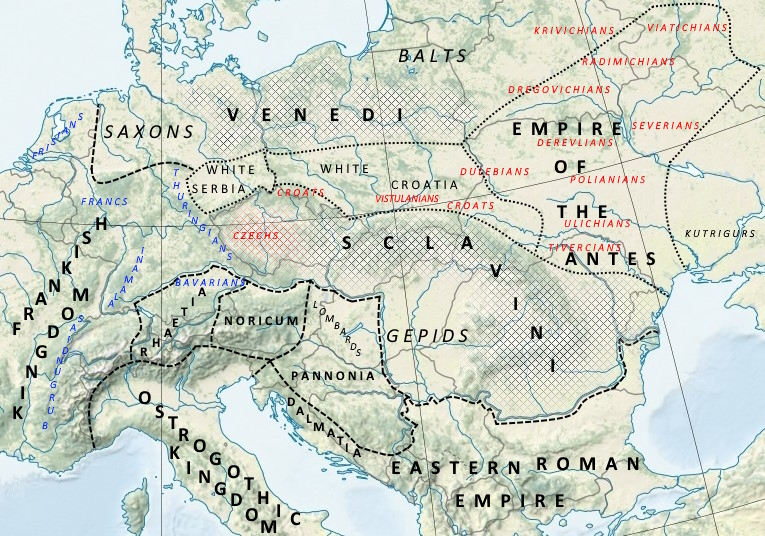
White Croatia and White Serbia around 560 AD, by Francis Dvornik (1949-56).

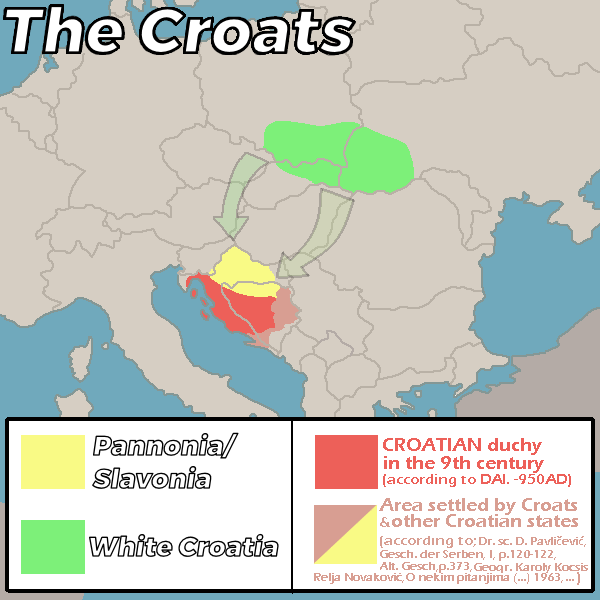
Migration routes of White Croats in the late 6th-early 7th century.

In 21st-century scholarship, historians do not agree on the location or even the existence of Great Croatia and White Croatia. Scholars do believe that the Croats gradually moved from the East to the West and South. According to Majorov, in the 10th century, the ethnic Croats are believed to have been surviving in remnant communities, scattered in the East in Ukraine, Poland and Slovakia, with others in the West in Bohemia. Given the tradition of using colours for cardinal directions, Leontii Voitovych argued that the Great Croatia referred to in the 6-7th century no longer existed in the 10th century. The term White Croatia was used to refer to the Western part of its territory. Some scholars such as F. Rački, M. Kos, L. Niederle and Nada Klaić believed in its existence, others such as V. Jagić, J. B. Bury, K. Jireček and A. Brückner have rejected the existence of an independent polity, while F. Westberg, J. Markwart, L. Hauptmann, H. Łowmiański believed in its existence in the sense Constantine VII was referring to the Duchy of Bohemia which in the 10th century controlled Southern Poland and Western Ukraine. Similarly, Valentin Sedov noted that there is no archaeological material to prove its existence. However, recent archaeological research of 7-10th century sites in Western Ukraine suggests otherwise, that Great Croatia most probably was a polycentric proto-state.

Interpretations have differed over what geographic area the term Bagibaria refers to. Some scholars have related it to Babia Góra near the river Vistula and Kraków in Lesser Poland, but it is commonly considered to be a reference to Bavaria. Tibor Živković notes that this term comes from the Latin name of Bavaria (Bagoaria and Baioaria) and, therefore, the source of this information for the De Administrando Imperio could be of West European/Western Roman origin (possibly by Anastasius Bibliothecarius from Rome). According to Živković it is evident that the observer of the information beyond Bavaria was not based in Constantinople because it would imply lands northwest of Bavaria and not northeast where Croats lived, showing that the source of information was in Rome. To the similar conclusion previously came Łowmiański, saying that to the Western viewpoint beyond Bavaria (to the East) is contrasted beyond Turkey (north of Hungary) from the Byzantine viewpoint.

Another dispute regards the "sea to which they come down to after 30 days, is that which is called dark". Some scholars believe this is a reference to the Baltic Sea, while others claim it is the Black Sea. From Lesser Poland, it was claimed that it would have been possible to reach the Baltic in fifteen days, and that the Black Sea would have been about 30 days of travel from Prykarpattia (the river San, Upper Dniester and city of Przemyśl). However, if one takes Kraków as the starting point, and a day's walk in antiquity as between 26-40 kilometers, within 30 days would be easier to arrive to Gdańsk on the Baltic Sea than Odesa on the Black Sea. This evidence, along with the more natural route to the Baltic Sea, no mention of northern neighbours of the Croats, and possible lack of access to the Black Sea because of the presence of Pechenegs, has led some to argue that the Baltic Sea is more likely. Additionally, at the time the De Administrando Imperio was written, the Byzantines did not refer to the Black Sea as "Black" or "Dark", but by a word meaning "Hospitable" (Εὔξεινος, a euphemism for "Inhospitable"). They also used a different term for the word "sea": "Πόντος" (Póntos), not "θάλασσα" (Thálassa). However, the name "dark" could indicate usage of a source other than Byzantine, and does not necessarily mean it is not a reference to the Black Sea. Some scholars consider it more likely a reference to the Black Sea for a few other reasons: the De Administrando Imperio makes no reference to the Baltic Sea; the chapter as a whole has information usually found in 10th century Arabian sources like of Al-Masudi; the Black Sea was of more interest to the Eastern merchants and Byzantine Empire; and its Persian name "Dark Sea" (axšaēna-) was already well known. Some Arabian-Persian sources also describe a large Slavic state with a city called Khordab ten days from the Pechenegs, having a river and bounded by mountains - if one takes the river to be the Dniester and the mountains to be the Carpathians, this would place the Croats and their homeland in Prykarpattia.

The De Administrando Imperio has other contradictory information. It describes the Croats as living near the Franks in the West and bordered by the Hungarians on the south, while also claiming the Croats were subject to repeated raids by the Pecheneg, who are said to live north of the Hungarians. These chapters are known to have been based on several archival sources. The 19th century scholars, and later Łowmiański, Sedov, and Majorov, among others, concluded that the De Administrando Imperio mistakenly referred to 7th-century location and migration of the Croats based on partial information of their location in the 9-10th century, and that the account was compiled from different sources. Francis Dvornik (1956) thought that in the mid-6th century White Croatia included territory between Dniester and Lusatian Neisse rivers, but other scholars conclude that the Croats in the 7th century did not yet live near the territory of Bohemia; and Łowmiański thought the location of Bohemia and existence of the Croats was disputable even in the 10th century. Živković emphasized that White Croatia in the 7th century could not border Francia because "the Frankish borders had been far more towards the west." Frankish sources also do not mention anything about the Croats, implying they must have lived much further to the East. Łowmiański criticized some historians for primarily relying on and using a source from the South - the De Administrando Imperio - instead of many other sources from the North, which are more reliable for determining the location of the Croats and Croatia. Those northern sources mention Croats and Croatia at the Carpathian Mountains and never around the river Elbe.

In the 13th chapter, which describes the Croats as having Hungarians neighbors with Franks to the west, Pechenegs to the north, and Moravians to the south, the De Administrando Imperio also claims that "on the other side of the mountains, the Croats are neighboring the Turks." Taken together, this account does not make much logical sense, but most probably refers to Croats living "on the other side" of Carpathian Mountains.

=== Territory versions ===
Polish historians have tended to disagree with Ukrainian and Russian historians on the extent of White Croat territory. The Ukrainian and Russian scholars have tended to attribute the Croats with large and influential territories in the East, while Polish and Czech scholars tended to diminish the existence of the Croats in their countries. Polish scholars avoided locating the Croats near Kraków and also thought the Croats did not border Ruthenia, claiming that if it did, Vladimir the Great's attack on the Croats in 992 would have been perceived as a call for war by Bolesław I the Brave. Polish and Russian-Ukrainian historians also disagree on whether the Cherven Cities were inhabited by the Lendians or White Croats, and were independent from both Poland and Kievan Rus'. Regardless, White Croatia was initially thought to have been located along the Upper Elbe river in Northeastern Bohemia and/or around the Upper Vistula valley in Lesser Poland. This is based only on De Administrando Imperio's description that they lived northeast of Bavaria, North of Hungary, and South of the White Serbs. Also related are trends in disagreements among Polish and Czech historians, as the former negated the existence of Croats in Poland and latter maintained that they existed near Sudetes in Czech Republic. However, due to information from other sources, in the 19th century it became commonly held that the Croats lived North and East of Carpathians, specifically Prykarpattia and Eastern Galicia.

In the 19th and early 20th century, Pavel Jozef Šafárik and Lubor Niederle combined both Eastern and Western concept on the localization of White Croatia, concluding that it extended from Eastern Galicia up to Northeastern Bohemia. Niederle placed White Croats in Prykarpattia, arguing that they were mainly located on the river Vistula, between Czech and Ukrainian Croats, and that they formed one big alliance of Croatian tribes which fell apart when the Vistulan Croats migrated to the Western Balkans in the 7th century. Josef Markwart and Ljudmil Hauptmann also placed the White Croat main center on the Vistula. Polish historians mostly disagreed, arguing that the theory was based on loose evidence, and as such ignored Croats and White Croatia in their synthesis of the Polish history. They were in accordance with Czech and German historians, who considered the White Croats to be related to the Slavník dynasty on the Upper Elbe river, and thought that those Croats came from Ukrainian Croats on the river Dniester - a theory which contradicted with Ukrainian and Russian historians. A. A. Šahmatov, S. M. Seredonjin and others located Croatia in Eastern Galicia.

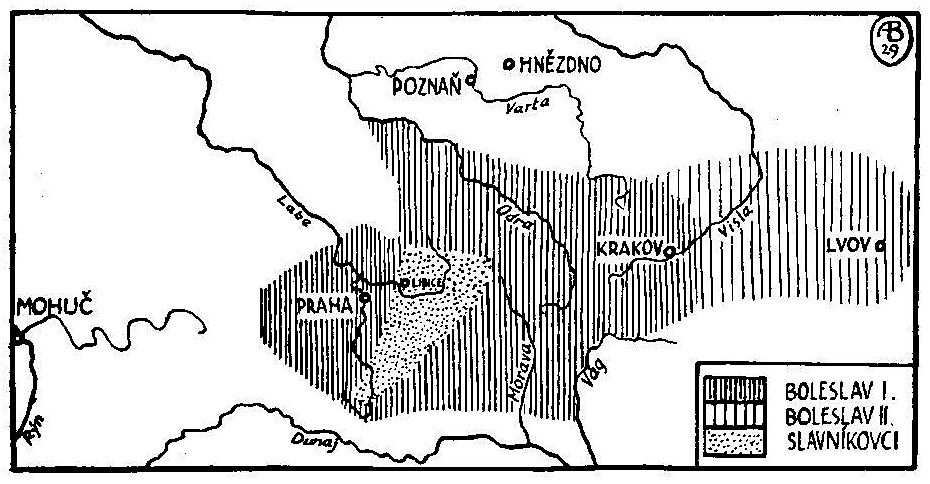
Borders of Duchy of Bohemia and Slavník dynasty under Boleslaus I and Boleslaus II of Přemyslid dynasty.

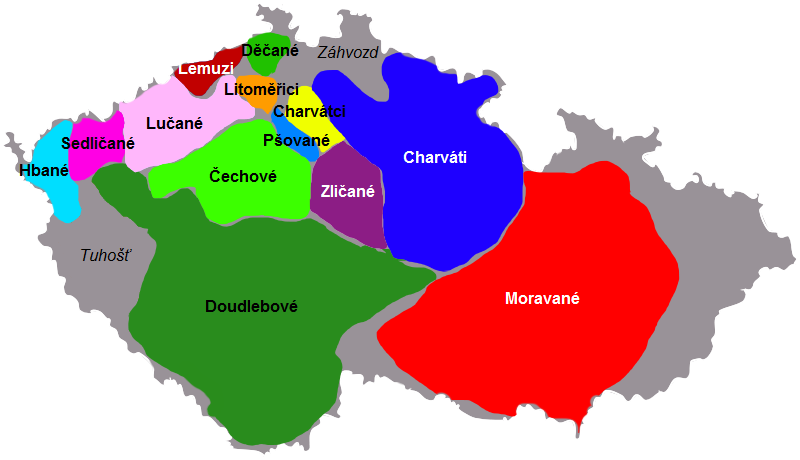
The presumed, but disputable, location of Croatian tribes (blue, yellow) in present-day Czech Republic during the 10th century, per abandoned hypothesis about the Czech tribes.

In the late 20th and early 21st centuries, Dušan Třeštík and Gerard Labuda identified White Croatia with the multi-tribal realm of Boleslaus I, Duke of Bohemia, while Třeštík and Jaroslav Bakala more precisely located them in present-day Silesia and North Bohemia (Podkrkonoší region). Richard Ekblom also placed them in Upper Silesia and the area of Kraków. Tadeusz Lehr-Spławiński mostly agreed with Niederle's location around the Vistula river. Francis Dvornik placed White Croatia in Galicia; specifically, its western part in Western Galicia with Kraków up to the Northeastern Bohemian domain of the Slavnik dynasty, and its eastern part in Eastern Galicia (Upper Dniester). Łowmiański, besides Prykarpattia and Zakarpattia, placed the main part of the Croats in the Upper Vistula valley in Lesser Poland, and claimed that the accounts in DAI identified White Croatia with Duchy of Bohemia of Boleslaus I which at the time incorporated the territory of the Vistulans and Lendians, because they were attacked by the Pechenegs. He claimed that according to the sources it is uncertain whether the White Croats lived around the Elbe river, and instead placed them in Sudetes. Łowmiański also emphasized that their localization in Silesia is theoretical construction without basis in the sources. Ivo Goldstein located White Croatia around Kraków. According to Noel Malcolm, White Croatia was in the area of today's southern Poland. Krzysztof Fokt placed them in Upper Silesia in the 9th-10th century. Petr Charvát located them in Northern and Eastern Bohemia, noting that the Croat diaspora settlement follows the Carpathian range from Southeastern Poland to the Giant Mountains in Bohemia. T. Živković located White Croatia in Bohemia and Southern Poland as well, but also noted anachronistic parallels with the 9-10th century Duchy of Bohemia. A. Majorov distinguishes between the terms and concepts of "Great Croatia" and "White Croatia". He agrees that White Croatia and those Croats identified as "White" were a second concept appearing to have some historical presence in the Upper Elbe and Upper Vistula regions, but that Great Croatia, the motherland of the Croats, was primary concept located in Eastern Prykarpattia and Tisza river basin in Zakarpattia. Majorov suggests that the author of the De Administrando Imperio made an attempt to reconcile the contradictions among various conflicting sources. Sedov believed that the Croats arose among the Antes of Penkovka culture. After that, they migrated West and settled in several groups in various places. In 1982, argued that one of these groups were Southwestern neighbours of the Dulebes, living in the Northern and Southern area of Eastern Prykarpattia. Ukrainian and Russian historians and archaeologists generally argued that Great Croatia, also in the sense of homeland from where Carpathian Croats emigrated to the Balkans, included almost all the lands of later historical region of Galicia.

N. P. Barsov situated the Croats in the wide area of Carpathian Mountains: on the slopes of Tatra Mountains to the river Tisza and Prut in the South, to the Dniester to the East, and the Vistula to the North. Many prominent scholars, including P. Šafárik, L. Niederle, V. Gruby, T. Lehr-Spławiński, B. Rybakov and V. Korolyuk thought that the lands originally inhabited by the Croats stretched from Western Bug and Upper Prut and Siret in the East up to Nisa and Upper Elbe in the West. According to Francis Dvornik, White Croatia extended from the Southern Bug and the Wieprz and San rivers along the Poland-Ukraine border, to the slopes of Carpathian Mountains, including the Northern part of Slovakia, then from the rivers Netolica and Dudleba in upper Vltava, through Cidlina to the Krkonoše Mountains to the North and North-West. O. A. Kupchynsʹkyĭ believed that Eastern Croats had territory including Prykarpattia (that is, the confluence of the Laborec and Ondava rivers at the crest of the Carpathian Mountains), the valley of the Beskids, the western bank of the Wisłoka, and along the Sandomierz valley until middle San, near Dunajec and left bank of Vistula. He claimed they also likely occupied the upper watershed of the Tisza river at the Ukraine-Slovakia border. In other words, the Croats' land was much of the lands of present-day Western Ukraine, Southeastern Poland and Northeastern Czechia. Sedov sharply criticized Kupchynsʹkyĭ's assumptions, saying "these hypothetical constructions are now of purely historiographic interest, since they do not find any confirmation in archaeological materials".

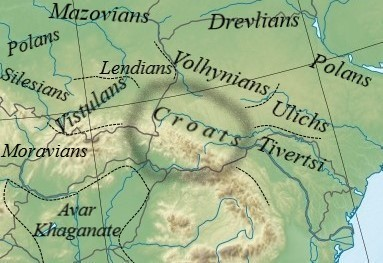
Territorial and ethnic border of White Croats according to Ukrainian archaeologists and historians (1995-2019).

Because of recent archaeological research into material culture and conclusions about the ethno-tribal affiliation and territorial borders of the Carpathian region from 6th until 10th century, Ukrainian archaeologists generally consider the tribal territory of the Croats ("Great Croatia") to have included Prykarpattia and Zakarpattia. They locate its eastern border as the Upper Dniester basin, its southeastern border on the Khotyn upland (beginning near Chernivtsi on the Prut River and ending in Khotyn on the Dniester River), its northern border at the watershed of the Western Bug and Dniester River, and its western border in the Western Carpathian ridges at the Wisłoka River. The Ukrainian historians also claim the Croats' tribal neighbors were the Tivertsi in the Eastern Bukovina, the Ulichs in Eastern Podolia, the Dulebes-Buzhans-Volhynians in the north along Upper Bug River, the Lendians in the northwest, and the Vistulans in the west. The analysis of housing types, and especially oven cookers in Western Ukraine which "were made out of stone (the Middle and the Upper Dnister areas), or clay (mud and butte types, Volynia)", differentiates main tribal alliances of Croats and Volhynians, but also Croats from Tiversti and Drevlians.

There also scholars, mainly Polish, who place the Croats further to the east, in the direction of Vyatichi, while locating the Lendians in Upper San and Upper Dniester or whole of Western Ukraine. Other historians dispute this claim, saying it is not well founded. In Polish historiography, especially in the mid-1940s, the location of the Lendians has been used to establish the legitimacy of Polish claims to the Ukrainian border area.

Nada Klaić thought the Croats had migrated from Carantania, rather than from East and West Slavic territory, but this idea has been rejected by both older and newer generations of historians.

=== Toponyms and anthroponyms ===
The extensive toponomastic studies, and their critical review by Henryk Łowmiański, show existence of several toponyms of settlements in Poland and Czech Republic whose origin presumably could be related to the Croatian toponym in pre-modern historical period. These are in Poland: Klwaty (Krwathi, Chrwathi Phirleonis), Klwatka Szlachecka (Krhwathi Powałya, Chrwathi), Klwatka Królewska (Krwathka, Chrwatka) around the city of Radom, Chirwatowa Wola today's Chyrowa near Wisłoka river, and Horwaty part of Czarna between San and Dniester river. In Czech Republic: two Charvátce near Ohře river, Charvátec near city of Dobrovice on river Elbe, Charvâty and Charváty near Morava river. In Czech Republic only the toponyms in Moravia have the archaic tribal names, while in Bohemia are derivations, implying were formed on the periphery or outside of the Croatian territory, and all of them only since the 9-10th century when was the expansion of Great Moravia and Duchy of Bohemia. Based on the toponyms (and historical sources), the homeland of Croatian tribes would have been in today's Southeastern Poland and Western Ukraine. In literature are mentioned also other Eastern European toponyms but with doubtful etymological relation with Croatian ethnonym, for example those with root "Charb-" (Charbce, Charbicze, Charbin, Charbowo), "Karw-" (Karwacz, Karwatyno/Charwatynia, Karovath), "Choro-" (Chorovjatinskaja/Chorowiacka, Chorow, Chorowa gora, Chorowica, Chorowiec etc.), "Horo-" (Horovatka, Horowe, Horowiszcze, Horowo) among others.

Surnames derived from Croatian ethnonym in Poland are recorded since the 14th century in Kraków, Przemyśl and else, and generally among Polish native nobility, peasants, and local residents, but not among the foreigners. They used it as a nickname, but probably due to the influence of immigration from the Kingdom of Hungary. According to Hanna Popowska-Taborska, although also Grigoriĭ Andreevich Ilʹinskiĭ tried to locate White Croatia using toponyms with the root *běl- (Biała river and Bielsko-Biała), such arguments can be hardly accepted because too many centuries passed between the 7th century migration and first mention of these toponyms and anthroponyms.

== See also ==
- Origin hypotheses of the Croats
- Red Croatia

== Gallery ==
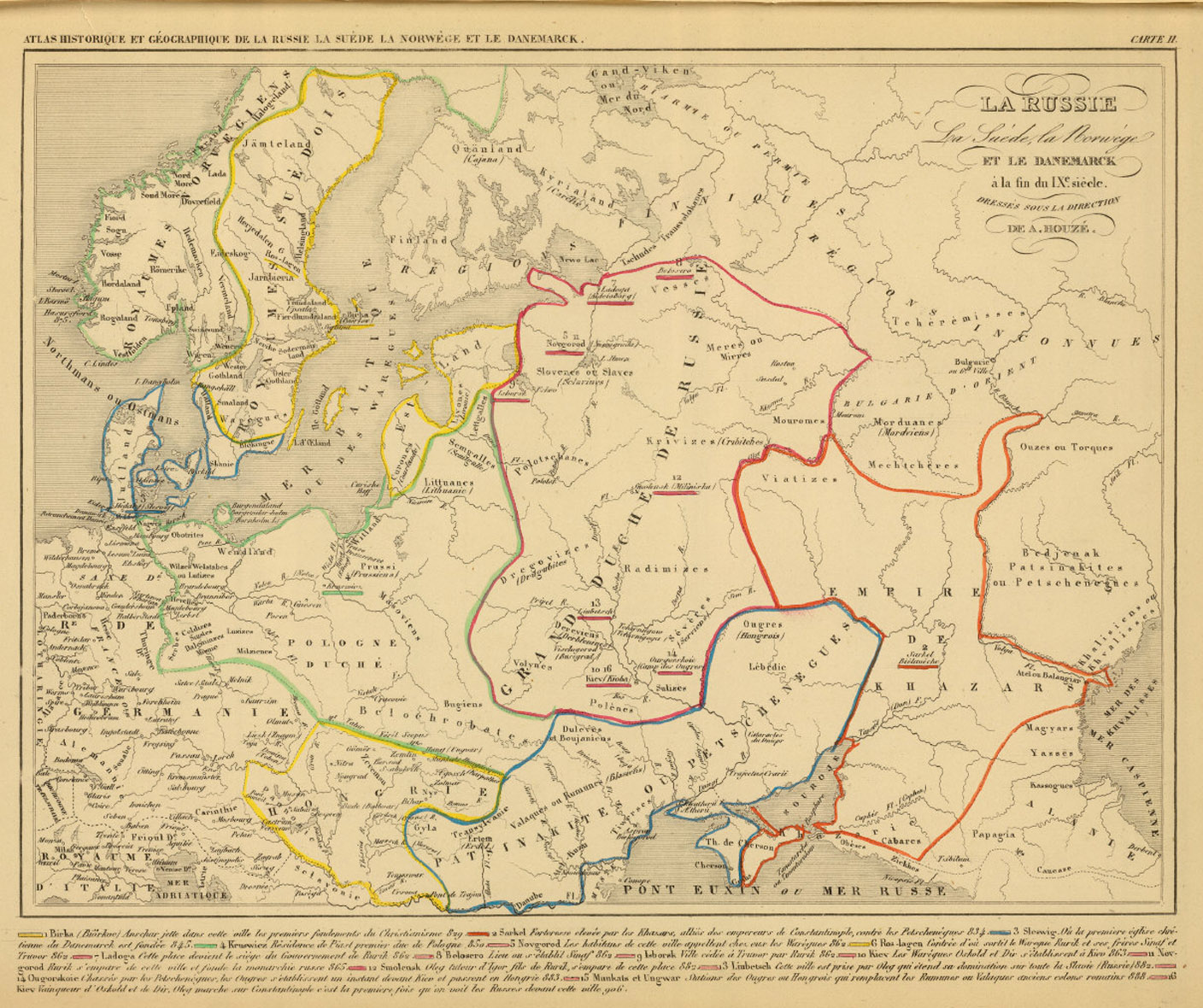
Belochrobates in Lesser Poland and Western Ukraine, by Antoine Philippe Houze (1844)

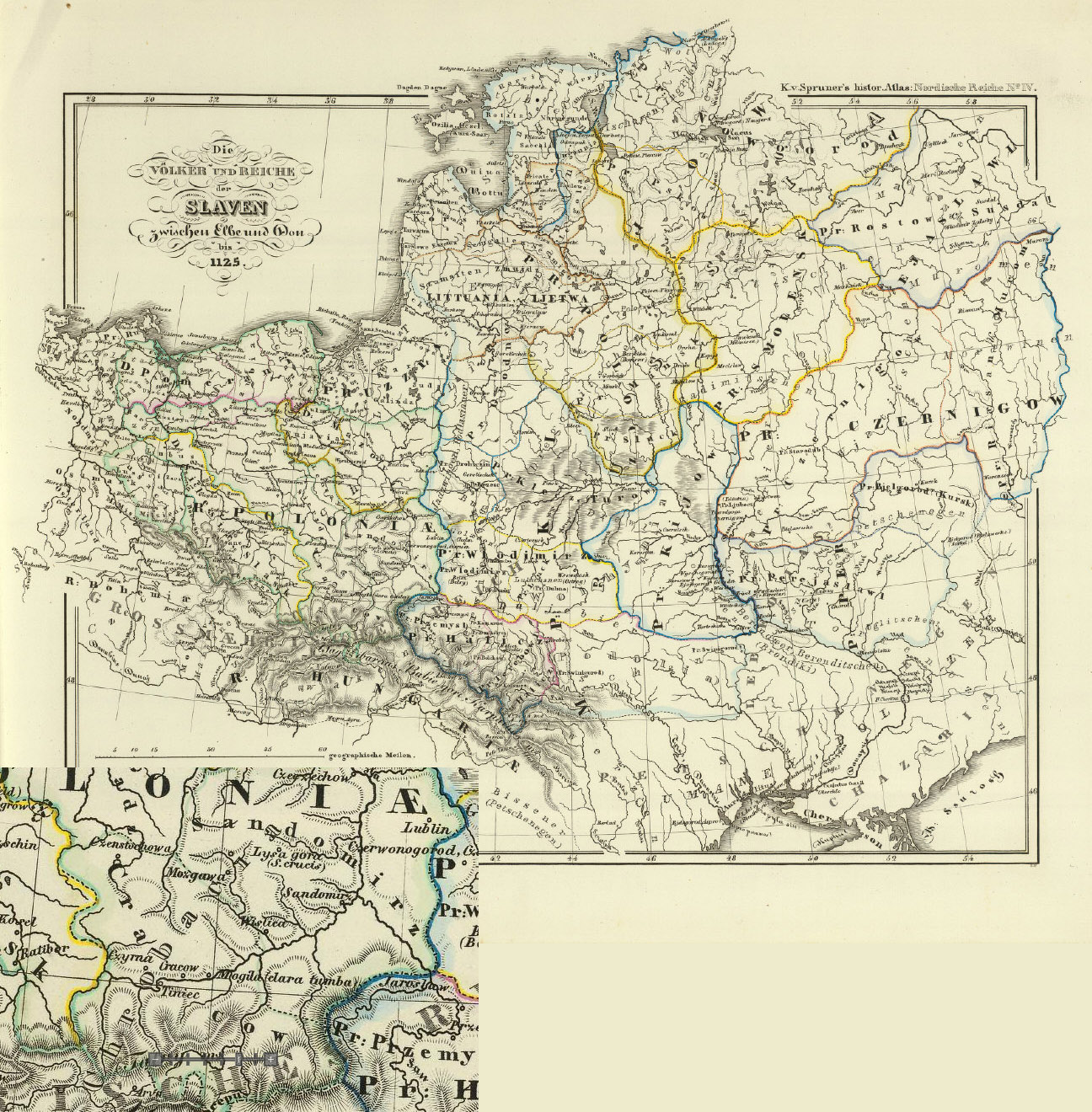
Chrobaci around Kraków, by Karl Spruner von Merz (1855)

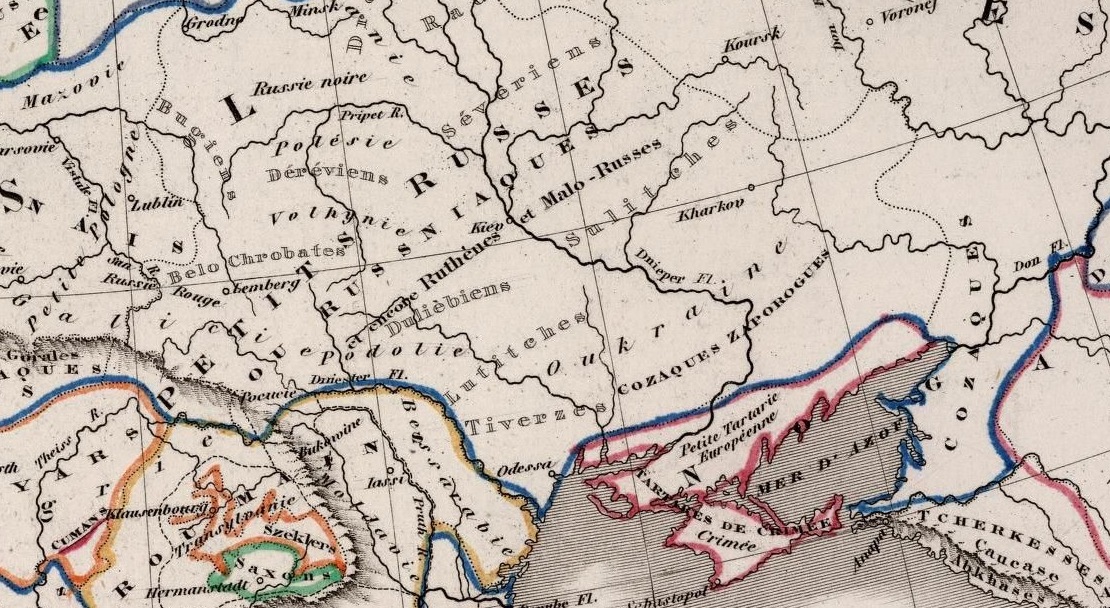
Belo Crhobates in Western Ukraine, by Louis Dussieux (1856)

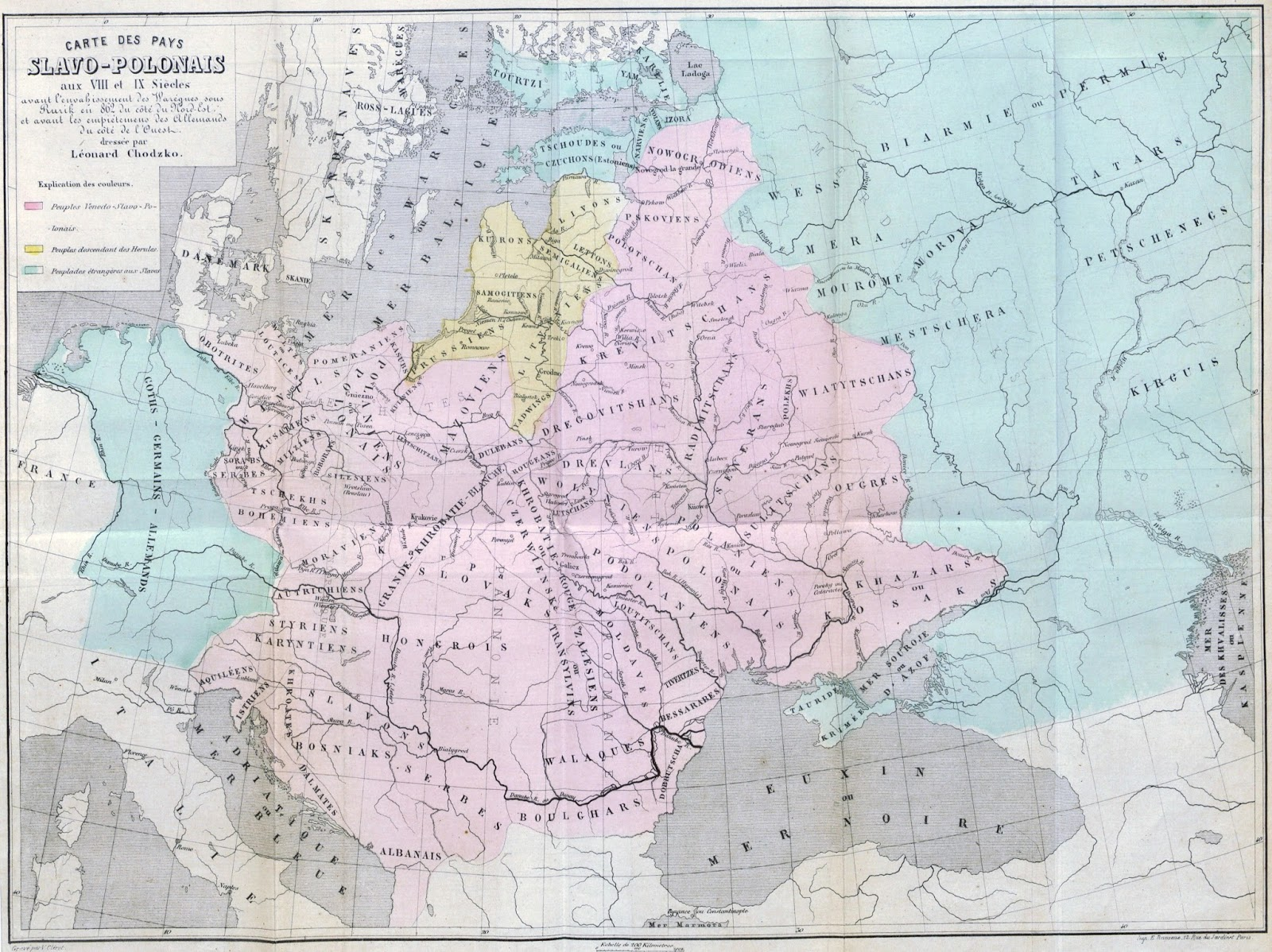
Grande-Khrobatie-Blanche and Khrobatie-Rouge in Lesser Poland, Slovakia and Western Ukraine, by Leonard Chodźko (1861)

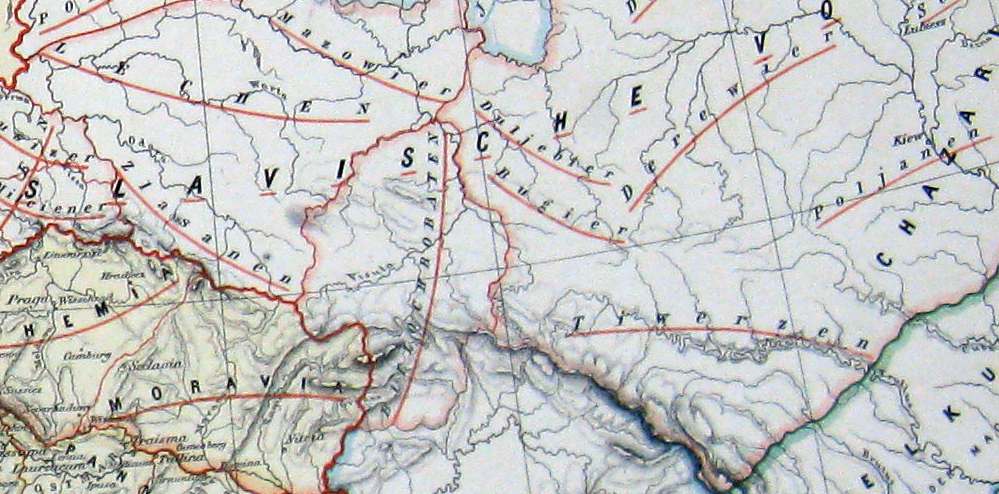
Bielo Chrobaten in Lesser Poland and Slovakia, by Dietrich Reimer (1877)

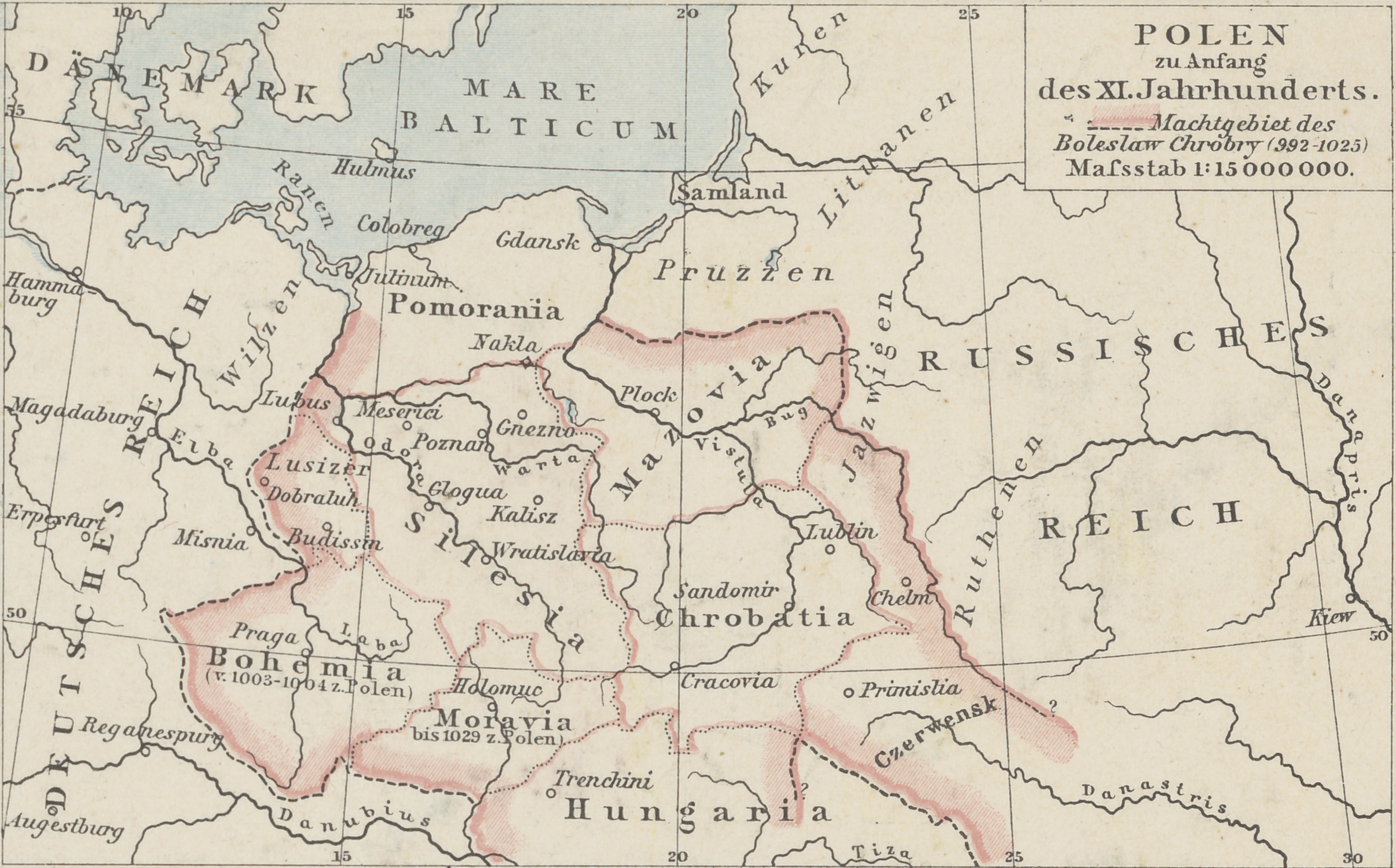
Chrobatia between Kraków and Sandomir, by Johann Gustav Droysen (1886)

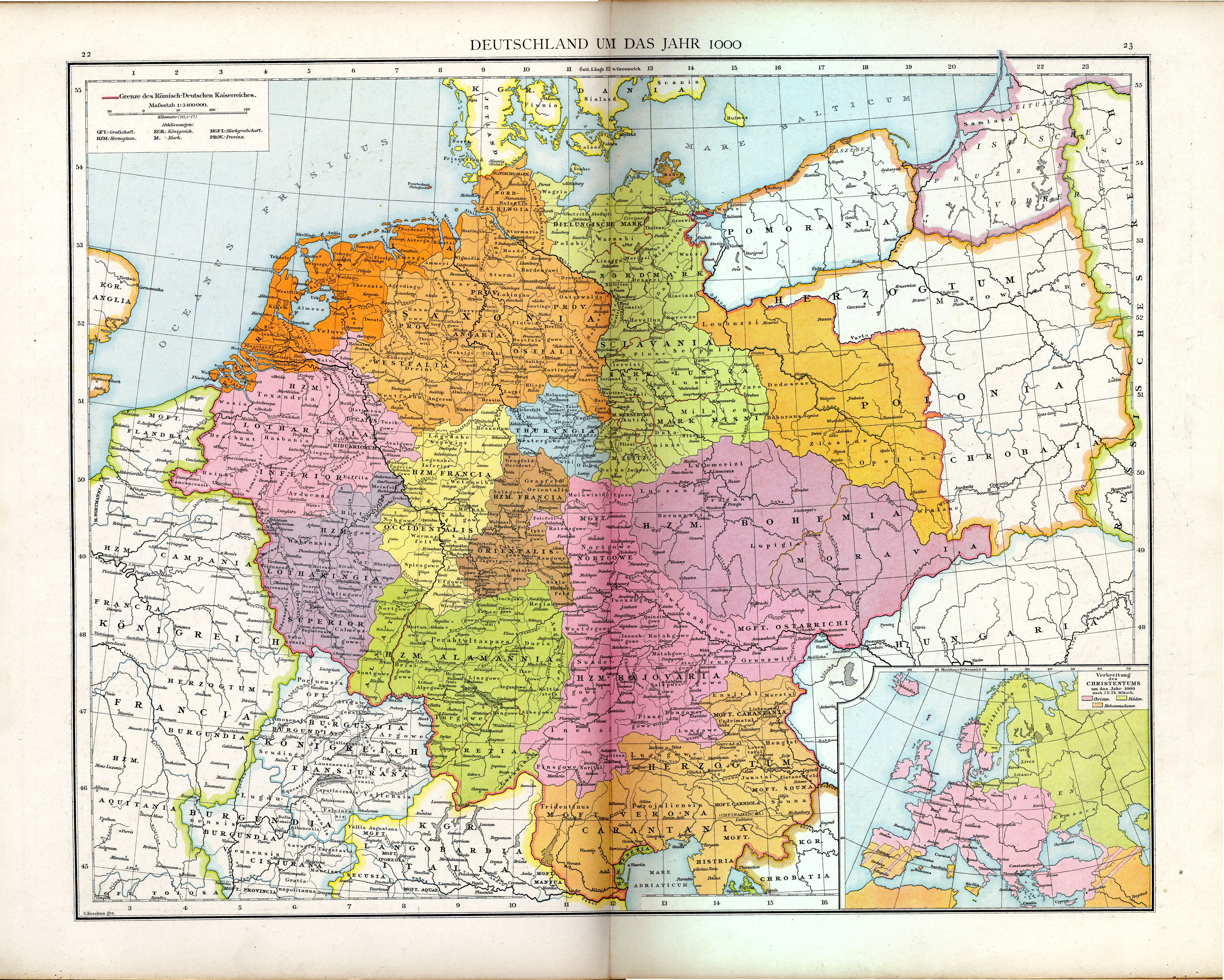
Chrobatia between Kraków and Sandomierz, by Johann Gustav Droysen (1886)

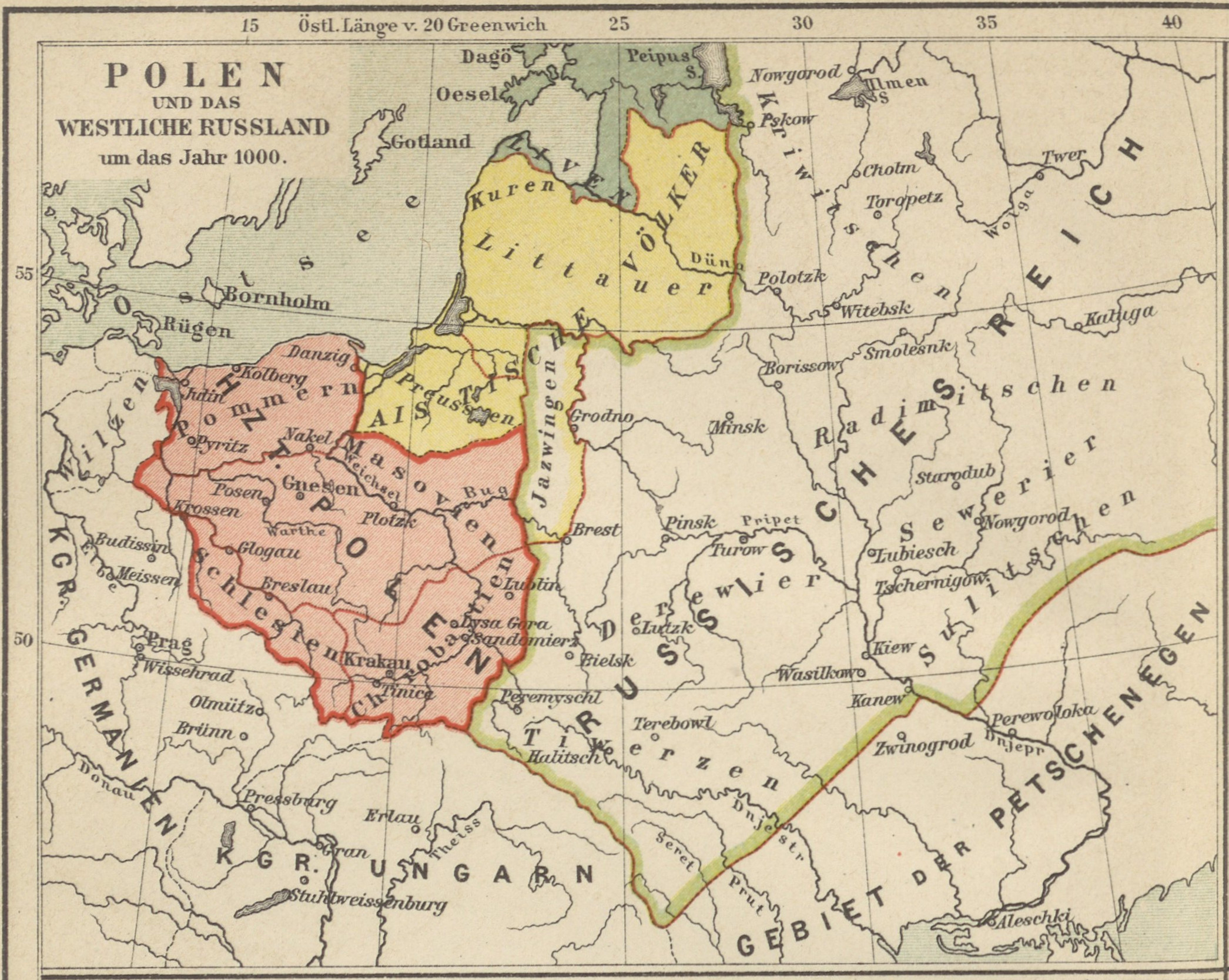
Chrobatien south of Silesia and Mazovia, roughly in Southeast Poland, Meyers Konversations-Lexikon (1890)

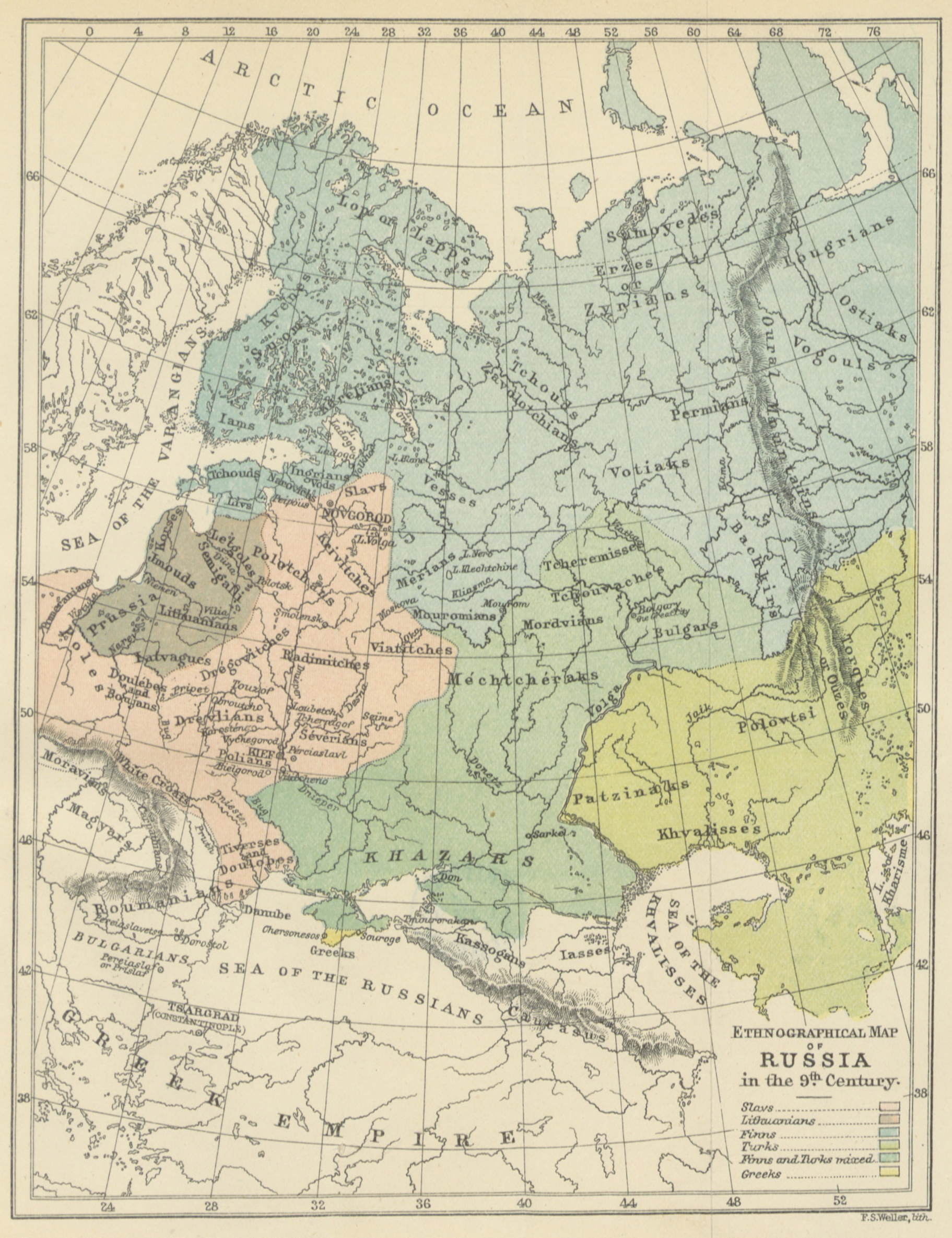
White Croats in Western Ukraine, by Henri Jean Baptiste Anatole Leroy-Beaulieu & Francis Sidney Weller (1893)

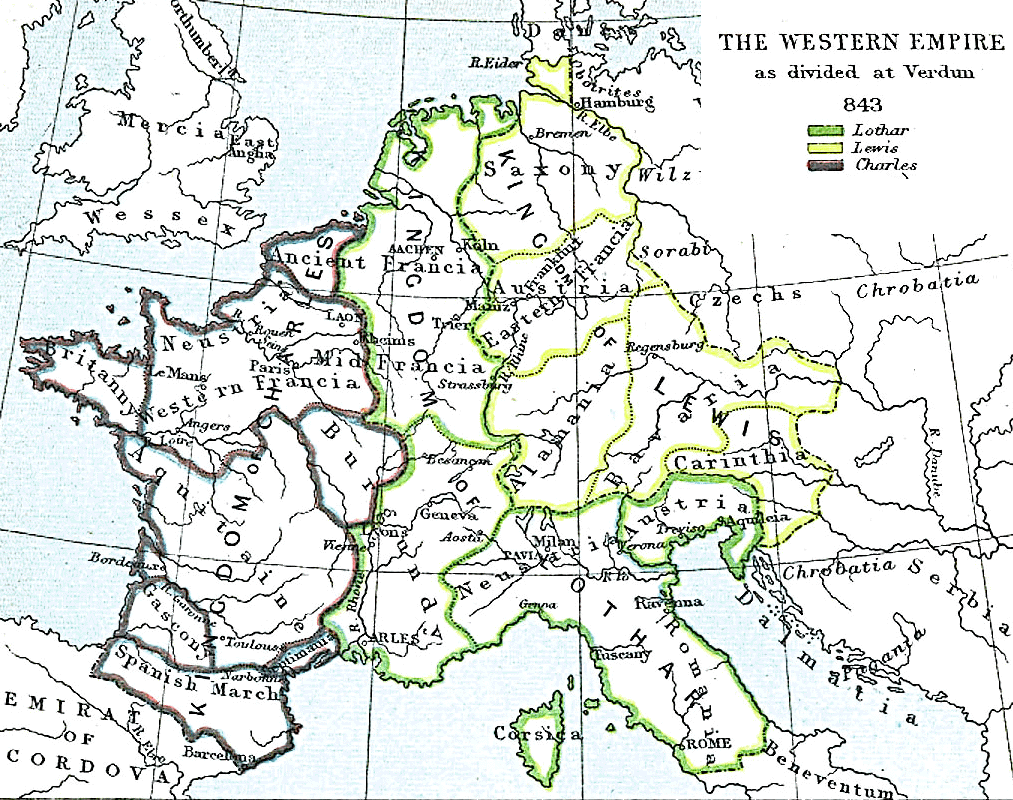
Chrobatia to the East of Czechs, roughly in Lesser Poland, edited by J. B. Bury (1903)

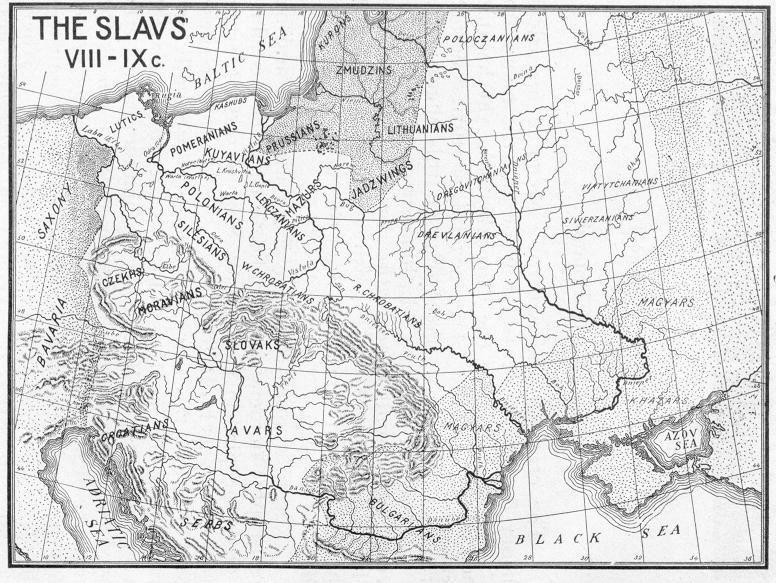
W. Chrobatians and R. Chrobatians in Lesser Poland and Carpathian Ruthenia by Edward Henry Lewinski Corwin (1917)

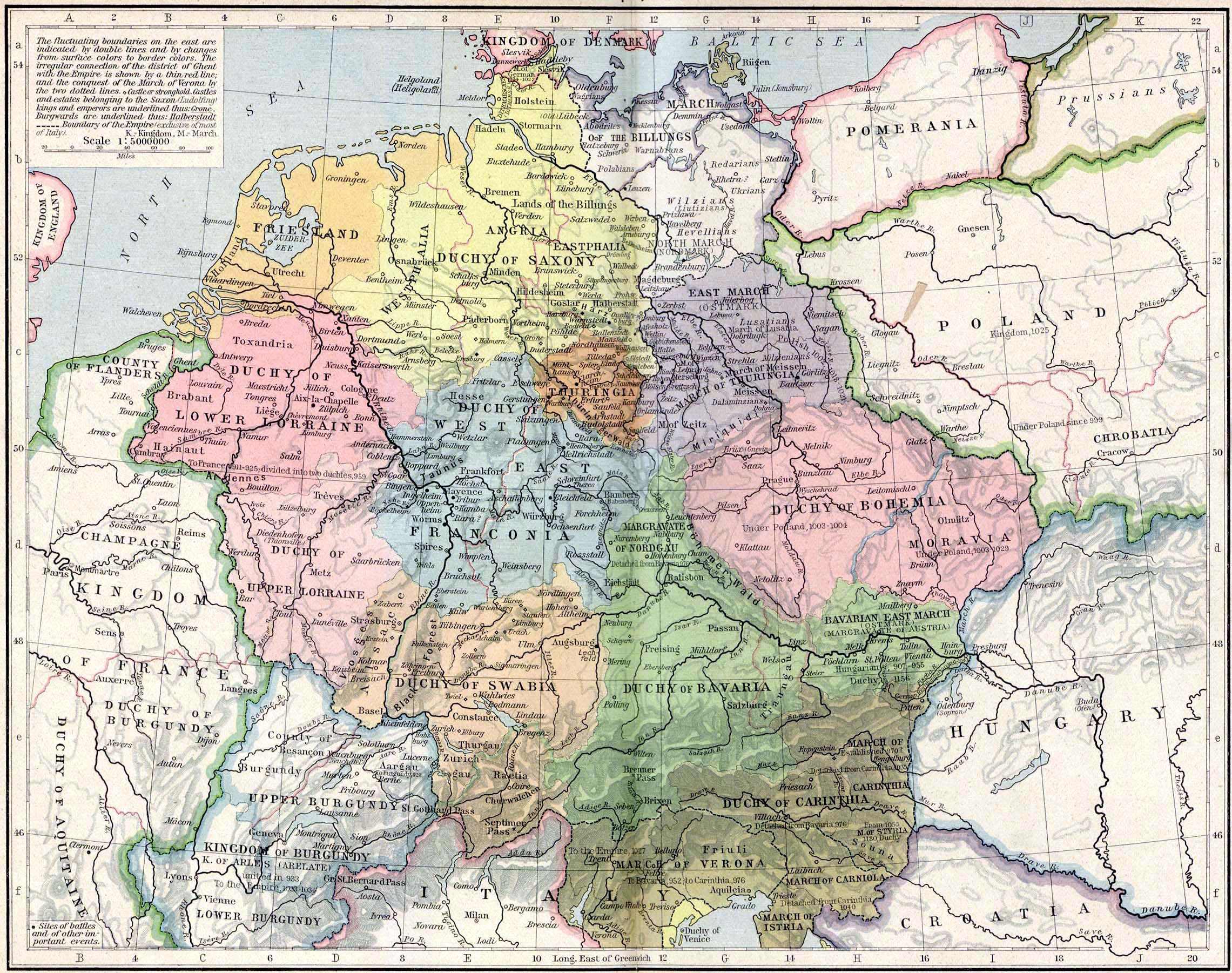
Chrobatia in 919–1125, on Upper Vistula valley and Kraków, by William Robert Shepherd (1934)
