= Goryń, Masovian Voivodeship =

Goryń
- Village
- Location within Poland
- Coordinates: 51°33′N 21°17′E
- Country: Poland
- Voivodeship: Masovian
- County: Radom
- Gmina: Jastrzębia
- Population (2021): 262

Goryń [ˈɡɔrɨɲ] is a village in the administrative district of Gmina Jastrzębia, within Radom County, Masovian Voivodeship, in east-central Poland.
