= Kępiny, Masovian Voivodeship =

Kępiny
- Village
- Location within Poland
- Coordinates: 51°31′52″N 21°4′32″E
- Country: Poland
- Voivodeship: Masovian
- County: Radom
- Gmina: Jedlińsk

Kępiny [kɛmˈpinɨ] is a village in the administrative district of Gmina Jedlińsk, within Radom County, Masovian Voivodeship, in east-central Poland.
