= Grzmucin =

- Village
- Location within Poland
- Coordinates: 51°21′14″N 21°16′57″E
- Country: Poland
- Voivodeship: Masovian
- County: Radom
- Gmina: Gózd

Grzmucin [ˈɡʐmut͡ɕin] is a village in the administrative district of Gmina Gózd, within Radom County, Masovian Voivodeship, in east-central Poland.
