= Piskornica =

- Village
- Location within Poland
- Coordinates: 51°24′N 21°23′E
- Country: Poland
- Voivodeship: Masovian
- County: Radom
- Gmina: Gózd

Piskornica [piskɔrˈnit͡sa] is a village in the administrative district of Gmina Gózd, within Radom County, Masovian Voivodeship, in east-central Poland.
