= Romanów, Gmina Jedlińsk =

Village in Gmina Jedlińsk, Poland

Romanów
- Village
- Location within Poland
- Coordinates: 51°33′47″N 21°6′29″E
- Country: Poland
- Voivodeship: Masovian
- County: Radom
- Gmina: Jedlińsk
- Time zone: UTC+1 (CET)
  - Summer (DST): UTC+2 (CEST)

Romanów [rɔˈmanuf] is a village in the administrative district of Gmina Jedlińsk, within Radom County, Masovian Voivodeship, in east-central Poland.

Five Polish citizens were murdered by Nazi Germany in the village during World War II.
