= Ludwików, Radom County =

Ludwików
- Village
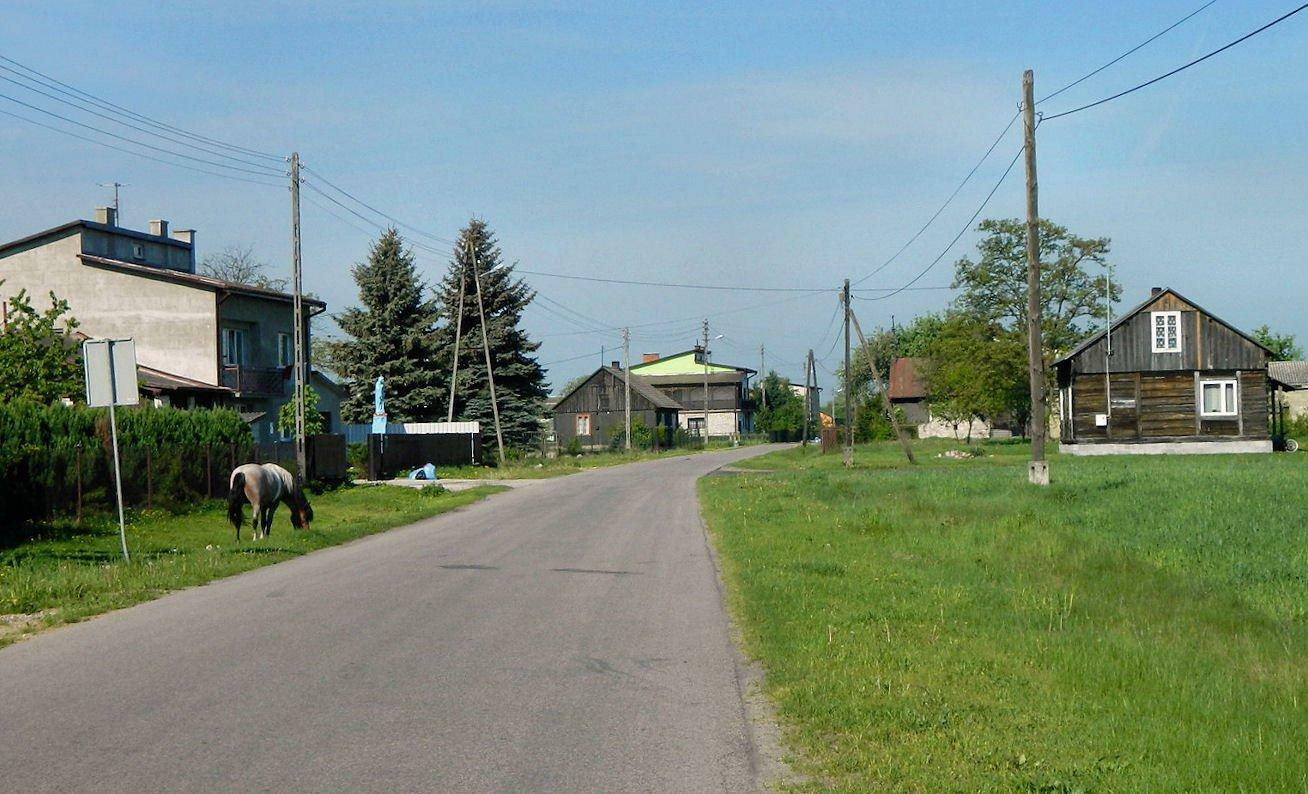
- Street of Ludwików, Radom County

- Location within Poland
- Coordinates: 51°30′54″N 21°2′36″E
- Country: Poland
- Voivodeship: Masovian
- County: Radom
- Gmina: Jedlińsk

Ludwików [ludˈvikuf] is a village in the administrative district of Gmina Jedlińsk, within Radom County, Masovian Voivodeship, in east-central Poland.
