= Narty, Radom County =

Narty
- Village
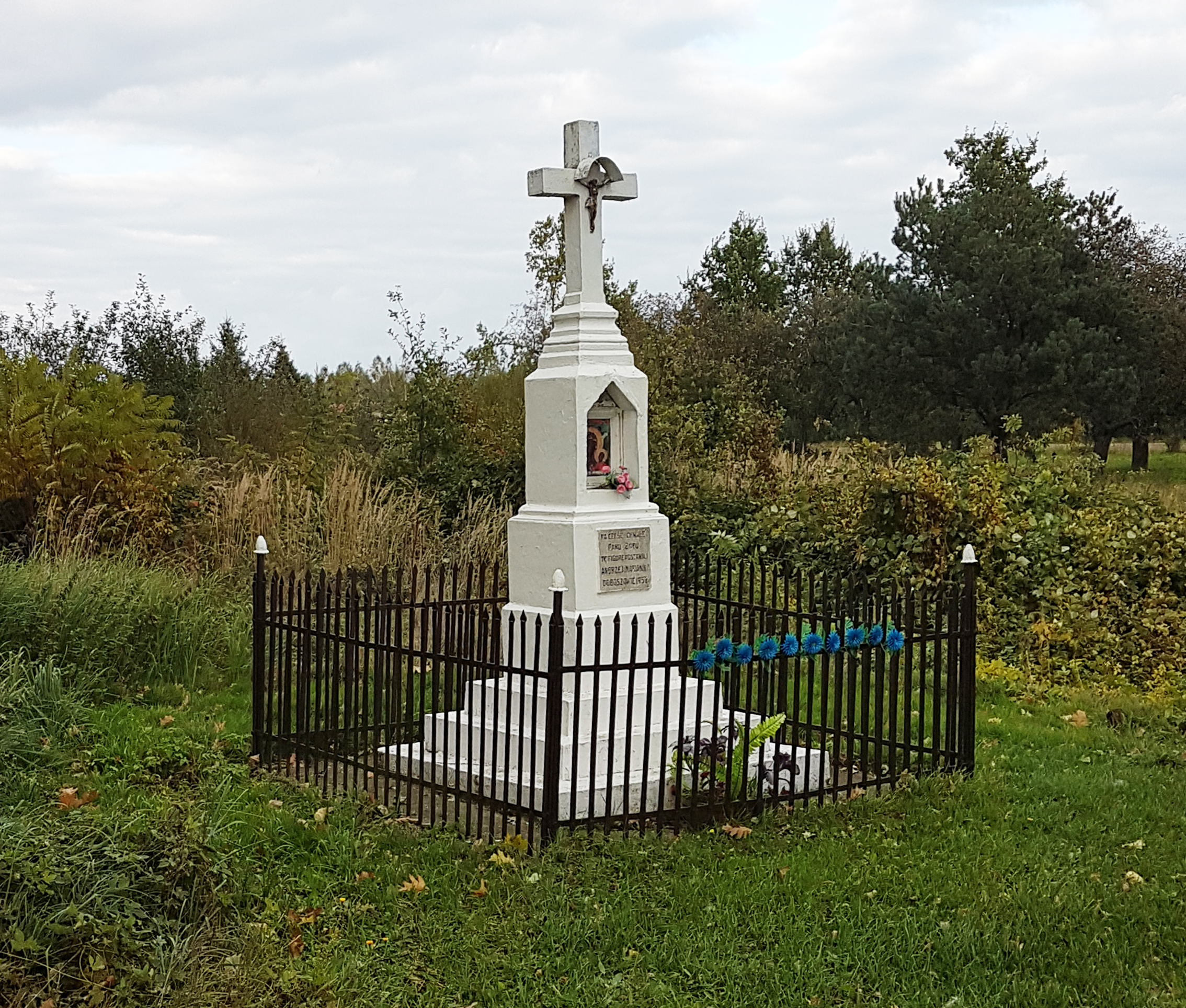
- Wayside shrine in Narty

- Location within Poland
- Coordinates: 51°31′15″N 21°4′28″E
- Country: Poland
- Voivodeship: Masovian
- County: Radom
- Gmina: Jedlińsk

Narty [ˈnartɨ] is a village in the administrative district of Gmina Jedlińsk, within Radom County, Masovian Voivodeship, in east-central Poland.
