= Klonów =

Klonów may refer to the following places in Poland:

- Klonów, Lower Silesian Voivodeship (south-west Poland)
- Klonów, Łódź Voivodeship (central Poland)
- Klonów, Lesser Poland Voivodeship (south Poland)
- Klonów, Świętokrzyskie Voivodeship (south-central Poland)
- Kłonów, Masovian Voivodeship (east-central Poland)
