= Czarna Rola =

- Village
- Location within Poland
- Coordinates: 51°32′55″N 21°5′14″E
- Country: Poland
- Voivodeship: Masovian
- County: Radom
- Gmina: Jedlińsk

Czarna Rola [ˈt͡ʂarna ˈrɔla] is a village in the administrative district of Gmina Jedlińsk, within Radom County, Masovian Voivodeship, in east-central Poland.
