= Jastrzębska =

Jastrzębska is a Polish surname. Notable people with the surname include:

- Maria Jastrzębska, Polish poet
- Maria Wanda Jastrzębska, Polish electronics engineer
- Mirosława Jastrzębska, Polish scientist
- Zofia Jastrzębska, Polish actress

== See also ==
- Dąbrowa Jastrzębska, Polish village
- Jastrzębska Wola, Polish village
- Jastrzębska Spółka Węglowa, Polish coal mining company
