= Czarny Ług =

- Village
- Location within Poland
- Coordinates: 51°35′N 21°12′E
- Country: Poland
- Voivodeship: Masovian
- County: Radom
- Gmina: Jedlińsk

Czarny Ług [ˈt͡ʂarnɨ ˈwuk] is a village in the administrative district of Gmina Jedlińsk, within Radom County, Masovian Voivodeship, in east-central Poland.
