= Jankowice, Radom County =

Jankowice
- Village
- Location within Poland
- Coordinates: 51°30′N 21°1′E
- Country: Poland
- Voivodeship: Masovian
- County: Radom
- Gmina: Jedlińsk

Jankowice [jankɔˈvit͡sɛ] is a village in the administrative district of Gmina Jedlińsk, within Radom County, Masovian Voivodeship, in east-central Poland.
