= Kruszyna, Radom County =

Kruszyna
- Village
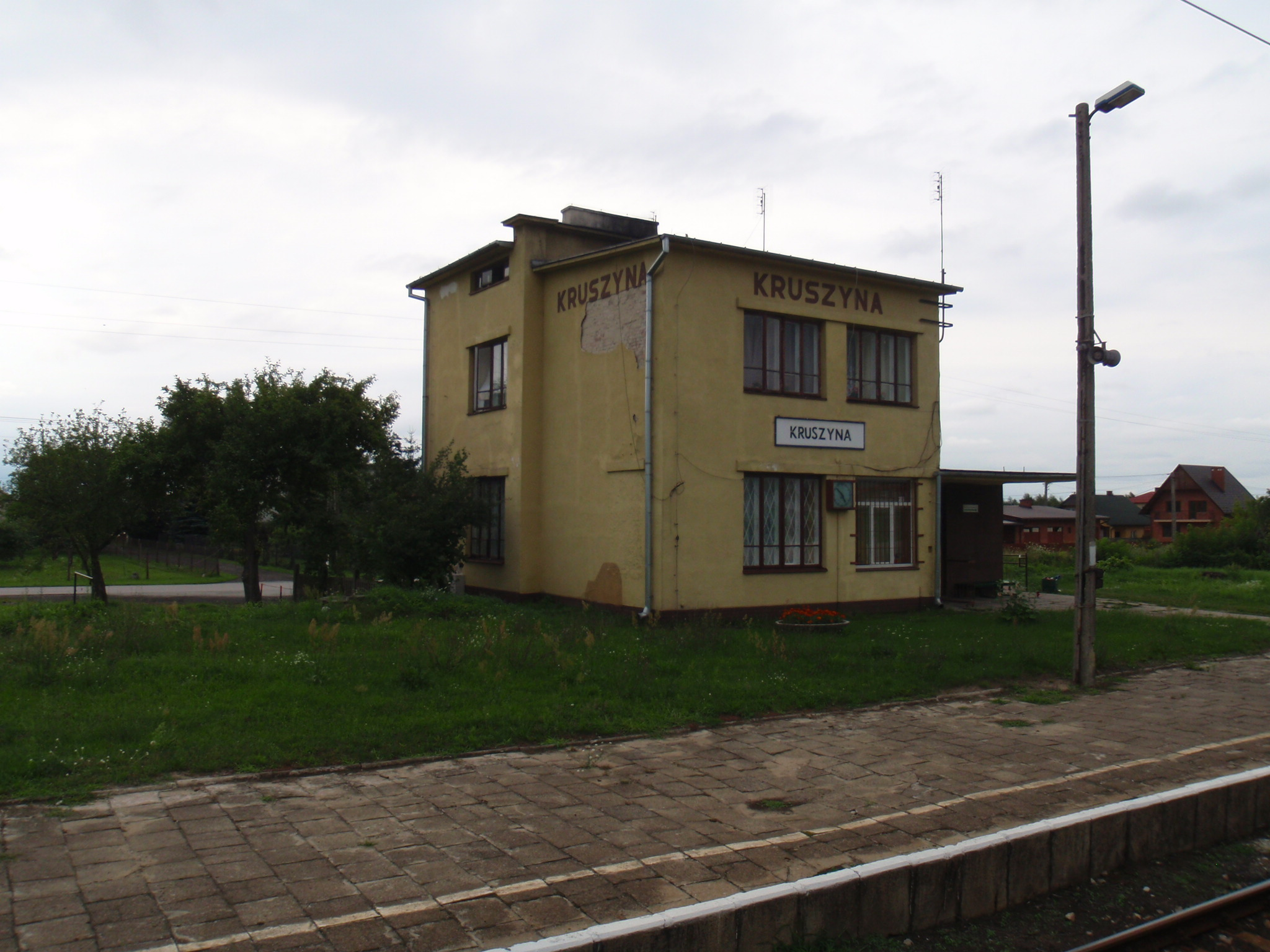
- Train stop in Kruszyna

- Location within Poland
- Coordinates: 51°34′45″N 21°10′29″E
- Country: Poland
- Voivodeship: Masovian
- County: Radom
- Gmina: Jedlińsk
- Time zone: UTC+1 (CET)
  - Summer (DST): UTC+2 (CEST)

Kruszyna [kruˈʂɨna] is a village in the administrative district of Gmina Jedlińsk within Radom County, Masovian Voivodeship, in east-central Poland.

Six Polish citizens were murdered by Nazi Germany in the village during World War II.
