= Wojciechów, Masovian Voivodeship =

Wojciechów
- Village
- Location within Poland
- Coordinates: 51°29′18″N 21°12′45″E
- Country: Poland
- Voivodeship: Masovian
- County: Radom
- Gmina: Jastrzębia
- Population (2021): 308

Wojciechów (Polish pronunciation: [vɔjˈt͡ɕɛxuf]) is a village in the administrative district of Gmina Jastrzębia, within Radom County, Masovian Voivodeship, in east-central Poland.
