= Podgóra, Radom County =

Podgóra
- Village
- Location within Poland
- Coordinates: 51°22′34″N 21°26′31″E
- Country: Poland
- Voivodeship: Masovian
- County: Radom
- Gmina: Gózd

Podgóra [pɔdˈɡura] is a village in the administrative district of Gmina Gózd, within Radom County, Masovian Voivodeship, in east-central Poland.
