= Józefów, Radom County =

Józefów
- Village
- Location within Poland
- Coordinates: 51°32′24″N 21°7′27″E
- Country: Poland
- Voivodeship: Masovian
- County: Radom
- Gmina: Jedlińsk

Józefów (Polish pronunciation: [juˈzɛfuf]) is a village in the administrative district of Gmina Jedlińsk, within Radom County, Masovian Voivodeship, in east-central Poland.
