= Lipiny, Radom County =

Lipiny
- Village
- Location within Poland
- Coordinates: 51°23′13″N 21°23′41″E
- Country: Poland
- Voivodeship: Masovian
- County: Radom
- Gmina: Gózd

Lipiny [liˈpinɨ] is a village in the administrative district of Gmina Gózd, within Radom County, Masovian Voivodeship, in east-central Poland.
