= Marcelów, Gmina Jedlińsk =

Marcelów
- Village
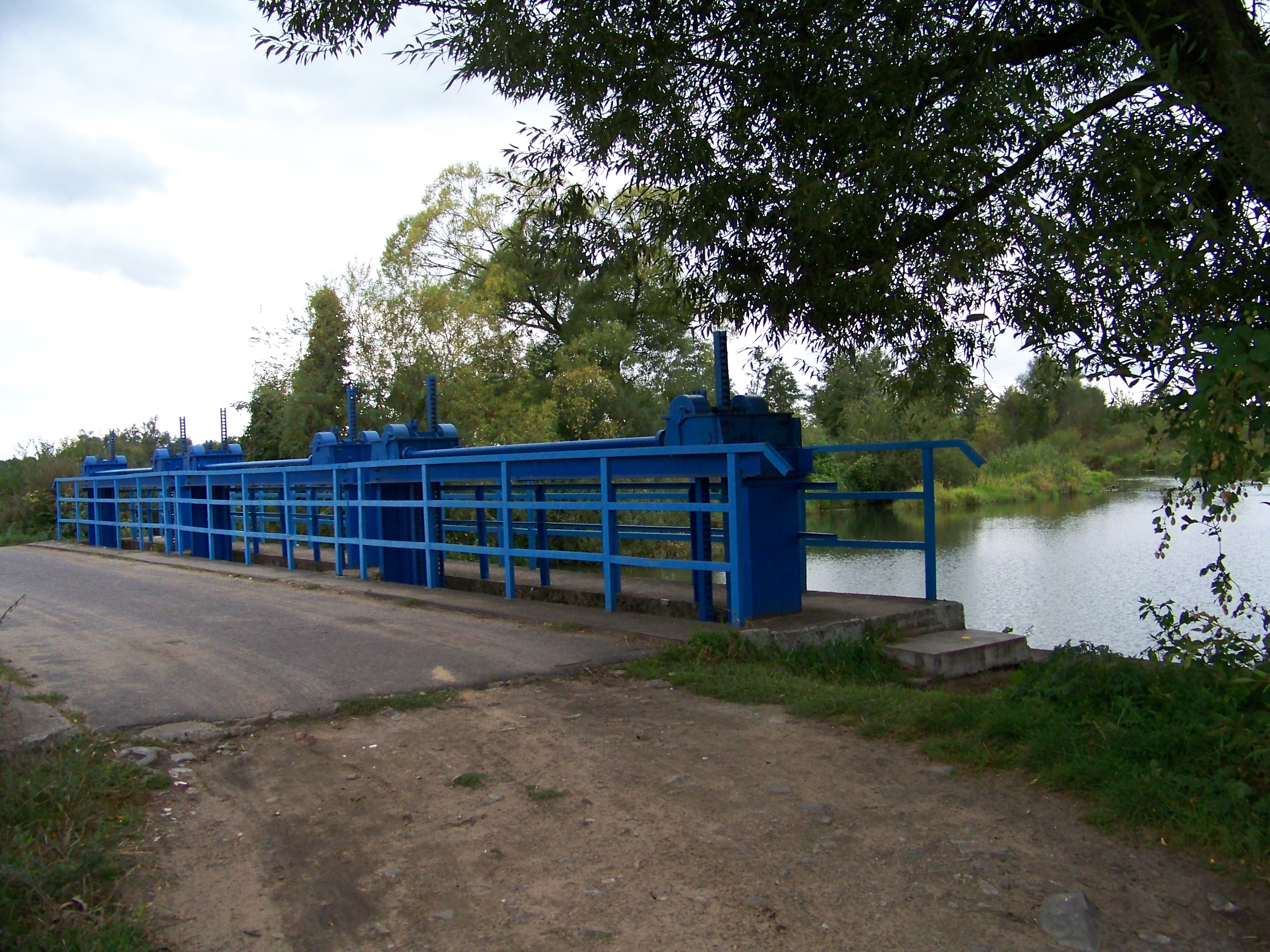
- Lock in Marcelów at Radomka

- Location within Poland
- Coordinates: 51°30′09″N 21°09′19″E
- Country: Poland
- Voivodeship: Masovian
- County: Radom
- Gmina: Jedlińsk

Marcelów [marˈt͡sɛluf] is a village in the administrative district of Gmina Jedlińsk, within Radom County, Masovian Voivodeship, in east-central Poland.
