= Dąbrowa Kozłowska =

- Village
- Location within Poland
- Coordinates: 51°27′30″N 21°15′56″E
- Country: Poland
- Voivodeship: Masovian
- County: Radom
- Gmina: Jastrzębia
- Population (2021): 341

Dąbrowa Kozłowska [dɔmˈbrɔva kɔˈzwɔfska] is a village in the administrative district of Gmina Jastrzębia, within Radom County, Masovian Voivodeship, in east-central Poland.
