= Józefówek, Masovian Voivodeship =

Józefówek
- Village
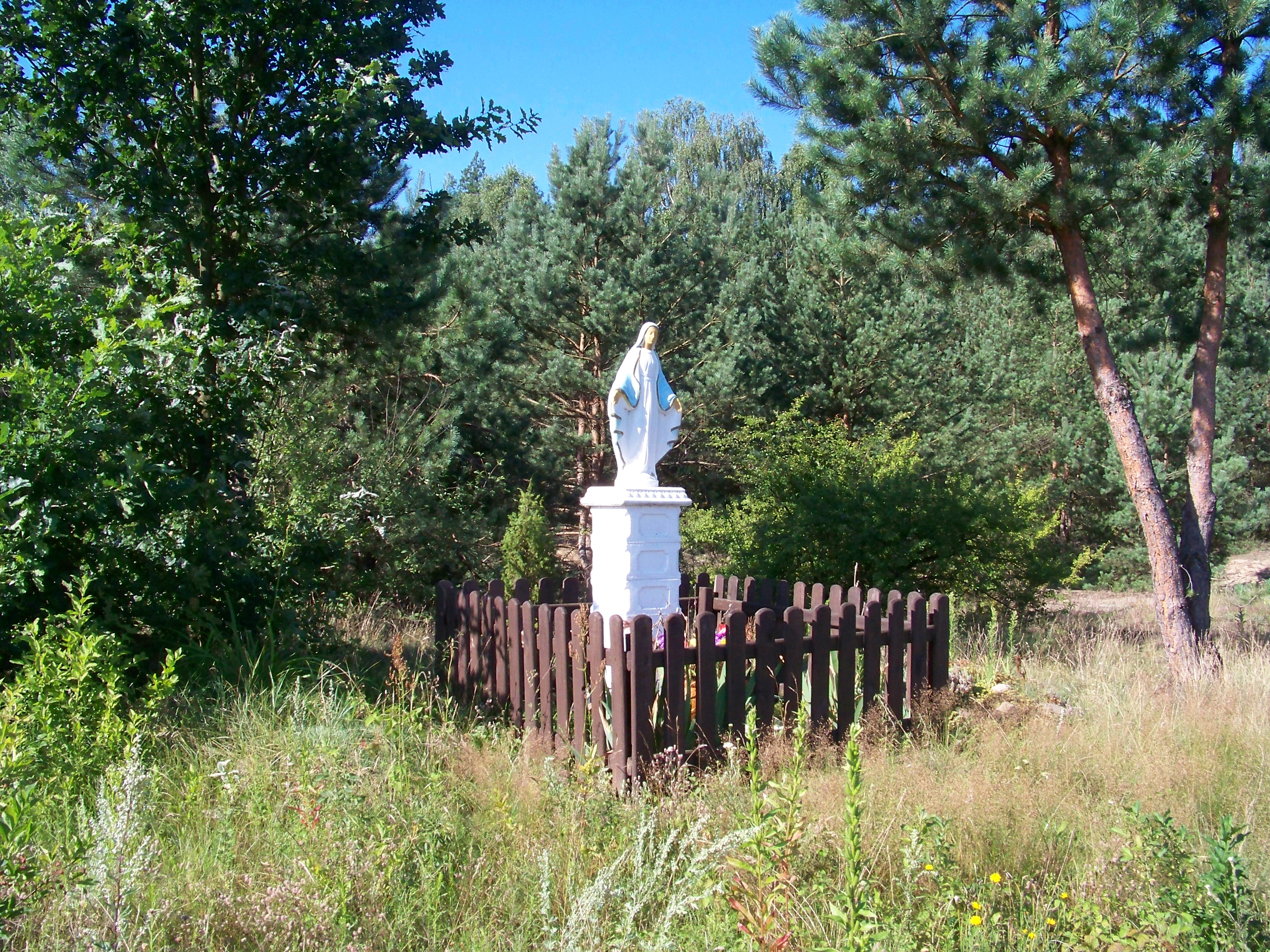
- Chapel in Józefówek, Masovian Voivodeship

- Location within Poland
- Coordinates: 51°29′21″N 21°10′29″E
- Country: Poland
- Voivodeship: Masovian
- County: Radom
- Gmina: Jedlińsk

Józefówek (Polish pronunciation: [juzɛˈfuvɛk]) is a village in the administrative district of Gmina Jedlińsk, within Radom County, Masovian Voivodeship, in east-central Poland.
