= Stare Zawady =

- Village
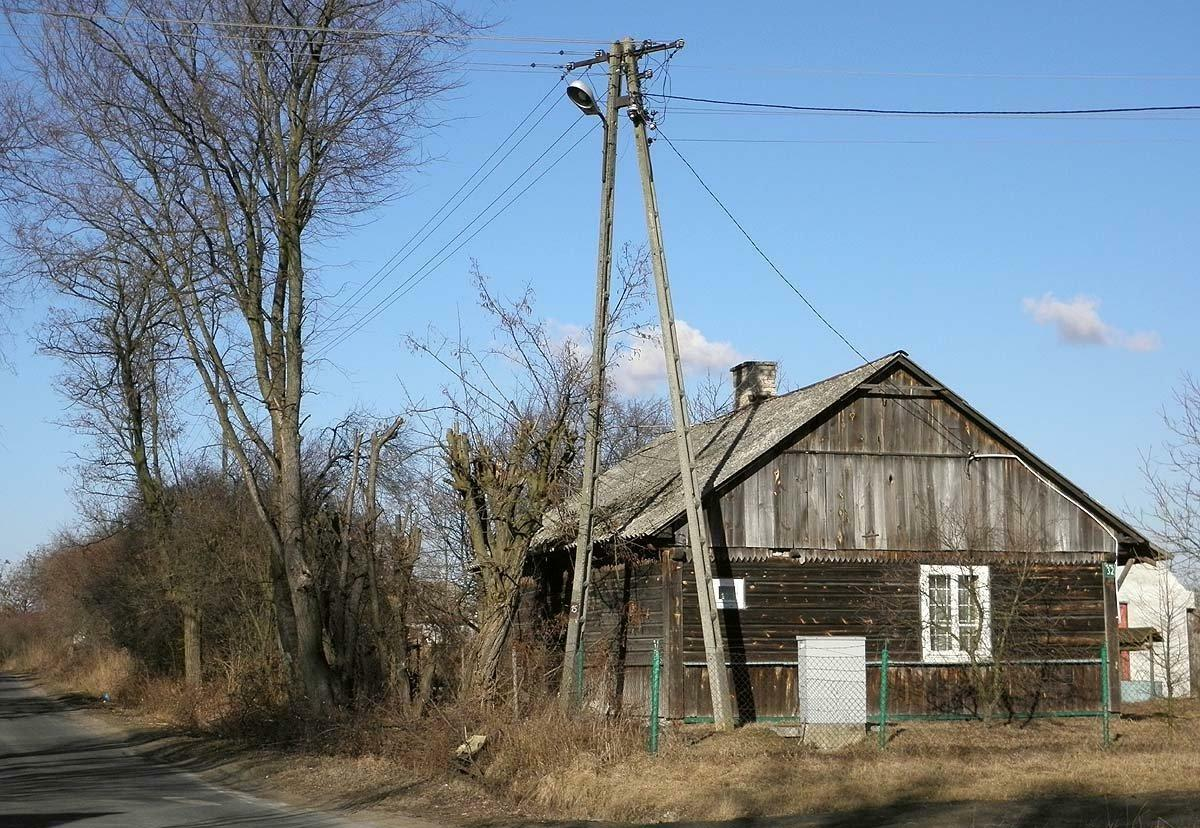

- Location within Poland
- Coordinates: 51°32′44″N 21°7′46″E
- Country: Poland
- Voivodeship: Masovian
- County: Radom
- Gmina: Jedlińsk

Stare Zawady [ˈstarɛ zaˈvadɨ] is a village in the administrative district of Gmina Jedlińsk, within Radom County, Masovian Voivodeship, in east-central Poland.
