= Janki, Radom County =

Janki
- Village
- Location within Poland
- Coordinates: 51°32′25″N 21°8′21″E
- Country: Poland
- Voivodeship: Masovian
- County: Radom
- Gmina: Jedlińsk

Janki [ˈjanki] is a village in the administrative district of Gmina Jedlińsk, within Radom County, Masovian Voivodeship, in east-central Poland.
