= Owadów =

Owadów may refer to the following places in Poland:

- Owadów, Łódź Voivodeship (central Poland)
- Owadów, Masovian Voivodeship (east-central Poland)
