= Obózek =

- Village
- Location within Poland
- Coordinates: 51°33′22″N 21°09′26″E
- Country: Poland
- Voivodeship: Masovian
- County: Radom
- Gmina: Jedlińsk

Obózek [ɔˈbuzɛk] is a village in the administrative district of Gmina Jedlińsk, within Radom County, Masovian Voivodeship, in east-central Poland.
