= Nowe Zawady =

- Village
- Location within Poland
- Coordinates: 51°33′38″N 21°7′56″E
- Country: Poland
- Voivodeship: Masovian
- County: Radom
- Gmina: Jedlińsk

Nowe Zawady [ˈnɔvɛ zaˈvadɨ] is a village in the administrative district of Gmina Jedlińsk, within Radom County, Masovian Voivodeship, in east-central Poland. The estimated population of the village is 408 according to a census in 2021.
