= Kuczki-Wieś =

- Village
- Location within Poland
- Coordinates: 51°21′57″N 21°20′34″E
- Country: Poland
- Voivodeship: Masovian
- County: Radom
- Gmina: Gózd

Kuczki-Wieś [ˈkut͡ʂki ˈvjɛɕ] is a village in the administrative district of Gmina Gózd, within Radom County, Masovian Voivodeship, in east-central Poland.
