= Niemianowice =

- Village
- Location within Poland
- Coordinates: 51°23′1″N 21°19′54″E
- Country: Poland
- Voivodeship: Masovian
- County: Radom
- Gmina: Gózd

Niemianowice [ɲɛmjanɔˈvit͡sɛ] is a village in the administrative district of Gmina Gózd, within Radom County, Masovian Voivodeship, in east-central Poland.
