= Wola Gutowska =

- Village
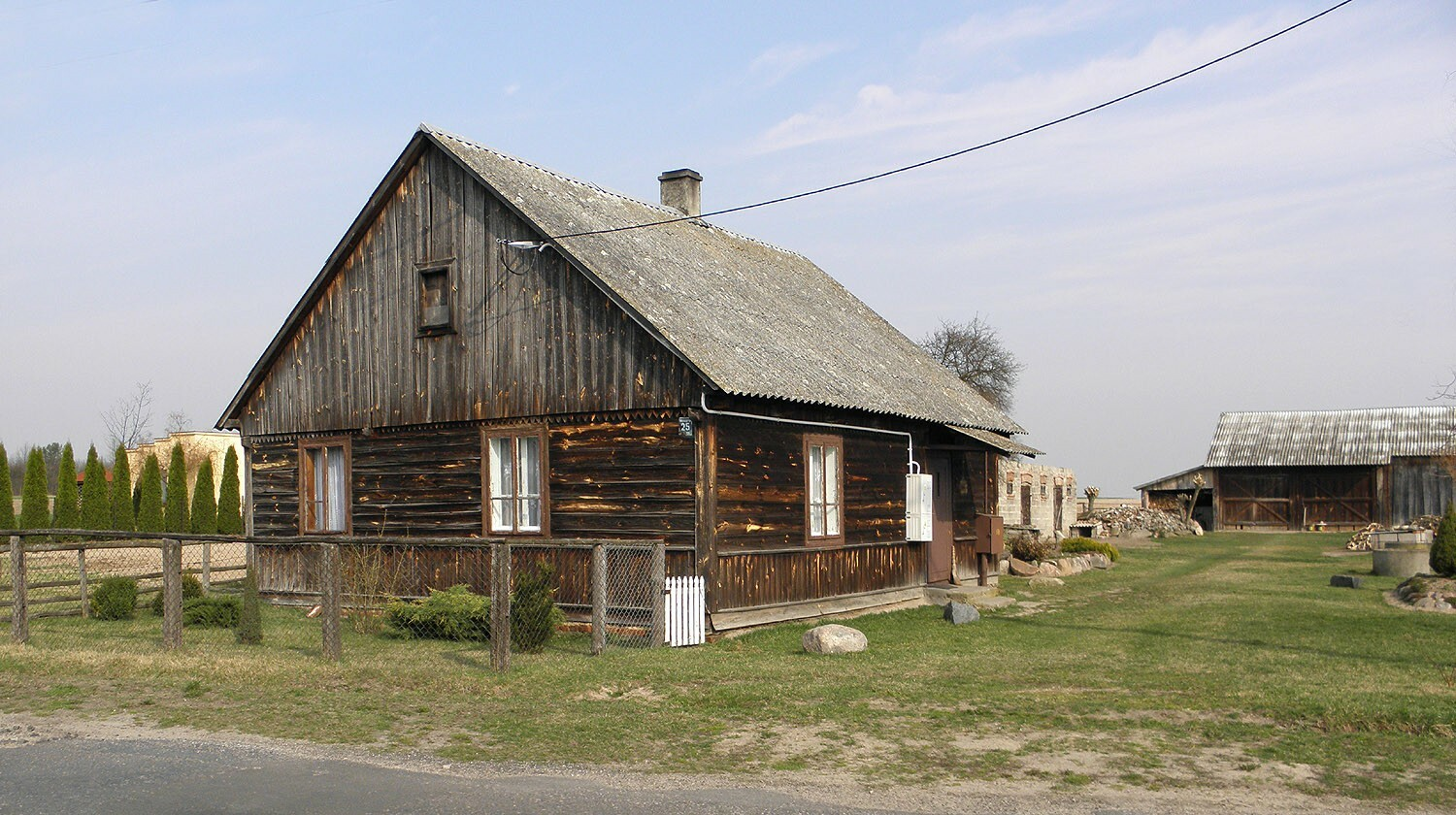
- Traditional old wooden house

- Location within Poland
- Coordinates: 51°31′N 21°6′E
- Country: Poland
- Voivodeship: Masovian
- County: Radom
- Gmina: Jedlińsk

Population (approx.)
  - Total: 270

Wola Gutowska [ˈvɔla ɡuˈtɔfska] is a village in the administrative district of Gmina Jedlińsk, within Radom County, Masovian Voivodeship, in east-central Poland.
