= Piaski, Gmina Jedlińsk =

Piaski
- Village
- Location within Poland
- Coordinates: 51°31′N 21°6′E
- Country: Poland
- Voivodeship: Masovian
- County: Radom
- Gmina: Jedlińsk
- Population (approx.): 510

Piaski (Polish pronunciation: [ˈpjaskʲi]) is a village in the administrative district of Gmina Jedlińsk, within Radom County, Masovian Voivodeship, in east-central Poland.
