= Urbanów =

- Village
- Location within Poland
- Coordinates: 51°34′22″N 21°7′20″E
- Country: Poland
- Voivodeship: Masovian
- County: Radom
- Gmina: Jedlińsk

Urbanów [urˈbanuf] is a village in the administrative district of Gmina Jedlińsk, within Radom County, Masovian Voivodeship, in east-central Poland.
