= Wojsławice, Masovian Voivodeship =

Wojsławice
- Village
- Location within Poland
- Coordinates: 51°21′39″N 21°19′13″E
- Country: Poland
- Voivodeship: Masovian
- County: Radom
- Gmina: Gózd
- Population: 290

Wojsławice [vɔi̯swaˈvit͡sɛ] is a village in the administrative district of Gmina Gózd, within Radom County, Masovian Voivodeship, in east-central Poland.
