= Budki Wierzchowskie =

- Village
- Location within Poland
- Coordinates: 51°33′N 21°11′E
- Country: Poland
- Voivodeship: Masovian
- County: Radom
- Gmina: Jedlińsk
- Population: 50

Budki Wierzchowskie [ˈbutki vjɛʂˈxɔfskʲɛ] is a village in the administrative district of Gmina Jedlińsk, within Radom County, Masovian Voivodeship, in east-central Poland.
