= Boża Wola, Radom County =

Boża Wola
- Village
- Location within Poland
- Coordinates: 51°34′54″N 21°13′46″E
- Country: Poland
- Voivodeship: Masovian
- County: Radom
- Gmina: Jedlińsk

Boża Wola [ˈbɔʐa ˈvɔla] is a village in the administrative district of Gmina Jedlińsk, within Radom County, Masovian Voivodeship, in east-central Poland.
