= Małęczyn =

- Village
- Location within Poland
- Coordinates: 51°22′41″N 21°15′10″E
- Country: Poland
- Voivodeship: Masovian
- County: Radom
- Gmina: Gózd
- Population: 940

Małęczyn [maˈwɛnt͡ʂɨn] is a village in the administrative district of Gmina Gózd, within Radom County, Masovian Voivodeship, in east-central Poland.
