= Wólka Lesiowska =

- Village
- Location within Poland
- Coordinates: 51°29′N 21°16′E
- Country: Poland
- Voivodeship: Masovian
- County: Radom
- Gmina: Jastrzębia
- Population (2021): 293

Wólka Lesiowska [ˈvulka lɛˈɕɔfska] is a village in the administrative district of Gmina Jastrzębia, within Radom County, Masovian Voivodeship, in east-central Poland.
