= Wielogóra, Masovian Voivodeship =

Wielogóra
- Village
- Location within Poland
- Coordinates: 51°28′N 21°8′E
- Country: Poland
- Voivodeship: Masovian
- County: Radom
- Gmina: Jedlińsk
- Population (approx.): 1,100

Wielogóra [vjɛlɔˈɡura] is a village in the administrative district of Gmina Jedlińsk, within Radom County, Masovian Voivodeship, in east-central Poland.
