= Wsola =

- Village
- Location within Poland
- Coordinates: 51°29′N 21°7′E
- Country: Poland
- Voivodeship: Masovian
- County: Radom
- Gmina: Jedlińsk
- Population (approx.): 1,500

Wsola [ˈfsɔla] is a village in the administrative district of Gmina Jedlińsk, within Radom County, Masovian Voivodeship, in east-central Poland.
