= Górna Wola, Masovian Voivodeship =

Górna Wola
- Village
- Location within Poland
- Coordinates: 51°31′N 21°1′E
- Country: Poland
- Voivodeship: Masovian
- County: Radom
- Gmina: Jedlińsk

Górna Wola [ˈɡurna ˈvɔla] is a village in the administrative district of Gmina Jedlińsk, within Radom County, Masovian Voivodeship, in east-central Poland.
