= Nowa Wola, Radom County =

Nowa Wola
- Village
- Location within Poland
- Coordinates: 51°33′34″N 21°4′52″E
- Country: Poland
- Voivodeship: Masovian
- County: Radom
- Gmina: Jedlińsk

Nowa Wola [ˈnɔva ˈvɔla] is a village in the administrative district of Gmina Jedlińsk, within Radom County, Masovian Voivodeship, in east-central Poland.
