= Jedlińsk =

- Village
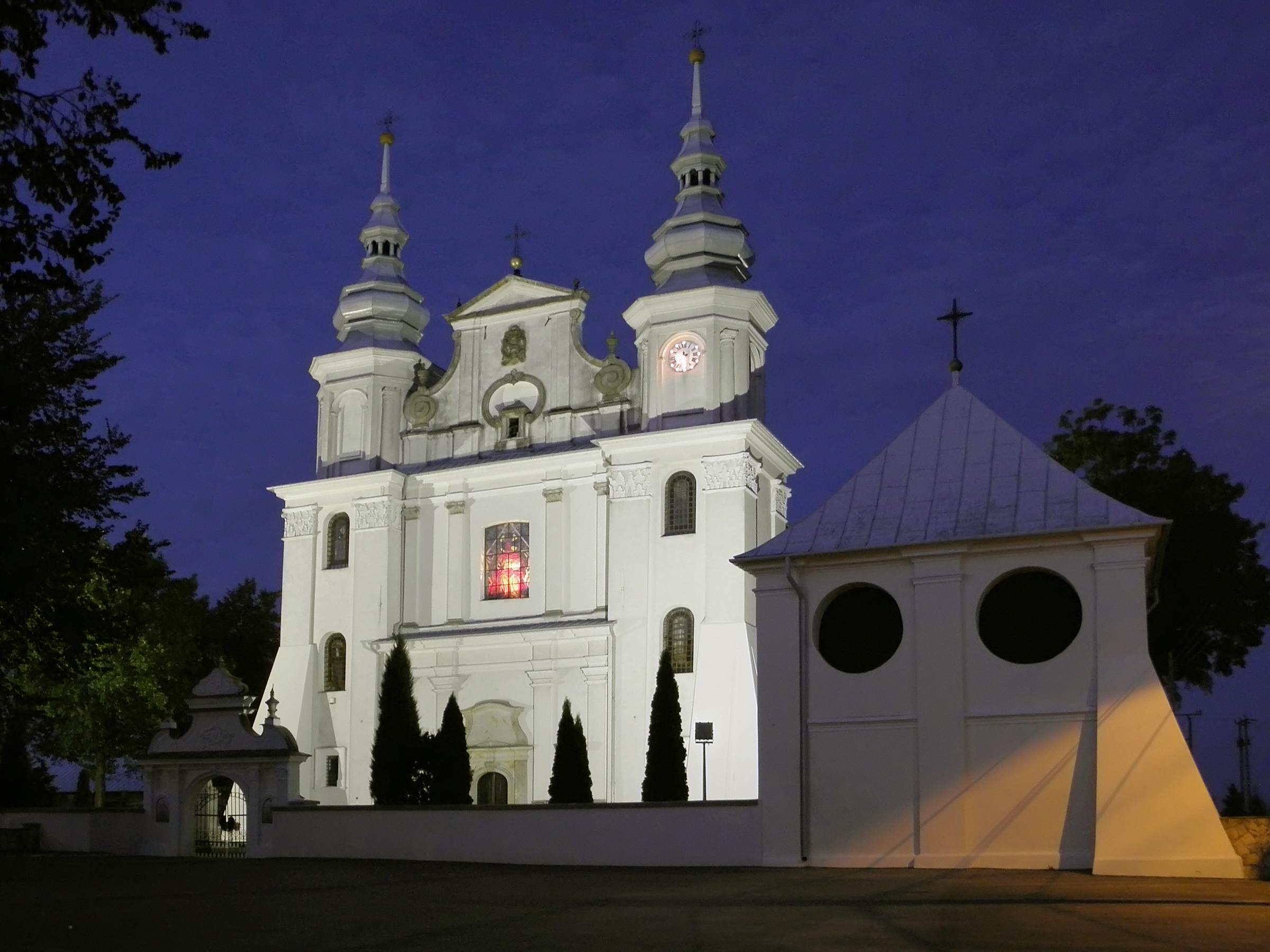
- Church of Saints Peter and Andrew

- Location within Poland
- Coordinates: 51°31′N 21°7′E
- Country: Poland
- Voivodeship: Masovian
- County: Radom
- Gmina: Jedlińsk

Population (approx.)
  - Total: 1,700
- Time zone: UTC+1 (CET)
  - Summer (DST): UTC+2 (CEST)
- Vehicle registration: WRA
- Website: https://www.jedlinsk.pl

Jedlińsk [ˈjɛdliɲsk] is a village in Radom County, Masovian Voivodeship, in east-central Poland. It is the seat of the gmina (administrative district) called Gmina Jedlińsk.

== Etymology ==
The name comes from pine trees (Polish: jodły), which were abundant in the area in the Middle Ages.

== History ==
Jedlińsk was granted town charter in the year 1530, upon an order of King Sigismund I the Old. At that time, it belonged to the Jedliński family (Nabram coat of arms), and in the second half of the 16th century, Jedlińsk emerged as one of centers of the Protestant Reformation in northern Lesser Poland. The town had a Calvinist prayer house, together with a school, which competed with the famous Racovian Academy (see also Polish Brethren). The school existed in 1560–1630, and in that period, Jedlińsk attracted many Scottish Calvinists, who founded a bell for the prayer house (the bell still exists).

In 1630–1669, Jedlińsk belonged to the Witowski family. It was administratively located in the Sandomierz Voivodeship in the Lesser Poland Province. The town was destroyed in the Swedish invasion of Poland, and never recovered from the destruction. Furthermore, it changed hands several times in the 18th century, belonging to a number of families. In 1794, Tadeusz Kosciuszko stayed here for a short time, on his way towards Warsaw. After the Third Partition of Poland in 1795, Jedlińsk shortly belonged to the Habsburg Empire. On 11 June 1809 a battle between the Polish Army and the Austrians took place here, during the Austro-Polish War. Following the Polish victory in the war, Jedlińsk became part of the short-lived Polish Duchy of Warsaw, and after the duchy's dissolution in 1815, the town became part of the Russian-controlled Congress Poland. The Russians stripped it of the town charter in 1869, as a punishment for the January Uprising. In 1890, the village burned in a fire. Jedlińsk has a parish church, which was destroyed by the Swedes in 1655, and remodelled in 1752.

In World War II, the Germans occupied Jedlińsk in September 1939. A local Polish policeman was murdered by the Russians in the Katyn massacre in 1940. After spring 1941, Jedlińsk's Jews, numbering around 750 before the war, were confined to a ghetto without reliable access to food. There is some evidence that a local priest allowed them to use the church passageway as a food smuggling point. In July or August 1942, the Jews were rounded up, a number shot on the spot, and the rest transferred to a ghetto in Białobrzegi. A few weeks later, they were deported to the Treblinka extermination camp, where they were immediately gassed. Only a few dozen of Jedlińsk's Jews were thought to have survived the war and Holocaust.
