= Owadów, Masovian Voivodeship =

Owadów
- Village
- Location within Poland
- Coordinates: 51°30′N 21°10′E
- Country: Poland
- Voivodeship: Masovian
- County: Radom
- Gmina: Jastrzębia
- Population (2021): 570

Owadów [ɔˈvaduf] is a village in the administrative district of Gmina Jastrzębia, within Radom County, Masovian Voivodeship, in east-central Poland.
