= Gózd, Radom County =

Gózd
- Village
- Location within Poland
- Coordinates: 51°22′11″N 21°25′27″E
- Country: Poland
- Voivodeship: Masovian
- County: Radom
- Gmina: Gózd
- Population: 800

Gózd [ɡust] is a village in Radom County, Masovian Voivodeship, in east-central Poland. It is the seat of the gmina (administrative district) called Gmina Gózd.
