= Gmina Jedlińsk =

Gmina Jedlińsk Jedlińsk Commune
- Gmina
- Coat of arms
- Interactive map of Gmina Jedlińsk
- Coordinates (Jedlińsk): 51°31′N 21°7′E
- Country: Poland
- Voivodeship: Masovian
- County: Radom County
- Seat: Jedlińsk

Area
  - Total: 138.72 km^{2} (53.56 sq mi)

Population (2006)
  - Total: 13,378
  - Density: 96.439/km^{2} (249.78/sq mi)
- Website: http://www.jedlinsk.pl/

Gmina Jedlińsk is a rural gmina (administrative district) in Radom County, Masovian Voivodeship, in east-central Poland. Its seat is the village of Jedlińsk, which lies approximately 14 kilometres (9 mi) north of Radom and 79 km (49 miles) south of Warsaw.

The gmina covers an area of 138.72 square kilometres (53.6 sq mi), and as of 2006 its total population is 13,378.

== Villages ==
Gmina Jedlińsk contains the villages and settlements of Bierwce, Bierwiecka Wola, Boża Wola, Bród, Budki Wierzchowskie, Czarna Rola, Czarny Ług, Godzisz, Górna Wola, Gryzów, Gutów, Janki, Jankowice, Jedlanka, Jedlińsk, Jeziorno, Józefów, Józefówek, Kamińsk, Kępiny, Klwatka Szlachecka, Klwaty, Kruszyna, Lisów, Ludwików, Marcelów, Moczydło, Mokrosęk, Narty, Nowa Wola, Nowe Zawady, Obózek, Piaseczno, Piaski, Piastów, Płasków, Romanów, Stare Zawady, Urbanów, Wielogóra, Wierzchowiny, Wola Gutowska and Wsola.

== Neighbouring gminas ==
Gmina Jedlińsk is bordered by the gminas of Głowaczów, Jastrzębia, Stara Błotnica, Stromiec and Zakrzew.
