= Jastrzębia, Radom County =

Jastrzębia
- Village
- Location within Poland
- Coordinates: 51°30′N 21°15′E
- Country: Poland
- Voivodeship: Masovian
- County: Radom
- Gmina: Jastrzębia
- Population: 820
- Website: www.jastrzebia.pl

Jastrzębia [jasˈtʂɛmbja] is a village in Radom County, Masovian Voivodeship, in east-central Poland. It is the seat of the gmina (administrative district) called Gmina Jastrzębia.
