= Gutów, Masovian Voivodeship =

Gutów
- Village
- Location within Poland
- Coordinates: 51°31′N 21°5′E
- Country: Poland
- Voivodeship: Masovian
- County: Radom
- Gmina: Jedlińsk

Gutów [ˈɡutuf] is a village in the administrative district of Gmina Jedlińsk, within Radom County, Masovian Voivodeship, in east-central Poland.
