= Gmina Gózd =

Gmina Gózd Gózd Commune
- Gmina
- Flag Coat of arms
- Interactive map of Gmina Gózd
- Coordinates (Gózd): 51°22′11″N 21°25′27″E
- Country: Poland
- Voivodeship: Masovian
- County: Radom County
- Seat: Gózd

Area
  - Total: 77.76 km^{2} (30.02 sq mi)

Population (2006)
  - Total: 8,052
  - Density: 103.5/km^{2} (268.2/sq mi)

Gmina Gózd is a rural gmina (administrative district) in Radom County, Masovian Voivodeship, in east-central Poland. Its seat is the village of Gózd, which lies approximately 15 kilometres (9 mi) east of Radom and 98 km (61 mi) south of Warsaw.

The gmina covers an area of 77.76 square kilometres (30.0 sq mi), and as of 2006 its total population is 8,052.

== Villages ==
Gmina Gózd contains the villages and settlements of Drożanki, Gózd, Grzmucin, Karszówka, Kiedrzyn, Kłonów, Kłonówek, Klwatka Królewska, Kuczki-Kolonia, Kuczki-Wieś, Lipiny, Małęczyn, Niemianowice, Piskornica, Podgóra and Wojsławice.

== Neighbouring gminas ==
Gmina Gózd is bordered by the city of Radom and by the gminas of Jedlnia-Letnisko, Pionki, Skaryszew, Tczów and Zwoleń.
