= Klwatka Królewska =

- Village
- Location within Poland
- Coordinates: 51°23′14″N 21°17′43″E
- Country: Poland
- Voivodeship: Masovian
- County: Radom
- Gmina: Gózd

Klwatka Królewska [ˈklvatka kruˈlɛfska] is a village in the administrative district of Gmina Gózd, within Radom County, Masovian Voivodeship, in east-central Poland.
