= Gmina Jastrzębia =

Gmina Jastrzębia Jastrzębia Commune
- Gmina
- Coat of arms
- Interactive map of Gmina Jastrzębia
- Coordinates (Jastrzębia): 51°30′N 21°15′E
- Country: Poland
- Voivodeship: Masovian
- County: Radom County
- Seat: Jastrzębia

Area
  - Total: 89.51 km^{2} (34.56 sq mi)

Population (2006)
  - Total: 6,448
  - Density: 72.04/km^{2} (186.6/sq mi)
- Website: http://www.jastrzebia.pl

Gmina Jastrzębia is a rural gmina (administrative district) in Radom County, Masovian Voivodeship, in east-central Poland. Its seat is the village of Jastrzębia, which lies approximately 12 kilometres (7 mi) north-east of Radom and 83 km (51 mi) south of Warsaw.

The gmina covers an area of 89.51 square kilometres (34.6 sq mi), and as of 2006 its total population is 6,448.

== Villages ==
Gmina Jastrzębia contains the villages and settlements of Bartodzieje, Brody, Dąbrowa Jastrzębska, Dąbrowa Kozłowska, Goryń, Jastrzębia, Kozłów, Lesiów, Lewaszówka, Mąkosy Nowe, Mąkosy Stare, Olszowa, Owadów, Wojciechów, Wola Goryńska, Wola Owadowska, Wólka Lesiowska and Wolska Dąbrowa.

== Neighbouring gminas ==
Gmina Jastrzębia is bordered by the city of Radom and by the gminas of Głowaczów, Jedlińsk, Jedlnia-Letnisko and Pionki.
