= Bartodzieje, Radom County =

Bartodzieje
- Village
- Location within Poland
- Coordinates: 51°32′N 21°11′E
- Country: Poland
- Voivodeship: Masovian
- County: Radom
- Gmina: Jastrzębia
- Population (2021): 525
- Website: http://bartodzieje.pl

Bartodzieje [bartɔˈd͡ʑɛjɛ] is a village in the administrative district of Gmina Jastrzębia, within Radom County, Masovian Voivodeship, in east-central Poland.
