= Radom County =

Radom County Powiat radomski
- County
- Flag Coat of arms

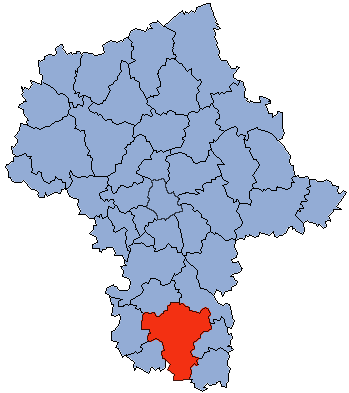
- Location within the voivodeship

- Division into gminas
- Coordinates (Radom): 51°24′N 21°10′E
- Country: Poland
- Voivodeship: Masovian
- Seat: Radom
- Gminas: Total 13 (incl. 1 urban): Pionki; Gmina Gózd; Gmina Iłża; Gmina Jastrzębia; Gmina Jedlińsk; Gmina Jedlnia-Letnisko; Gmina Kowala; Gmina Pionki; Gmina Przytyk; Gmina Skaryszew; Gmina Wierzbica; Gmina Wolanów; Gmina Zakrzew

Area
  - Total: 1,529.75 km^{2} (590.64 sq mi)

Population (2019)
  - Total: 152,190
  - Density: 99.487/km^{2} (257.67/sq mi)
  - Urban: 27,373
  - Rural: 124,817
- Car plates: WRA
- Website: www.radompowiat.pl

Radom County (Polish: powiat radomski) is a unit of territorial administration and local government (powiat) in Masovian Voivodeship, east-central Poland. It came into being on January 1, 1999, as a result of the Polish local government reforms passed in 1998. Its administrative seat is the city of Radom, although the city is not part of the county (it constitutes a separate city county). The county contains three towns: Pionki, 22 km (14 mi) north-east of Radom, Iłża, 27 km (17 mi) south of Radom, and Skaryszew, 12 km (7 mi) south-east of Radom.

The county covers an area of 1,529.75 square kilometres (590.6 sq mi). As of 2019 its total population is 152,190, out of which the population of Pionki is 18,269, that of Iłża is 4,733, that of Skaryszew is 4,371, and the rural population is 124,817.

== Neighbouring counties ==
Apart from the city of Radom, Radom County is also bordered by Białobrzegi County to the north, Kozienice County to the north-east, Zwoleń County to the east, Lipsko County to the south-east, Starachowice County to the south, Szydłowiec County to the south-west and Przysucha County to the west.

== Administrative divisions ==
The county is subdivided into 13 gminas (one urban, two urban-rural and 10 rural). These are listed in the following table, in descending order of population.

Gmina	Type	Area (km^{2})	Population (2019)	Seat
Pionki	urban	18.3	18,269	
Gmina Skaryszew	urban-rural	171.4	14,765	Skaryszew
Gmina Iłża	urban-rural	255.8	14,701	Iłża
Gmina Jedlińsk	rural	138.7	14,529	Jedlińsk
Gmina Zakrzew	rural	96.2	13,125	Zakrzew
Gmina Jedlnia-Letnisko	rural	65.6	12,788	Jedlnia-Letnisko
Gmina Kowala	rural	74.7	12,207	Kowala
Gmina Pionki	rural	230.8	10,023	Pionki *
Gmina Wierzbica	rural	94.0	9,698	Wierzbica
Gmina Gózd	rural	77.8	8,933	Gózd
Gmina Wolanów	rural	82.9	8,858	Wolanów
Gmina Przytyk	rural	134.1	7,307	Przytyk
Gmina Jastrzębia	rural	89.5	6,987	Jastrzębia
* seat not part of the gmina

== History ==
The history of Radom County dates back to the Middle Ages, when the city of Radom was the seat of a castellany. In the first half of the 14th century, the castellanies were changed into counties, and newly created Radom County became part of Lesser Polands’ Sandomierz Voivodeship. In 1476, there were seven counties in this voivodeship: Sandomierz, Wislica, Checiny, Opoczno, Stezyca and Radom.

Boundaries of Radom County remained unchanged for centuries, until the Partitions of Poland. At that time, it was much larger than contemporary county: its total area was 5782 sq. kilometers, with such towns, as Ilza, Skaryszew, Szydlowiec, Wierzbnik, Skrzynno, Sieciechow, Solec nad Wisla and Kozienice. Eastern and northern boundaries of Radom County also marked borders of Lesser Poland, in the west, it bordered Opoczno County of Sandomierz Voivodeship, and in the south, Sandomierz County of Sandomierz Voivodeship.

After the third partition of Poland, Radom County became part of Radom Department of the Duchy of Warsaw. In 1816, Sandomierz Voivodeship was recreated, with its seat in Radom. In 1837, Radom County became part of Radom Governorate of Russian-controlled Congress Poland. In the Second Polish Republic, Radom County was part of Kielce Voivodeship (1919–39).
