= Lucyna Wiśniewska =

Polish politician (1955–2022)

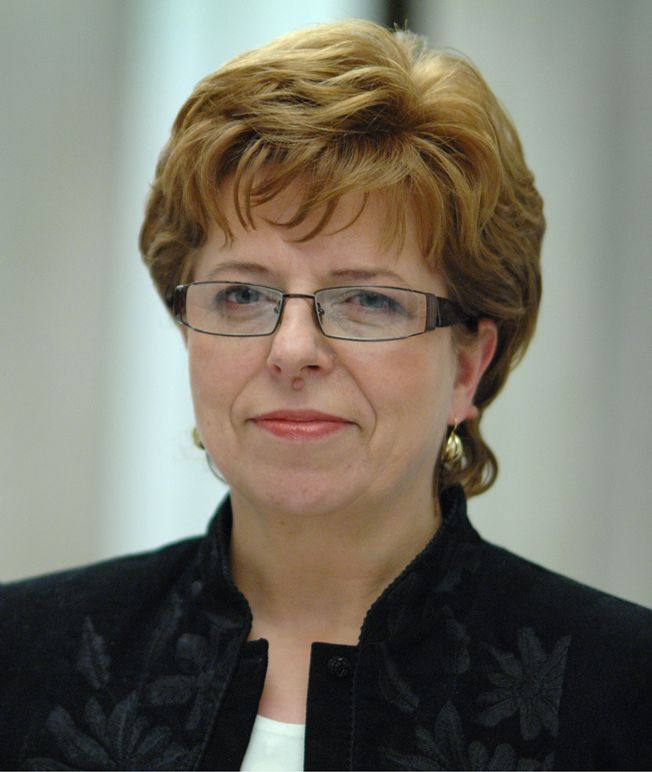

Member of Sejm 2005-2007
- In office 25 September 2005 – 2007

Personal details
- Born: 30 June 1955 Skaryszew, Poland
- Died: 30 October 2022 (aged 67) Modrzejowice, Poland
- Party: Law and Justice, Right Wing of the Republic

Lucyna Emilia Wiśniewska (Polish pronunciation: [luˈtsɨna vʲiɕˈɲɛfska]; 30 June 1955 – 30 October 2022) was a Polish politician. She was elected to the Sejm on 25 September 2005, getting 10,846 votes in 17 Radom district as a candidate from the Law and Justice list.

On 27 April 2007, she changed her political affiliation and joined the Right Wing of the Republic party.

Wiśniewska died in a car accident on 30 October 2022, at the age of 67.

== See also ==
- Members of Polish Sejm 2005-2007
