= Yehudah Yudel Rosenberg =

Jewish rabbi and author

Rabbi Yehudah Yudel Rosenberg
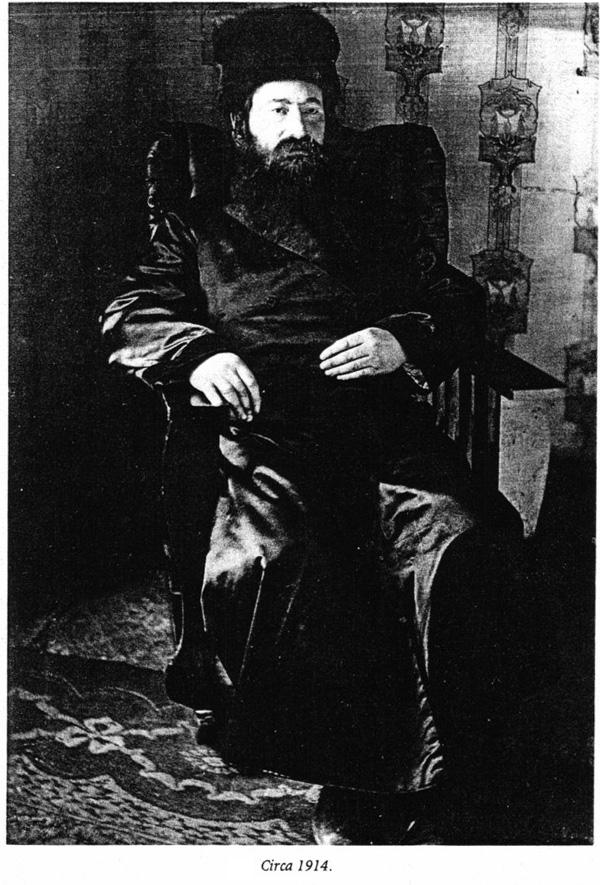
- Rosenberg in c. 1914

Personal life
- Born: Judka Rozenberg; 24 December 1860 Gębarzów, Poland
- Died: 23 October 1935 (aged 74) Montreal, Quebec, Canada
- Buried: Baron de Hirsch Cemetery, Montreal
- Relations: Mordecai Richler (grandson), Rabbi Michael Rosensweig (great-grandson)

Religious life
- Religion: Judaism

Yehudah Yudel Rosenberg (Yiddish: יהודה יודל ראזענבערג, Hebrew: יהודה יודל רוזנברג; 24 December 1860 – 23 October 1935) was a rabbi, author, and Jewish communal leader in Poland and Canada. He is best known for his Hebrew translation of the Zohar, and for popularizing the tale of the Golem of Prague.

== Biography ==
Rosenberg was born Judka Rozenberg on 24 December 1860 in Gębarzów, Poland (near Radom), the son of Maria Gitla (née Cygielman) and Izrael Icek Rozenberg. He grew up in the nearby town of Skaryszew, Poland. As a young boy, he was known as "the Illui of Skorishev".

At age 17, he married Chaya Chava, the daughter of Shlomo Elimelech of Tarlow, granddaughter of the Otrovtzer Rav, Rabbi Liebish Zucker. After receiving his rabbinic designation from such great rabbinical authorities of the time as the Ostrovtzer Rebbe, he served as rabbi in Tarlow (and thus became known in Poland as Rebbe Yudel Tarler), Lublin, Warsaw, and Lodz.

In 1913, Rosenberg immigrated to Canada, where he became the spiritual leader of Toronto's Beth Jacob Congregation, which was founded in 1899 by a group of Polish-born Jews. During his close to six years in the city, Rosenberg founded the Eitz Chaim Talmud Torah on D'Arcy Street, in a building which once was an Italian club. He moved to Montreal in 1919, where he became the Chief Rabbi of the United Hebrew Orthodox Congregations, a group of synagogues serving immigrant Ashkenazi communities, and vice-chairman of the Jewish Community's Rabbinic Council, which he served as until his death in Montreal at age seventy-five on October 23, 1935.

Among Rosenberg's notable descendants are Shlomo-Yisrael Ben-Meir, Meir Yehoshua Magnes, Mordecai Richler and Rabbi Michael Rosensweig.

== Work ==
Rabbi Rosenberg was a prolific author. Besides numerous halakhic works, his writing ranged from an anthology of the sciences (Sefer ha-Berit), which was a source of scientific knowledge for Jews unfamiliar with European languages, to a Hebrew translation of the Zohar, which he hoped would revive interest in Kabbalah.

He is perhaps most famous for his stories about the Golem of Prague, which he attributed to the Maharal of Prague, published in Hebrew as Niflaʼot Maharal (1909). Rosenberg himself later translated the Hebrew text into a rather different Yiddish version, also available in English translation. Rosenberg's text claims to be an edition of a three-hundred-year-old manuscript found in an imperial library in Metz, but recent scholarship recognises the text as a fictional work by Rosenberg and a literary hoax. Rather than being based on an old manuscript, it lifts plots and characters directly from The Jew's Breastplate by Sir Arthur Conan Doyle, and R. Yudl himself admitted copying directly from a Russian translation of Doyle. Not so much a case of forgery as one of mischaracterization, as Shnayer Leiman notes, there is evidence that R. Yudl himself admitted the stories were meant to be popular fiction.

=== Publications ===
- Zeh sefer Nifleʼot MaHaRa"L : bo yesupar ha-otot ṿeha-moftim ... me-et ... Maharal mi-Prag ... asher hifli laʻas̀ot ha-golem (Podgorze etsel Ḳraḳo : Bi-defus Shaʼul Ḥanaya' Daiṭsher, 669 [1909]) [repr. ha-Golem mi-Prag : u-maʻaśim niflaʼim aḥerim, ed. by ʻEli Yasif (Yerushalayim : Mosad Byaliḳ, 1991)]
- Refaʼel ha-malʼakh : be-sefer zeh niḳbetsu segulot ṿe- ḳameʻot ʻal kol tsarah she-lo tavo ... refuʼot moʻilot le-harbeh maḥalot ... leḥashim le-harbeh maḥalot ... (Pyeṭrḳov : Bi-defus Shelomoh Belkhaṭoṿsḳi, 671, 1911)
- Tifʼeret Maharal mi-Shpoli ha-niḳra "Der Shpoler zeyde" : ba-sefer ha-zeh yesupar toladeto tsidḳato ḳedushato u-moftaṿ ha-gedolim ṿeha-noraʼim asher herʼah be-yamaṿ ... maran Aryeh Leb mi-Shpoli (Pyetrḳov : Bi-defus Ḥanokh Henikh b. ha-r. Yeshay' Volf Folman, 672, 1912) [repr. [Yerushalayim?] [1968*9]; Yerushalayim : Karmel, 758, 1997]
- Sefer Ḳeriʼah ha-ḳedoshah : hu shulḥan ʻarukh ʻal hilkhot ṿe-minhagim shel ḳeriʼat ha-Torah (Nuyorḳ : Rozenberg Prinṭing, 679 [1919]) [partially repr. מזמור לתודה : דין ברכת הגומל מתוך ספר קריװןײה הקדושה /$cמװןײת יהודה יודל רװןײזענבערג ... ; בתוספת מרװןײי מקומות, הערות וחילוקי הלכות למנהג עדות המזרח והמװןײמרים ׳ברכת הגומל לחוזרים מפעילות צבװןײית׳, ברכת הגומל לנוסע בכבישי יש״ע, ע״י מװןײיר יהושע בן־מװןײיר. [Mizmor le-todah : din birkat ha-gomel mi-tokh sefer Ḳeriʼah ha-ḳedoshah] ([Israel, 2003]; repr. Sefer ḳerʼiah ha-ḳedoshah : hu shulḥan ʻarukh ʻal hilkhot ṿe-minhagim shel ḳeriʼat ha-Torah (Yerushalayim: [M. Ben Meʼir], 764- [2003 or 2004-])
- Sefer Yedot nedarim: ṿe-hu beʼur maspiḳ ʻal kol kelomar asher be-fe.Rashi ṿeha-Ran u-sheʼar meḳomot ha-ḳashim shebe-masekhet Nedarim (Ṿarsha : Y. Ḳnaster, 1925)
- Sefer Nifle'ot ha-Zohar (Monṭreal bi-defus "Siṭi prinṭing Ḳo." 1927)
- Miḳṿeh Yehudah: ... la-ʻaśot be-khol bayit mikṿeh ḳaṭan ... (Toronto: s.n., [1919])
- " Divrei Hayamim Asher Leshlomo" (Pietrokov 1914)
