= Grabina =

Grabina may refer to the following places:

- Grabina, Łask County in Łódź Voivodeship (central Poland)
- Grabina, Łódź East County in Łódź Voivodeship (central Poland)
- Grabina, Poddębice County in Łódź Voivodeship (central Poland)
- Grabina, Lesser Poland Voivodeship (south Poland)
- Grabina, Świętokrzyskie Voivodeship (south-central Poland)
- Grabina, Białobrzegi County in Masovian Voivodeship (east-central Poland)
- Grabina, Garwolin County in Masovian Voivodeship (east-central Poland)
- Grabina, Kozienice County in Masovian Voivodeship (east-central Poland)
- Grabina, Gmina Halinów in Masovian Voivodeship (east-central Poland)
- Grabina, Gmina Mińsk Mazowiecki in Masovian Voivodeship (east-central Poland)
- Grabina, Płock County in Masovian Voivodeship (east-central Poland)
- Grabina, Gmina Kowala in Masovian Voivodeship (east-central Poland)
- Grabina, Gmina Skaryszew in Masovian Voivodeship (east-central Poland)
- Grabina, Warsaw West County in Masovian Voivodeship (east-central Poland)
- Grabina, Koło County in Greater Poland Voivodeship (west-central Poland)
- Grabina, Gmina Ostrowite in Greater Poland Voivodeship (west-central Poland)
- Grabina, Gmina Zagórów in Greater Poland Voivodeship (west-central Poland)
- Grabina, Silesian Voivodeship (south Poland)
- Grabina, Opole Voivodeship (south-west Poland)
- Grabina, West Pomeranian Voivodeship (north-west Poland)
