= Włada Bytomska =

Polish trade union activist

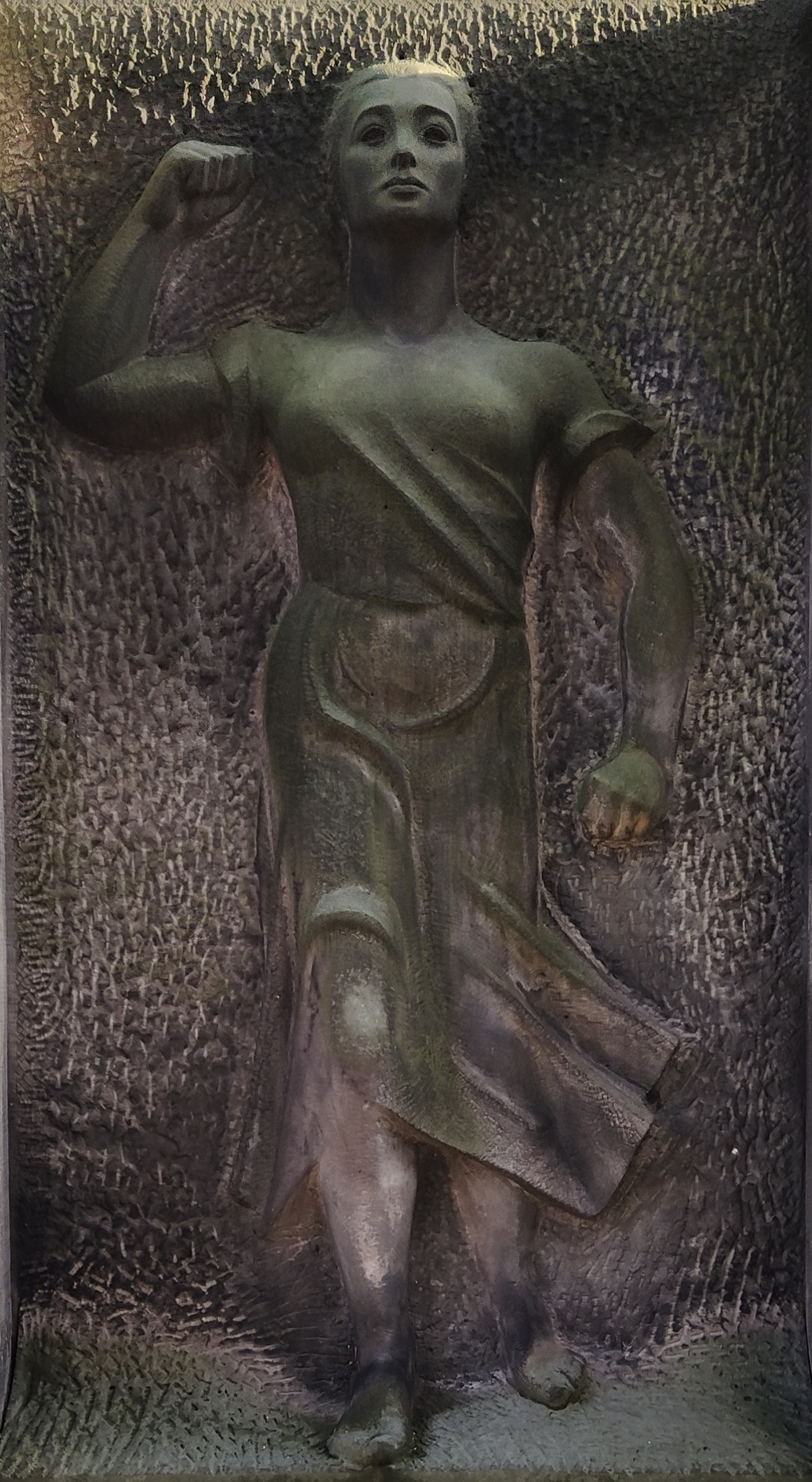
- A bas-relief of Bytomska by the sculptor Hanna Nałkowska
- Born: Władysława Bytomska; 16 October 1904; Łódź, Piotrków Governorate, Vistula Land
- Died: 3 November 1938 (aged 34); Łódź, Łódź Voivodeship, Second Polish Republic
- Cause of death: Murdered by immolation
- Occupation: Spinner
- Years active: 1927–1938
- Era: 20th century
- Political party: KPP
- Other political affiliations: ZMKwP; PPS–L
- Movement: Communism
- Partner: Józef Sroczyński
- Parents: Wawrzyniec Bytomski (father); Michalina née Borowiak (mother)

Włada Bytomska (1904-1938) was a Polish factory worker, songwriter, trade union organiser and member of the Communist Party of Poland (KPP) who was active in interbellum Łódź. She was murdered by unknown assailants in 1938 and became a martyr in the Polish People's Republic.

== Biography ==
=== Early life ===
Bytomska was born in Łódź on 16 October 1904. Both her parents were migrant workers with her mother, Michalina (née Borowiak), and father, Wawrzyniec Bytomski, coming from Lipiny and Sieradz Land respectively. She was the eldest of 11 siblings and, due to her family's poverty, had to work on farms outside of Łódź whilst at school. After completing formal education, she began working in factories from the age of 17 or 18.

=== Activism ===
In 1927 Bytomska and her sister Maria joined the Polish Socialist Party – Left (PPS-L). The following year, she gave a speech during a rally in support of a factory strike. This brought her to the attention of the State Police (PP) who subsequently searched her lodgings and found illegal literature. As a result, Bytomska was arrested and sentenced to 4 years imprisonment, reduced to 3 on appeal. During her time in prison Bytomska composed revolutionary songs, including Towarzysz Harnam, an ode to Szaja Charnam which would become popular amongst Polish communists. After being released from prison in 1931 she began a relationship with a KPP member named Józef Sroczyński. However, the following year, Sroczyński was accused by his comrades of being an informant after a planned meeting had been broken up by police. Several KPP members had been arrested, including Władysław Gomułka who sustained a bullet wound and identified Sroczyński as the informer. Around this time, Bytomska was again arrested whilst organising a factory strike in Ozorków, and sentenced to a further prison sentence. She suspected Sroczyński of having betrayed her too and, on her release, shared her suspicions with the KPP leadership. Sroczyński was sent to the USSR by the party after which he disappeared.

=== Death ===
In 1938, Bytomska became a leading figure in another industrial dispute against her then-employer. On 2 November, she told factory colleagues that she was going to attend a meeting called by the KPP regarding strike action at 10 pm that evening. At around 11 pm an officer of the PP discovered the immolated body of a naked woman. The unconscious victim was taken to the hospital, where she died the following morning. The doctor treating the victim determined that there were signs she had been bound and a PP search of the area in which she was found uncovered evidence of a gag. On 4 November, Wawrzyniec Bytomski reported Bytomska missing and was able to identify the remains of the victim as his daughter. He also gave a suicide note to detectives in Bytomska's handwriting which was used as evidence by the PP to conclude that she had taken her own life.

A post-war investigation by the Security Office (UB) was inconclusive. The main suspect in their investigation was Bytomska's brother in law, but no charges were brought against him and the case was finally closed in 1954. Since the investigation another hypothesis has been put forward that Bytomska's death was coordinated by Sroczyński's family in revenge for his disappearance.

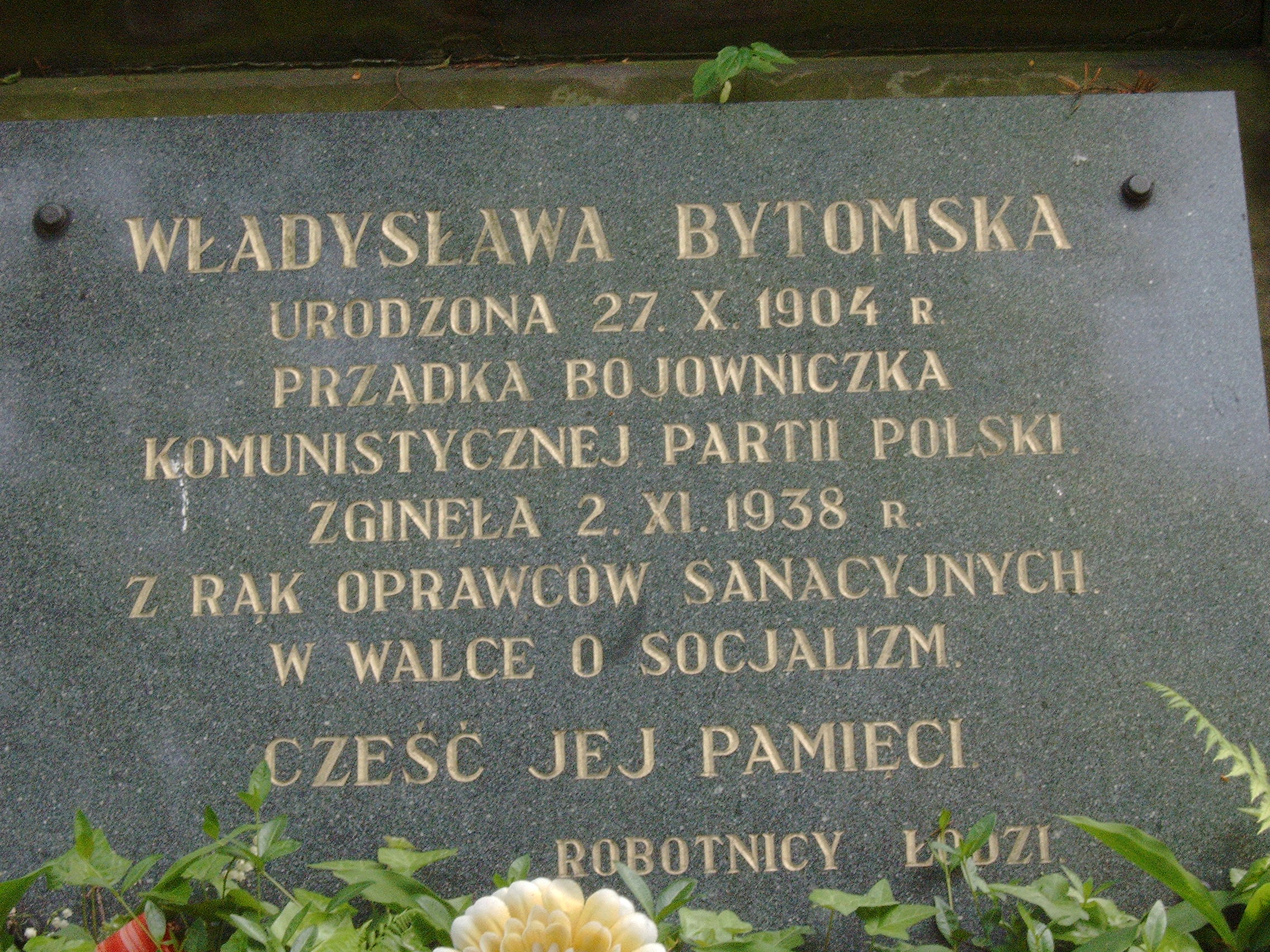
Bytomska's gravestone which describes her as a victim of Sanation violence

== Legacy ==
In 1948, Bytomska's remains were exhumed and transferred to the Doły cemetery in Łódź. A new tombstone was erected in her honour and an estimated 10,000 workers attended its unveiling. A housing estate was later named in her honour.
