= Niecki =

Niecki may refer to the following places:

- Niecki, Łódź Voivodeship (central Poland)
- Niecki, Masovian Voivodeship (east-central Poland)
- Niecki, Podlaskie Voivodeship (north-east Poland)
