= Congregation Beth Jacob =

Congregation Beth Jacob may refer to:

- Congregation Beth Jacob (Atlanta), Georgia, in the United States
- Congregation Beth Jacob Ohev Sholom, Brooklyn, New York, in the United States
- Congregation Beth Jacob (Galveston, Texas), in the United States

== Also ==
- Beth Jacob Congregation (Beverly Hills, California), in the United States
- Beth Jacob Congregation (Mendota Heights, Minnesota), in the United States
- Beth Jacob Social Hall and Congregation, Miami Beach, Florida, in the United States
- Beth Jacob V'Anshei Drildz, Toronto, in Canada
- Beth Yaacov Synagogue (Madrid), in Spain
- Beth Yaakov Synagogue, Geneva, in Switzerland
