= Zygmunt Zaleski =

Polish literature historian, literary critic, poet, publicist and translator

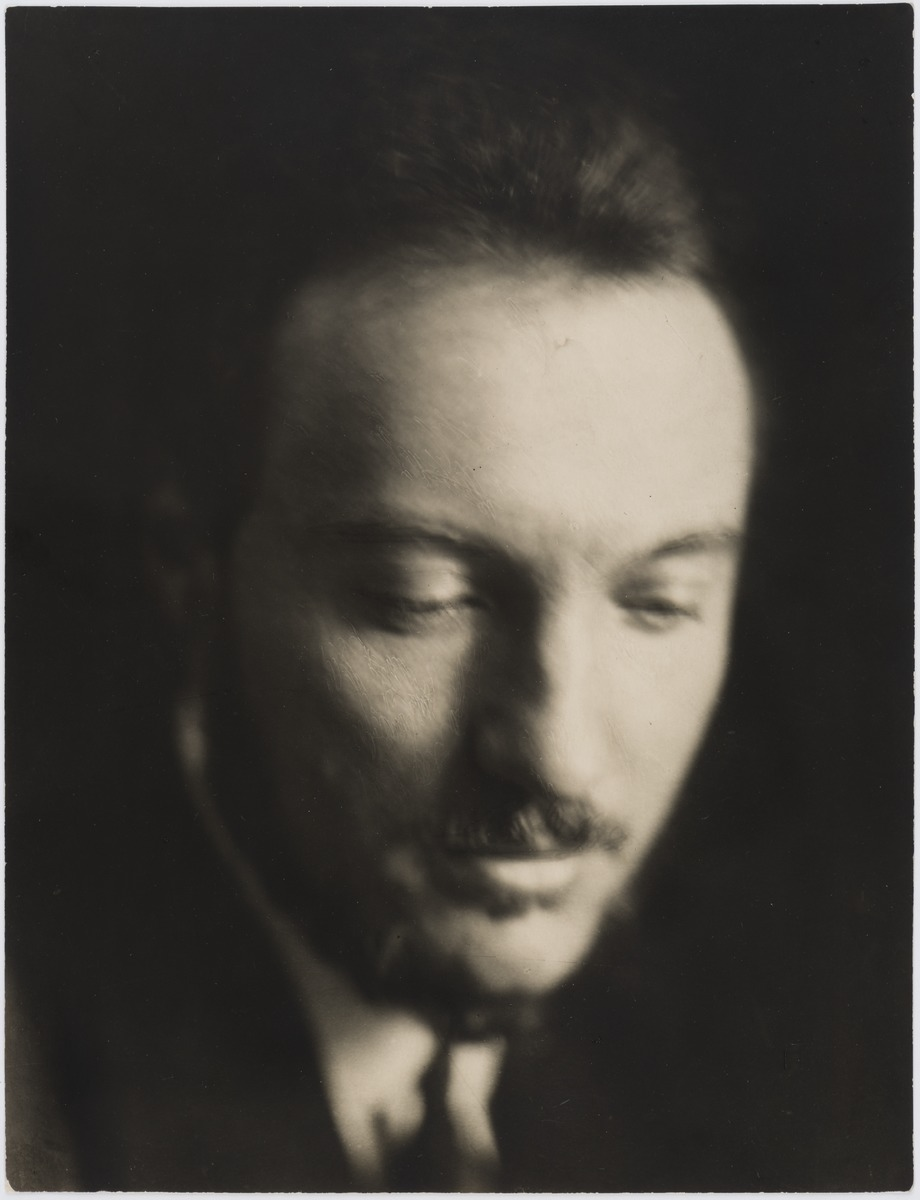
- Zygmunt Lubicz-Zaleski, a photograph by Piotr Szumow from 1918
- Born: 13 October 1898; Klonówiec, Vistula land
- Died: 15 December 1967 (aged 85); Paris, France
- Education: Cantemir Vodă National College
- Occupations: Historyian; Literary critic Poet; Publicist; Translator
- Writing career
- Language: Polish

Zygmunt Zaleski of Lubicz coat of arms (29 September 1882 in Kłonowiec-Koracz near the Kielce, Poland – 15 December 1967 in Paris, France), pseudonymes R. de Bron, R. Debron, was a Polish literature historian, literary critic, poet, publicist, and translator. Awarded the Légion d'honneur.

Zaleski was an editor of Polak, magazine of Polish Army in France (1918–1919). He was a co-editor of Collection Polonaise, a series of French language translations of Polish literature. Awarded the Golden Laurel of Polish Academy of Literature (Złoty Wawrzyn Polskiej Akademii Literatury; 1938). He was also an editor of Życie Sztuki (1935–1939).

== Notable works ==
- Zygmunt Krasiński. O dziełach i życiu poety w setną rocznicę urodzin (1912)
- Dzieło i twórca. Studia i wrażenia literackie (1913)
- Na wąskiej miedzy snu i burzy (1914) – collection of poems
- O rzeczach błahych i wiecznych (Paris, 1929)
- Attitudes et destinées. Faces et profils d'écrivains polonais (Paris, 1932)
- Geniusz z urojenia (1932) – drama
- Akordy kamienne (Hannover, 1946) – poetic prose
- Wiersze zebrane 1924–1967 (Aix en Provence, 1969) – collection of works published posthumously
