= Odechów, Masovian Voivodeship =

Odechów
- Village
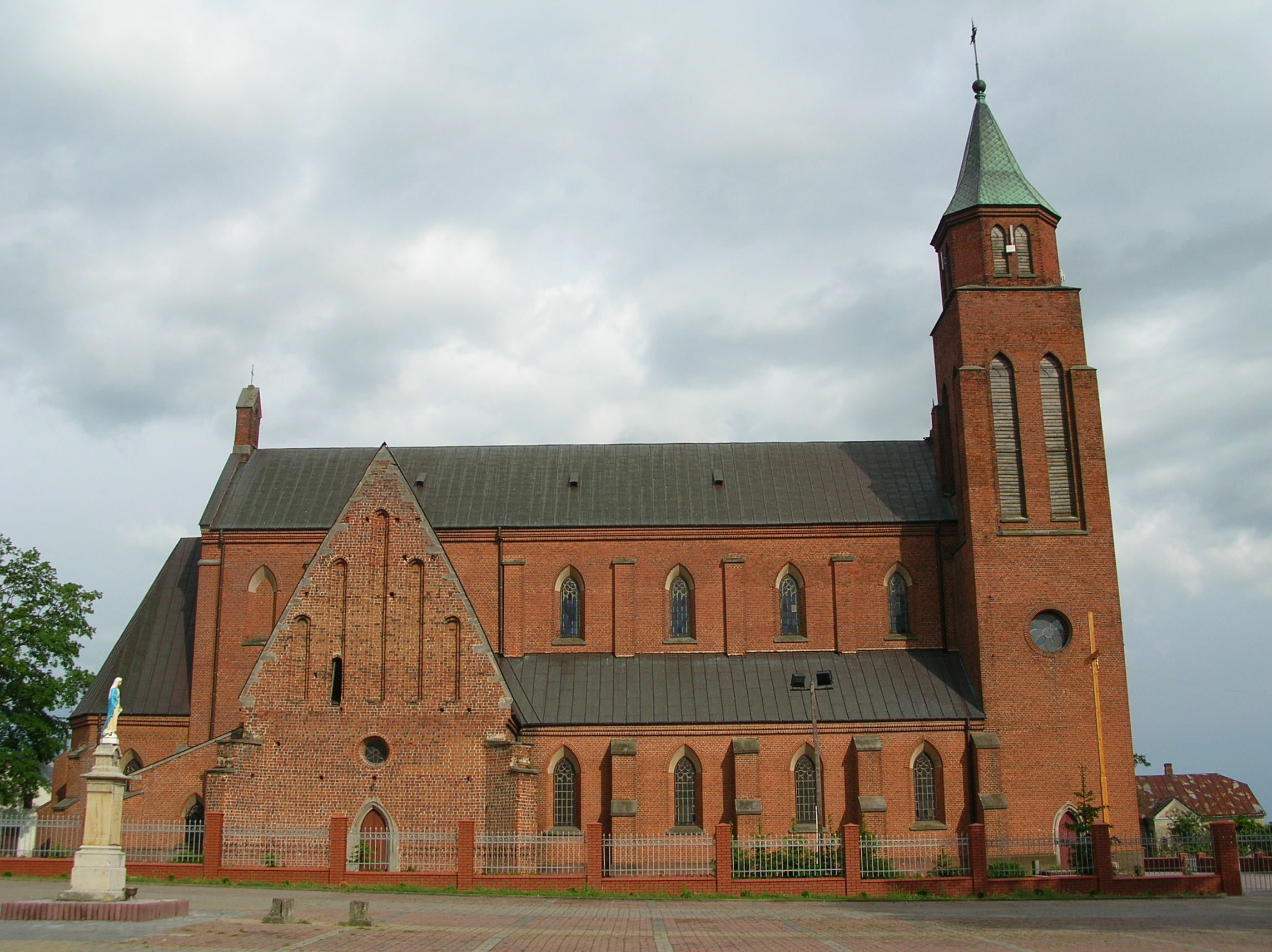

- Location within Poland
- Coordinates: 51°18′N 21°21′E
- Country: Poland
- Voivodeship: Masovian
- County: Radom
- Gmina: Skaryszew
- Population: 490

Odechów [ɔˈdɛxuf] is a village in the administrative district of Gmina Skaryszew, within Radom County, Masovian Voivodeship, in east-central Poland. The village was officially a town from 1573 until the late 17th century.

Odechów is one of the oldest villages of Lesser Poland's Land of Radom. It was first mentioned in documents from 1228, and received Magdeburg rights as Nowy Targ (later Miasteczko Odechowskie) in 1578. Its name probably comes from the fact that in the Kingdom of Poland, it was located along the oxen trail from Rus’ to Silesia and Greater Poland. Merchants with their cattle would stop here to rest (dla odechu). Odechów remained a very small town, located too close to the ancient urban center of Skaryszew. Finally, it was stripped of its charter some time in the second half of the 17th century.

Odechów is famous for its ancient church, which was first built as a wooden complex by Mikolaj Traba between 1404 and 1411. Between 1459 and 1460, Jan Długosz built a new, brick church, which was greatly expanded between 1911 and 1913, following a design of Zygmunt Slominski, an architect from Radom.
