= Miasteczko (disambiguation) =

Miasteczko is a historical type of settlement similar to "market town", also known as "shtetl" when predominantly Jewish.

Miasteczko may also refer to:

- Miasteczko, Masovian Voivodeship, a place in Poland
- Miasteczko Krajeńskie, a place in Poland
- Miasteczko Śląskie, a place in Poland
- Miasteczko (TV series), a 1999-2000 Polish TV series directed by Maciej Wojtyszko
