= Wódka =

Wódka may refer to:

- Wódka, the Polish word for vodka
  - Wódka (Vodka), a brand of vodka produced by Polmos Białystok
- Wódka, Łódź Voivodeship (central Poland)
- Wódka, Opole Voivodeship (south-west Poland)
