= Maków Nowy =

Village in Gmina Skaryszew, Poland

- Village
- Location within Poland
- Coordinates: 51°21′52″N 21°13′25″E
- Country: Poland
- Voivodeship: Masovian
- County: Radom
- Gmina: Skaryszew
- Population: 200

Maków Nowy [ˈmakuf ˈnɔvɨ] is a village in the administrative district of Gmina Skaryszew, within Radom County, Masovian Voivodeship, in east-central Poland.
