= Moskwa, Łódź Voivodeship =

Moskwa
- Village
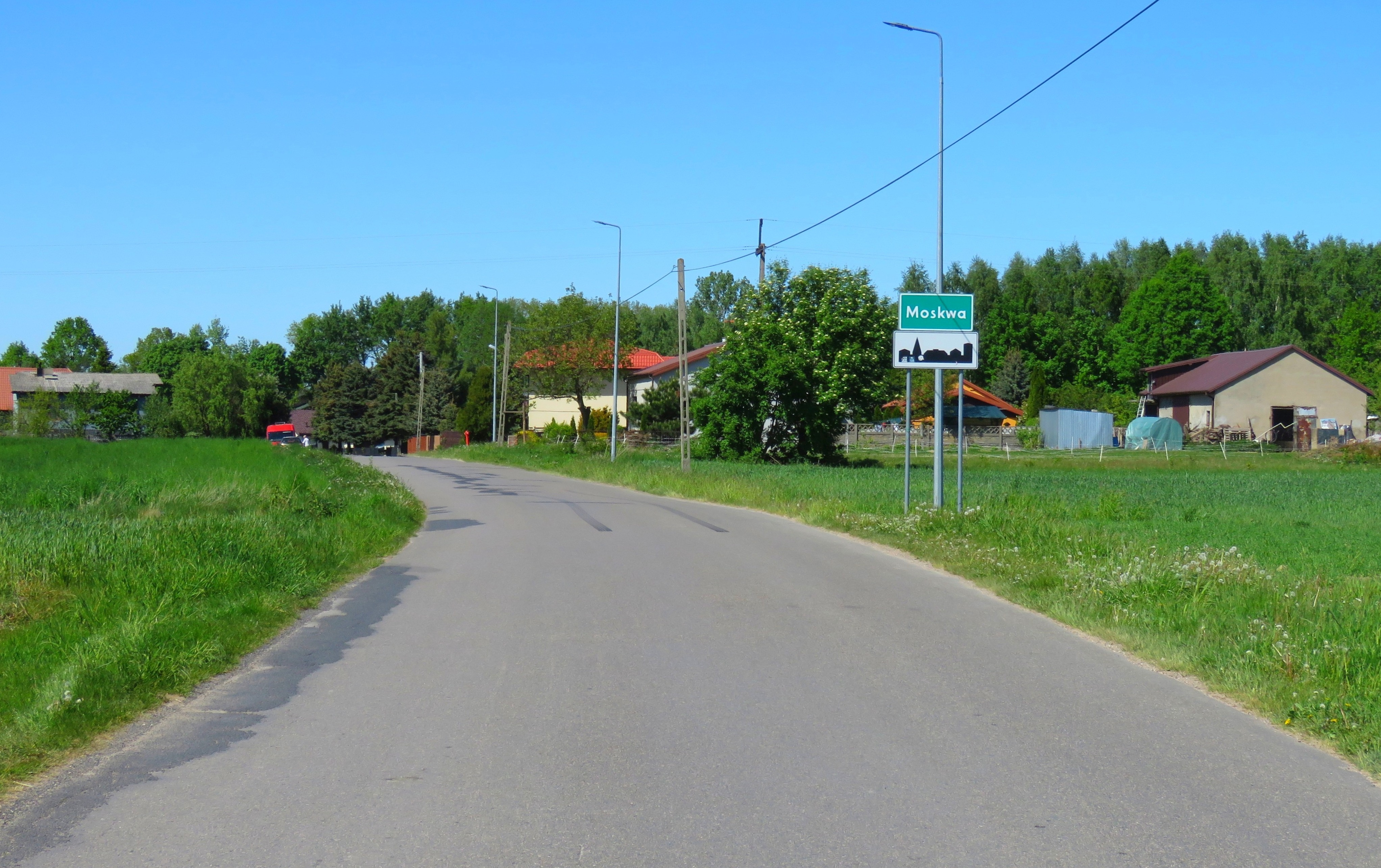

- Location within Poland
- Coordinates: 51°48′52″N 19°39′25″E
- Country: Poland
- Voivodeship: Łódź
- County: Łódź East
- Gmina: Nowosolna
- Elevation: 240 m (790 ft)

Moskwa [ˈmɔskfa] is a village in the administrative district of Gmina Nowosolna, within Łódź East County, Łódź Voivodeship, in central Poland. (Moskwa is the Polish name for Moscow.)
