= Kalonka, Łódź Voivodeship =

Kalonka
- Village
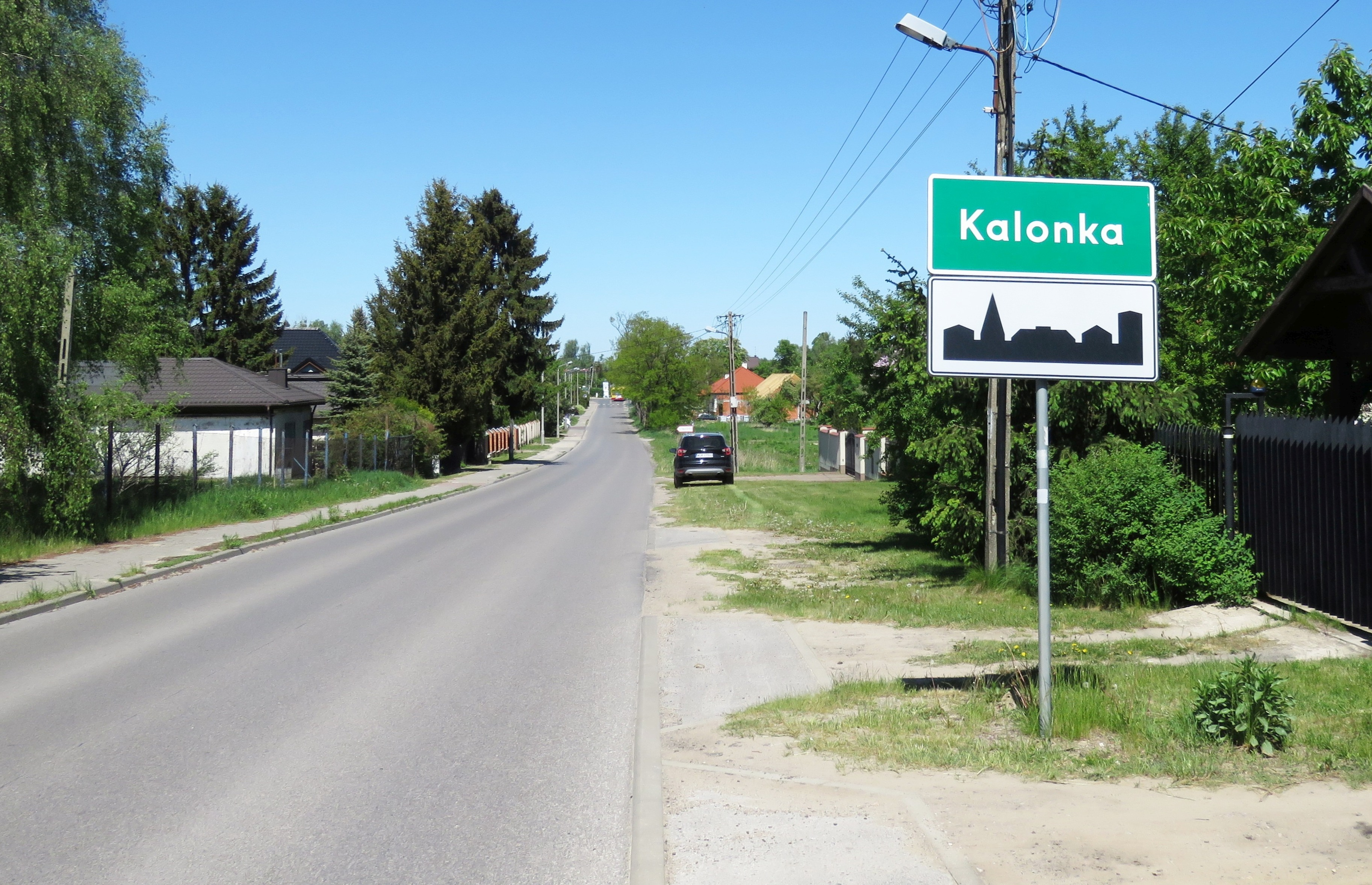

- Location within Poland
- Coordinates: 51°49′47″N 19°34′35″E
- Country: Poland
- Voivodeship: Łódź
- County: Łódź East
- Gmina: Nowosolna
- Population (approx.): 100
- Website: http://www.kalonka.com

Kalonka [kaˈlɔnka] is a village in the administrative district of Gmina Nowosolna, within Łódź East County, Łódź Voivodeship, in central Poland.

The village has an approximate population of 100.
