= Byszewy =

- Village
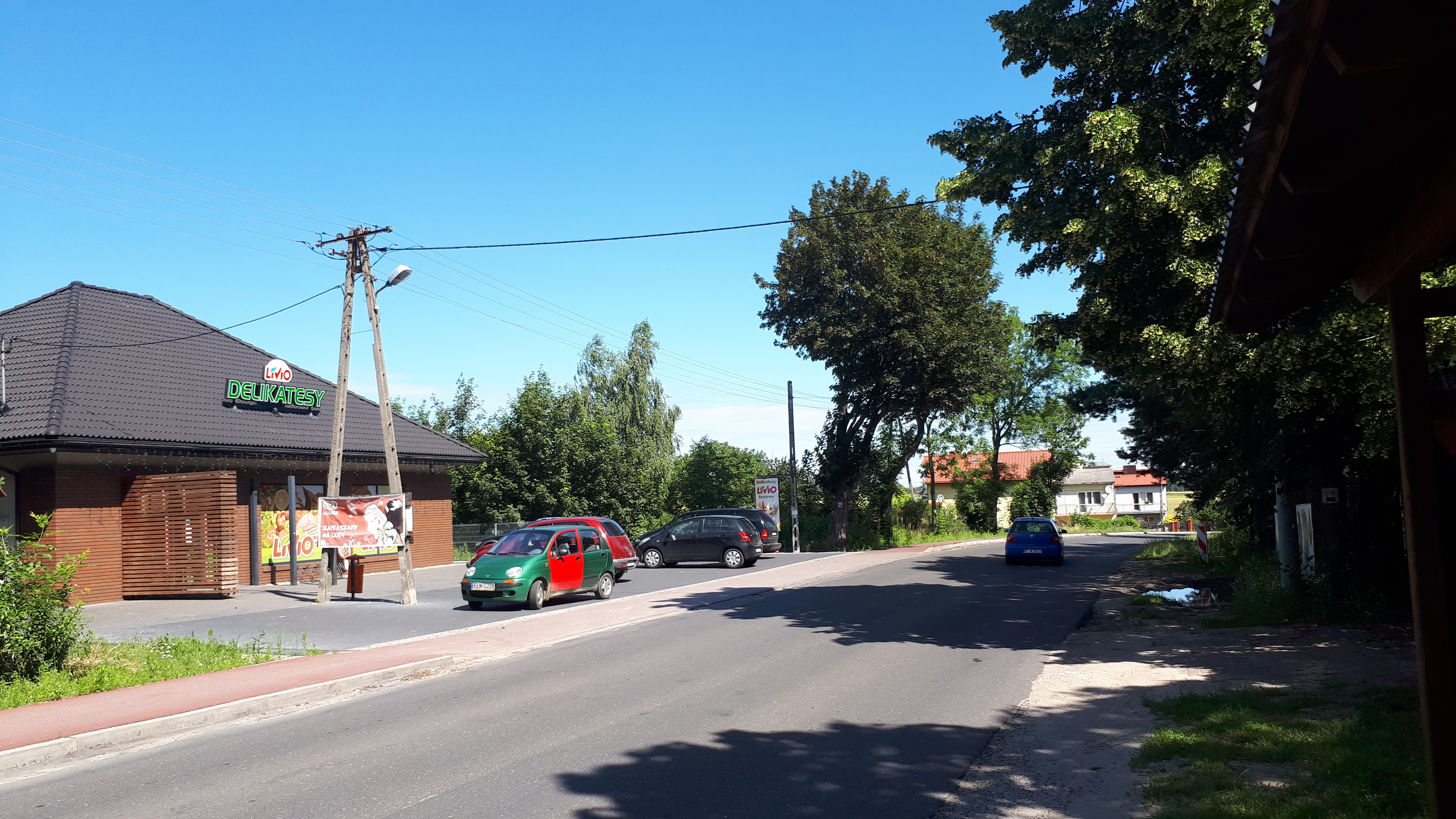

- Location within Poland
- Coordinates: 51°50′N 19°38′E
- Country: Poland
- Voivodeship: Łódź
- County: Łódź East
- Gmina: Nowosolna
- Highest elevation: 204 m (669 ft)
- Lowest elevation: 190 m (620 ft)
- Population: 250

Byszewy [bɨˈʂɛvɨ] is a village in the administrative district of Gmina Nowosolna, within Łódź East County, Łódź Voivodeship, in central Poland.
