= Kobylany, Radom County =

Kobylany
- Village
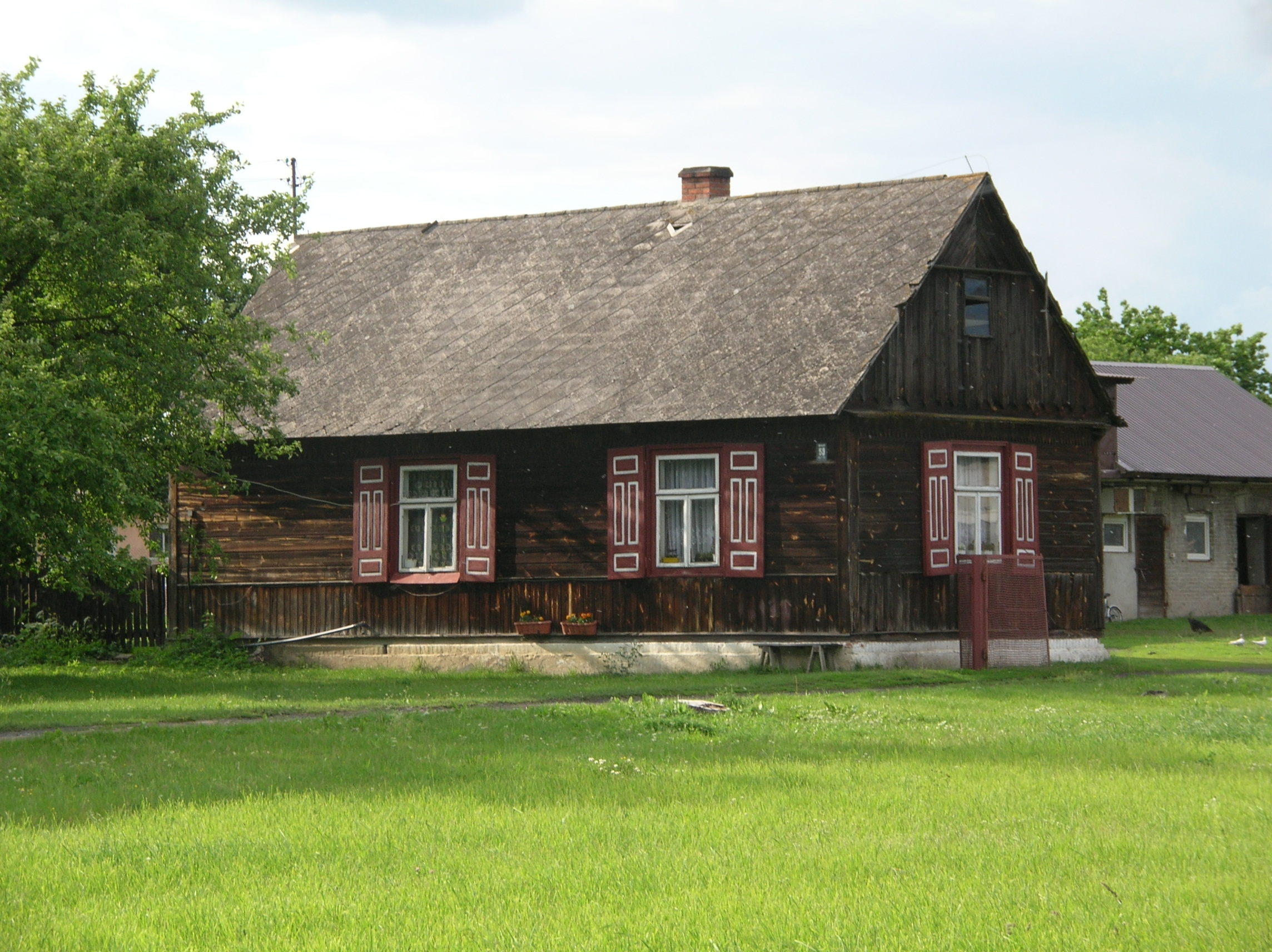
- Cottage in Kobylany

- Location within Poland
- Coordinates: 51°19′N 21°18′E
- Country: Poland
- Voivodeship: Masovian
- County: Radom
- Gmina: Skaryszew

Kobylany [kɔbɨˈlanɨ] is a village in the administrative district of Gmina Skaryszew, within Radom County, Masovian Voivodeship, in east-central Poland.
