= Tomaszów, Radom County =

Tomaszów
- Village
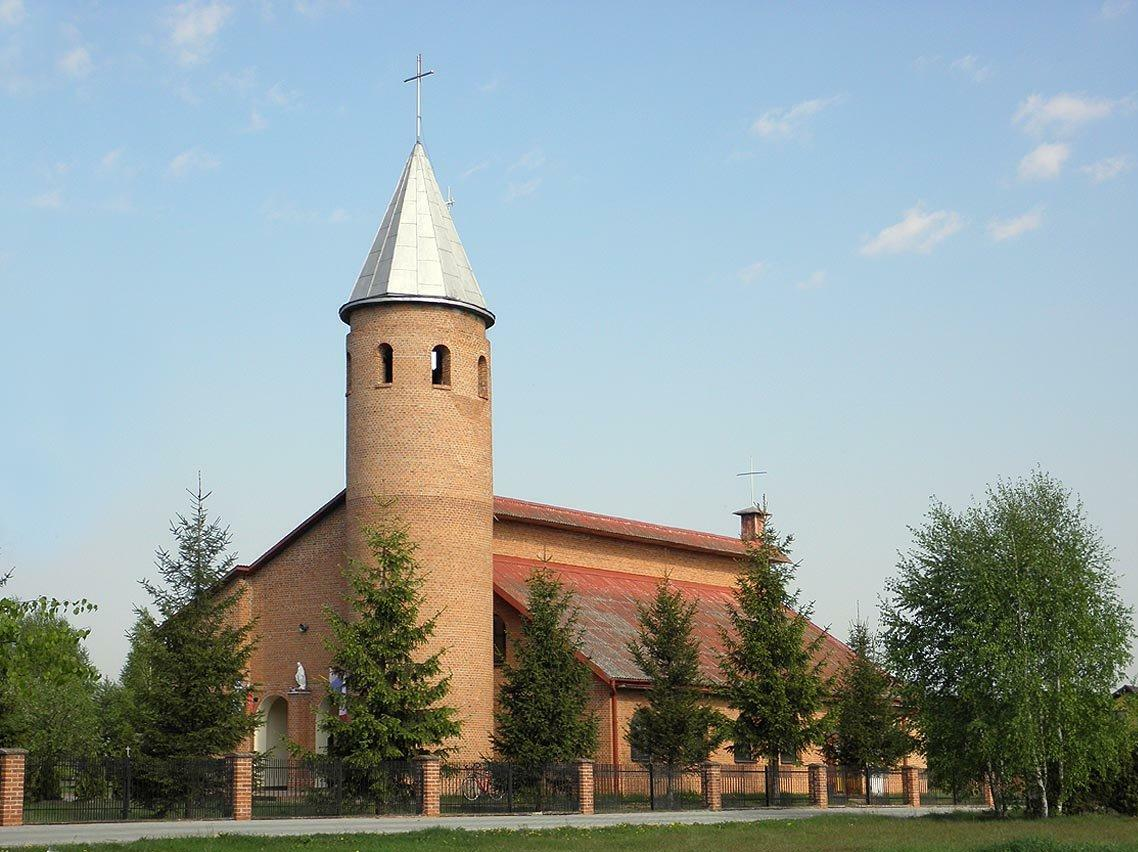

- Location within Poland
- Coordinates: 51°14′46″N 21°19′33″E
- Country: Poland
- Voivodeship: Masovian
- County: Radom
- Gmina: Skaryszew

Tomaszów [tɔˈmaʂuf] is a village in the administrative district of Gmina Skaryszew, within Radom County, Masovian Voivodeship, in east-central Poland.
