= Głogowiec, Łódź East County =

Głogowiec
- Village
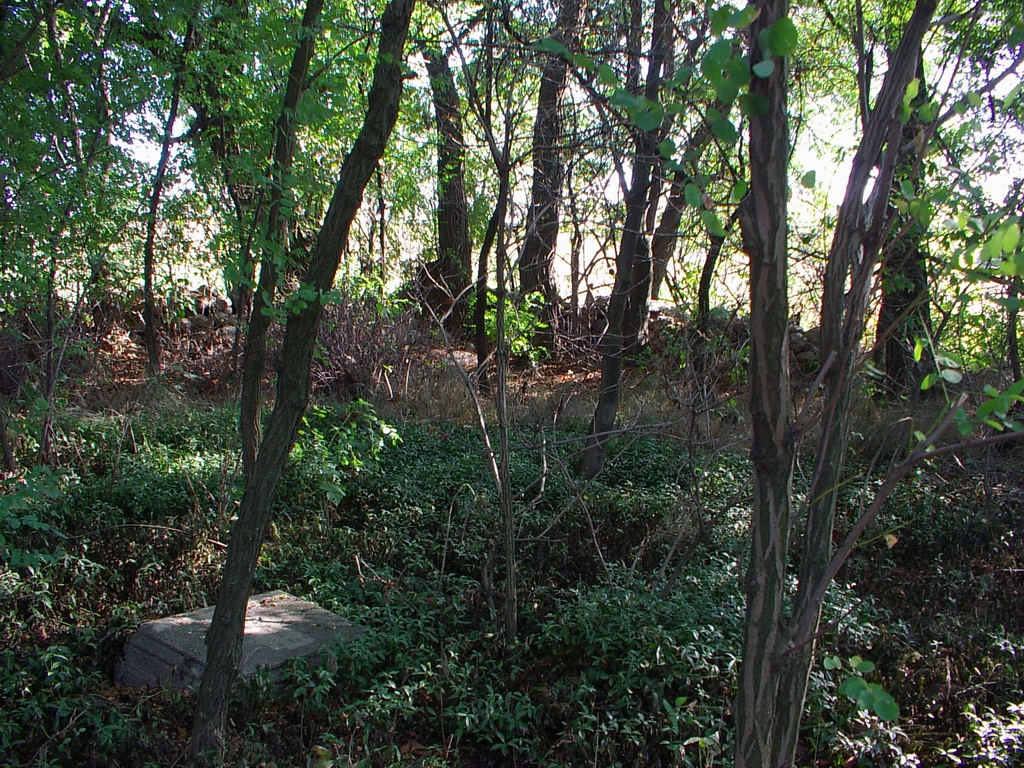
- Evangelical cemetery in Głogowiec

- Location within Poland
- Coordinates: 51°50′07″N 19°39′05″E
- Country: Poland
- Voivodeship: Łódź
- County: Łódź East
- Gmina: Nowosolna
- Highest elevation: 220 m (720 ft)
- Lowest elevation: 200 m (660 ft)
- Population (approx.): 40

Głogowiec [ɡwɔˈɡɔvjɛt͡s] is a village in the administrative district of Gmina Nowosolna, within Łódź East County, Łódź Voivodeship, in central Poland.

The village has an approximate population of 40.
