= Gębarzów-Kolonia =

Village in Gmina Skaryszew, Poland

- Village
- Location within Poland
- Coordinates: 51°19′19″N 21°10′44″E
- Country: Poland
- Voivodeship: Masovian
- County: Radom
- Gmina: Skaryszew

Gębarzów-Kolonia [ɡɛmˈbaʐuf kɔˈlɔɲa] is a village in the administrative district of Gmina Skaryszew, within Radom County, Masovian Voivodeship, in east-central Poland.
