= Gmina Skaryszew =

Gmina Skaryszew Skaryszew Commune
- Gmina
- Coat of arms
- Interactive map of Gmina Skaryszew
- Coordinates (Skaryszew): 51°18′32″N 21°14′55″E
- Country: Poland
- Voivodeship: Masovian
- County: Radom County
- Seat: Skaryszew

Area
  - Total: 171.41 km^{2} (66.18 sq mi)

Population (2006)
  - Total: 13,356
  - Density: 77.918/km^{2} (201.81/sq mi)
  - Urban: 3,989
  - Rural: 9,367
- Website: http://www.skaryszew.pl

Gmina Skaryszew is an urban-rural gmina (administrative district) in Radom County, Masovian Voivodeship, in east-central Poland. Its seat is the town of Skaryszew, which lies approximately 12 kilometres (7 mi) south-east of Radom and 103 km (64 mi) south of Warsaw.

The gmina covers an area of 171.41 square kilometres (66.2 sq mi), and as of 2006 its total population is 13,356 (out of which the population of Skaryszew amounts to 3,989, and the population of the rural part of the gmina is 9,367).

== Villages ==
Apart from the town of Skaryszew, Gmina Skaryszew contains the villages and settlements of Anielin, Antoniów, Bogusławice, Bujak, Chomętów-Puszcz, Chomętów-Socha, Chomętów-Szczygieł, Edwardów, Gębarzów, Gębarzów-Kolonia, Grabina, Huta Skaryszewska, Janów, Kazimierówka, Kłonowiec-Koracz, Kłonowiec-Kurek, Kobylany, Maków, Maków Nowy, Makowiec, Miasteczko, Modrzejowice, Niwa Odechowska, Nowy Dzierzkówek, Odechów, Odechowiec, Podsuliszka, Sołtyków, Stary Dzierzkówek, Tomaszów, Wilczna, Wólka Twarogowa, Wymysłów and Zalesie.

== Neighbouring gminas ==
Gmina Skaryszew is bordered by the city of Radom and by the gminas of Gózd, Iłża, Kazanów, Kowala, Tczów and Wierzbica.
