= Huta Skaryszewska =

- Village
- Location within Poland
- Coordinates: 51°17′N 21°18′E
- Country: Poland
- Voivodeship: Masovian
- County: Radom
- Gmina: Skaryszew

Huta Skaryszewska [ˈxuta skarɨˈʂɛfska] is a village in the administrative district of Gmina Skaryszew, within Radom County, Masovian Voivodeship, in east-central Poland.
