= Janów, Łódź East County =

Janów
- Village
- Location within Poland
- Coordinates: 51°48′58″N 19°36′41″E
- Country: Poland
- Voivodeship: Łódź
- County: Łódź East
- Gmina: Nowosolna

Janów [ˈjanuf] is a village in the administrative district of Gmina Nowosolna, within Łódź East County, Łódź Voivodeship, in central Poland.
