= Bogusławice, Radom County =

Bogusławice
- Village
- Location within Poland
- Coordinates: 51°20′42″N 21°17′28″E
- Country: Poland
- Voivodeship: Masovian
- County: Radom
- Gmina: Skaryszew

Bogusławice [bɔɡuswaˈvit͡sɛ] is a village in the administrative district of Gmina Skaryszew, within Radom County, Masovian Voivodeship, in east-central Poland.
