= Edwardów, Radom County =

Edwardów
- Village
- Location within Poland
- Coordinates: 51°18′N 21°19′E
- Country: Poland
- Voivodeship: Masovian
- County: Radom
- Gmina: Skaryszew
- Time zone: UTC+1 (CET)
  - Summer (DST): UTC+2 (CEST)

Edwardów [ɛdˈvarduf] is a village in the administrative district of Gmina Skaryszew, within Radom County, Masovian Voivodeship, in east-central Poland.

Six Polish citizens were murdered by Nazi Germany in the village during World War II.
