= Dąbrówka, Łódź East County =

Dąbrówka
- Village
- Location within Poland
- Coordinates: 51°50′00″N 19°33′45″E
- Country: Poland
- Voivodeship: Łódź
- County: Łódź East
- Gmina: Nowosolna

Dąbrówka [dɔmˈbrufka] is a village in the administrative district of Gmina Nowosolna, within Łódź East County, Łódź Voivodeship, in central Poland.
