= Plichtów =

- Village
- Location within Poland
- Coordinates: 51°49′N 19°38′E
- Country: Poland
- Voivodeship: Łódź
- County: Łódź East
- Gmina: Nowosolna

Plichtów [ˈplixtuf] is a village in the administrative district of Gmina Nowosolna, within Łódź East County, Łódź Voivodeship, in central Poland.
