= Anielin, Radom County =

Anielin
- Village
- Location within Poland
- Coordinates: 51°15′N 21°19′E
- Country: Poland
- Voivodeship: Masovian
- County: Radom
- Gmina: Skaryszew

Anielin [aˈɲɛlin] is a village in the administrative district of Gmina Skaryszew, within Radom County, Masovian Voivodeship, in east-central Poland.
