= Borki, Łódź East County =

Borki
- Village
- Location within Poland
- Coordinates: 51°50′15″N 19°34′14″E
- Country: Poland
- Voivodeship: Łódź
- County: Łódź East
- Gmina: Nowosolna

Borki [ˈbɔrki] is a village in the administrative district of Gmina Nowosolna, within Łódź East County, Łódź Voivodeship, in central Poland.
