= Borchówka =

- Village
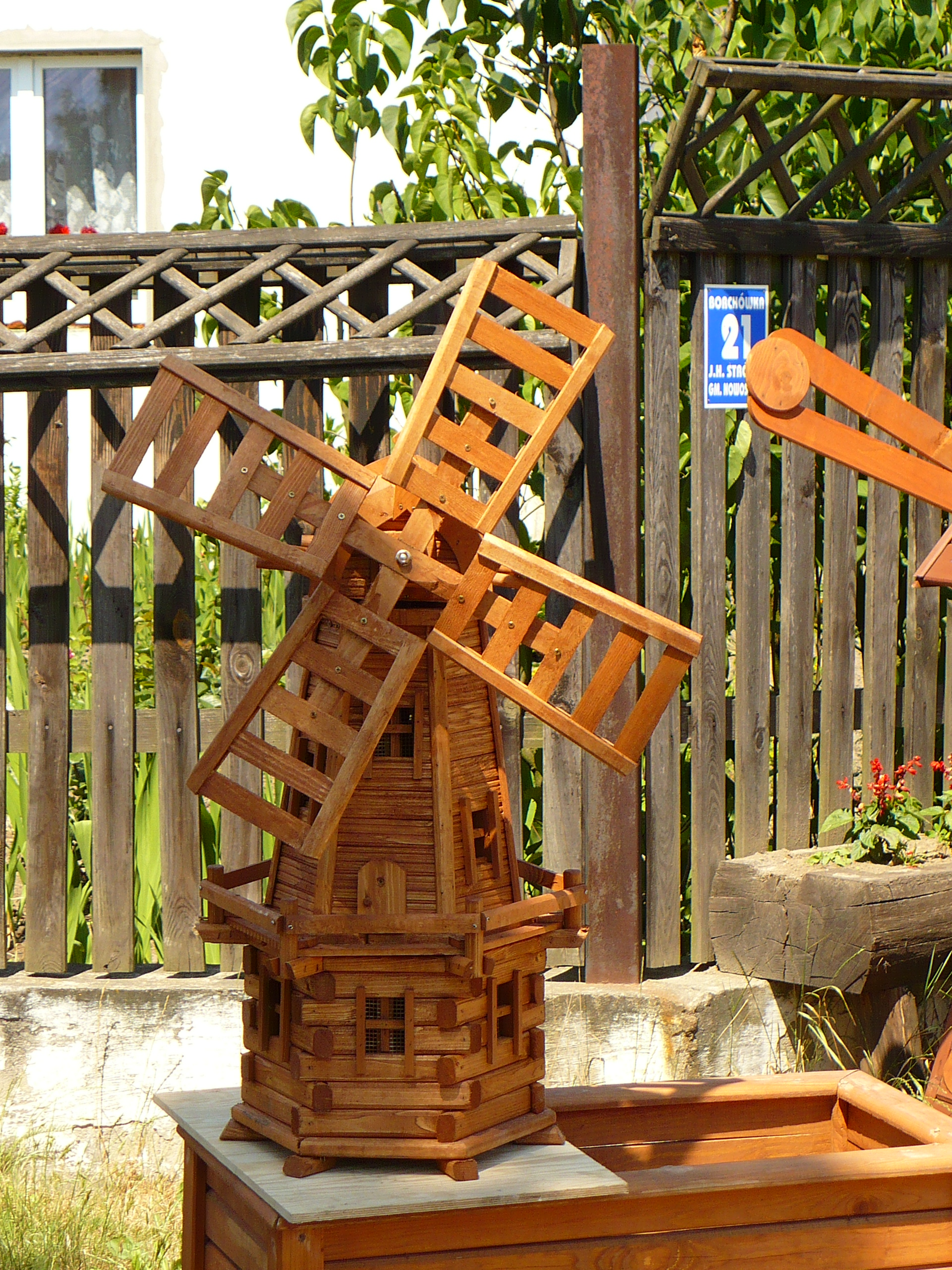

- Location within Poland
- Coordinates: 51°50′01″N 19°36′00″E
- Country: Poland
- Voivodeship: Łódź
- County: Łódź East
- Gmina: Nowosolna

Borchówka [bɔrˈxufka] is a village in the administrative district of Gmina Nowosolna, within Łódź East County, Łódź Voivodeship, in central Poland.
