= Janów, Radom County =

Janów
- Village
- Location within Poland
- Coordinates: 51°22′49″N 21°13′47″E
- Country: Poland
- Voivodeship: Masovian
- County: Radom
- Gmina: Skaryszew

Janów [ˈjanuf] is a village in the administrative district of Gmina Skaryszew, within Radom County, Masovian Voivodeship, in east-central Poland.
