= Makowiec, Masovian Voivodeship =

Makowiec
- Village
- Location within Poland
- Coordinates: 51°22′N 21°14′E
- Country: Poland
- Voivodeship: Masovian
- County: Radom
- Gmina: Skaryszew
- Population: 900

Makowiec [maˈkɔvjɛt͡s] is a village in the administrative district of Gmina Skaryszew, within Radom County, Masovian Voivodeship, in east-central Poland.
