= Dąbrowa, Łódź East County =

Dąbrowa
- Village
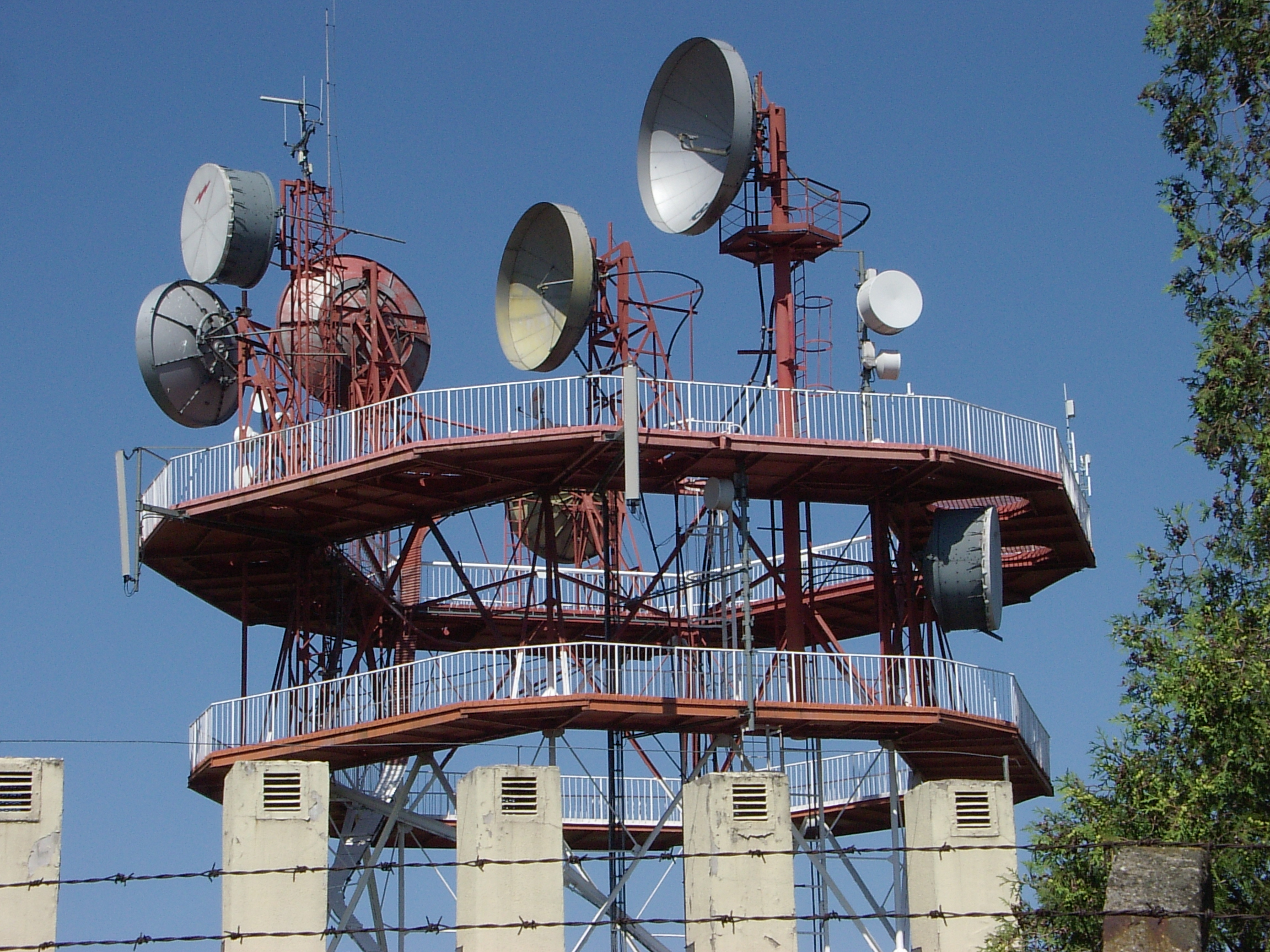
- Radary Hill

- Location within Poland
- Coordinates: 51°48′58″N 19°34′09″E
- Country: Poland
- Voivodeship: Łódź
- County: Łódź East
- Gmina: Nowosolna

Dąbrowa [dɔmˈbrɔva] is a village in the administrative district of Gmina Nowosolna, within Łódź East County, Łódź Voivodeship, in central Poland.
