= Wiączyń Dolny =

- Village
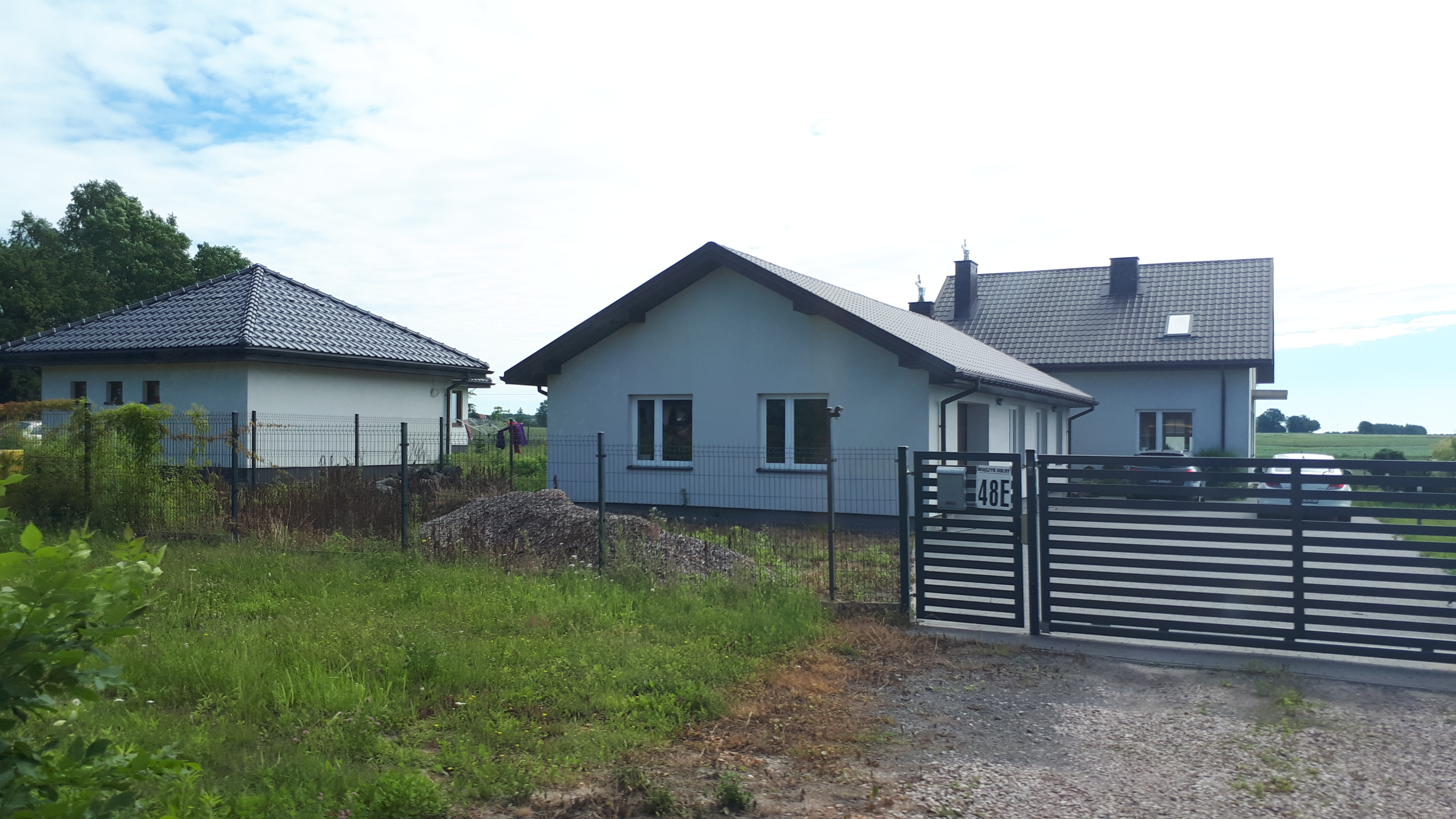

- Location within Poland
- Coordinates: 51°46′41″N 19°36′36″E
- Country: Poland
- Voivodeship: Łódź
- County: Łódź East
- Gmina: Nowosolna
- Population: 4

Wiączyń Dolny [ˈvjɔnt͡ʂɨɲ ˈdɔlnɨ] is a village in the administrative district of Gmina Nowosolna, within Łódź East County, Łódź Voivodeship, in central Poland.
