= Kazimierówka, Masovian Voivodeship =

Kazimierówka
- Village
- Location within Poland
- Coordinates: 51°20′04″N 21°17′41″E
- Country: Poland
- Voivodeship: Masovian
- County: Radom
- Gmina: Skaryszew

Kazimierówka (Polish: [kaʑimjɛˈrufka]) is a village in the administrative district of Gmina Skaryszew, within Radom County, Masovian Voivodeship, in east-central Poland.
