= Teolin, Łódź Voivodeship =

Teolin
- Village
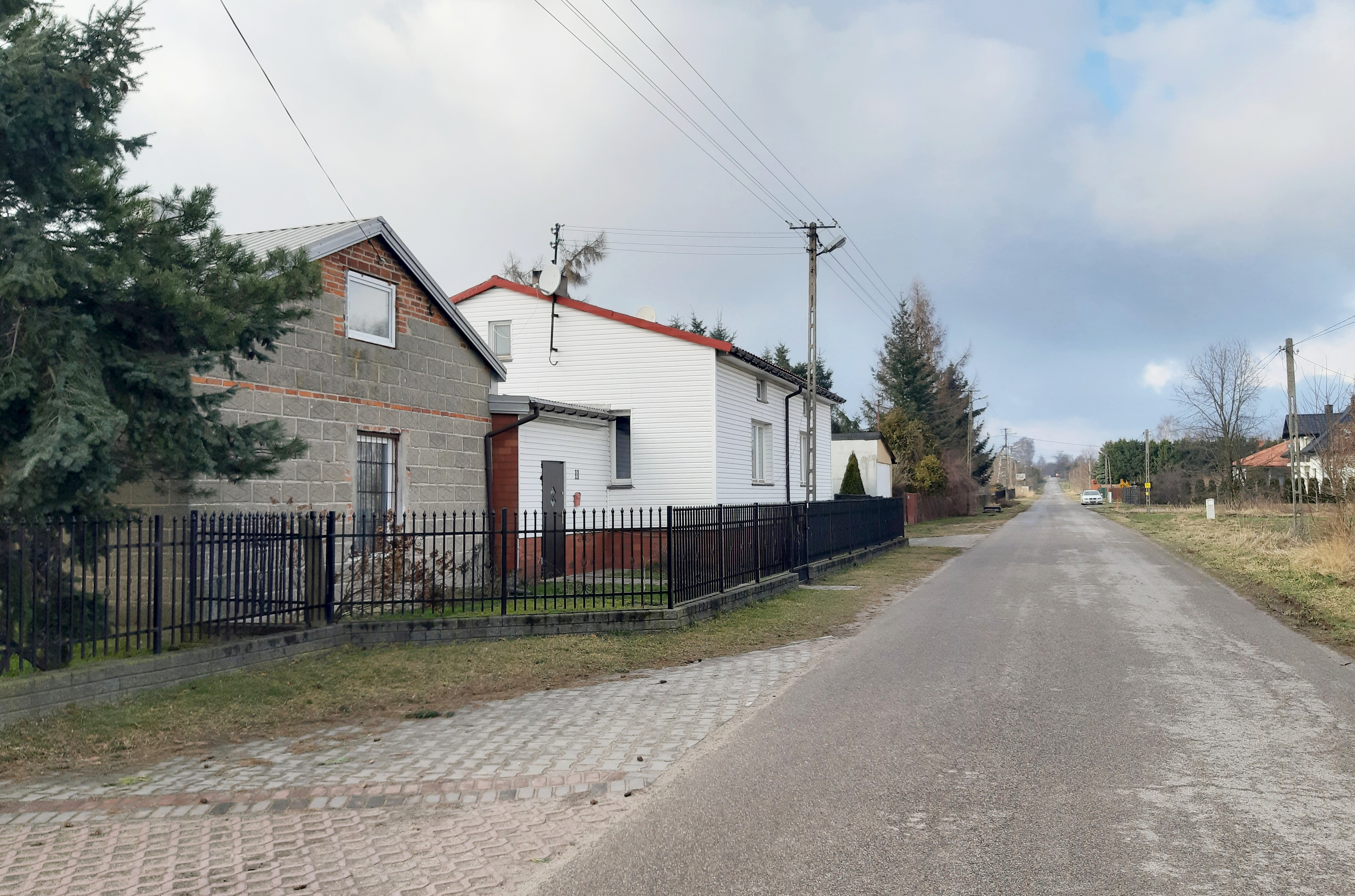

- Location within Poland
- Coordinates: 51°48′N 19°38′E
- Country: Poland
- Voivodeship: Łódź
- County: Łódź East
- Gmina: Nowosolna
- Population: 70

Teolin [tɛˈɔlin] is a village in the administrative district of Gmina Nowosolna, within Łódź East County, Łódź Voivodeship, in central Poland.
