= Nowe Skoszewy =

- Village
- Location within Poland
- Coordinates: 51°50′46″N 19°39′09″E
- Country: Poland
- Voivodeship: Łódź
- County: Łódź East
- Gmina: Nowosolna

Nowe Skoszewy [ˈnɔvɛ skɔˈʂɛvɨ] is a village in the administrative district of Gmina Nowosolna, within Łódź East County, Łódź Voivodeship, in central Poland.
