= Nowy Dzierzkówek =

Village in Gmina Skaryszew, Poland

- Village
- Location within Poland
- Coordinates: 51°15′36″N 21°17′38″E
- Country: Poland
- Voivodeship: Masovian
- County: Radom
- Gmina: Skaryszew

Nowy Dzierzkówek [ˈnɔvɨ d͡ʑɛʂˈkuvɛk] is a village in the administrative district of Gmina Skaryszew, within Radom County, Masovian Voivodeship, in east-central Poland.
