= Chomętów-Puszcz =

- Village
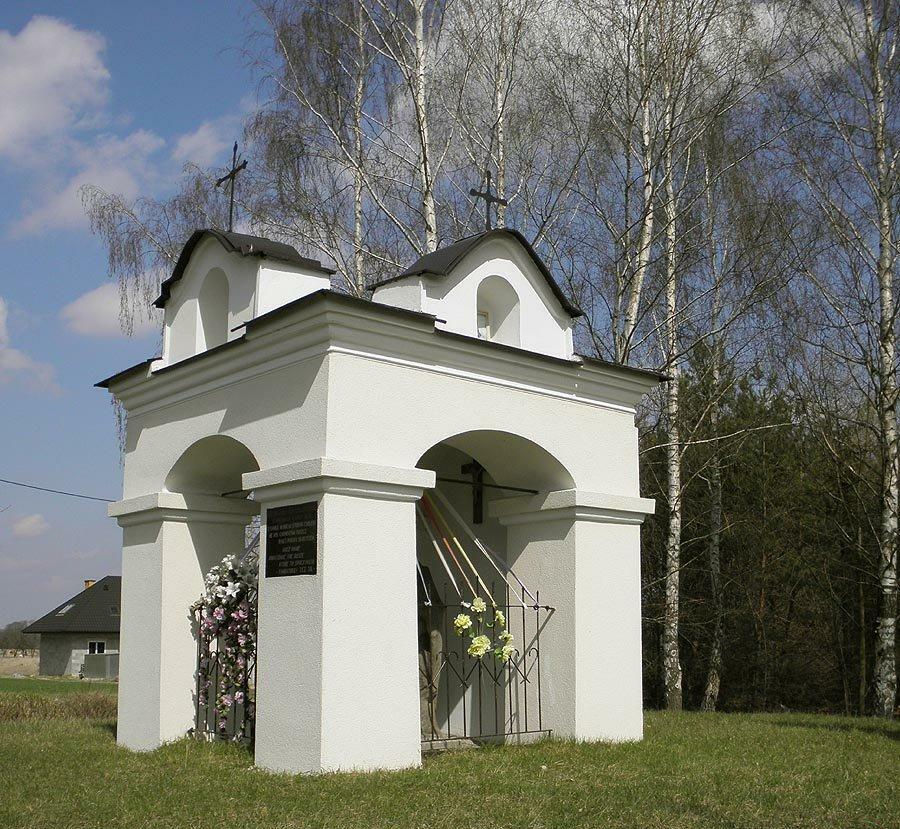

- Location within Poland
- Coordinates: 51°17′04″N 21°11′09″E
- Country: Poland
- Voivodeship: Masovian
- County: Radom
- Gmina: Skaryszew

Chomętów-Puszcz [xɔˈmɛntuf ˈpuʂt͡ʂ] is a village in the administrative district of Gmina Skaryszew, within Radom County, Masovian Voivodeship, in east-central Poland.
