= Zalesie, Gmina Skaryszew =

Zalesie
- Village
- Location within Poland
- Coordinates: 51°14′57″N 21°16′36″E
- Country: Poland
- Voivodeship: Masovian
- County: Radom
- Gmina: Skaryszew

Zalesie [zaˈlɛɕɛ] is a village in the administrative district of Gmina Skaryszew, within Radom County, Masovian Voivodeship, in east-central Poland.
