= Antoniów, Radom County =

Antoniów
- Village
- Location within Poland
- Coordinates: 51°16′N 21°14′E
- Country: Poland
- Voivodeship: Masovian
- County: Radom
- Gmina: Skaryszew

Antoniów [anˈtɔɲuf] is a village in the administrative district of Gmina Skaryszew, within Radom County, Masovian Voivodeship, in east-central Poland.
