= Kopanka, Łódź Voivodeship =

Kopanka
- Village
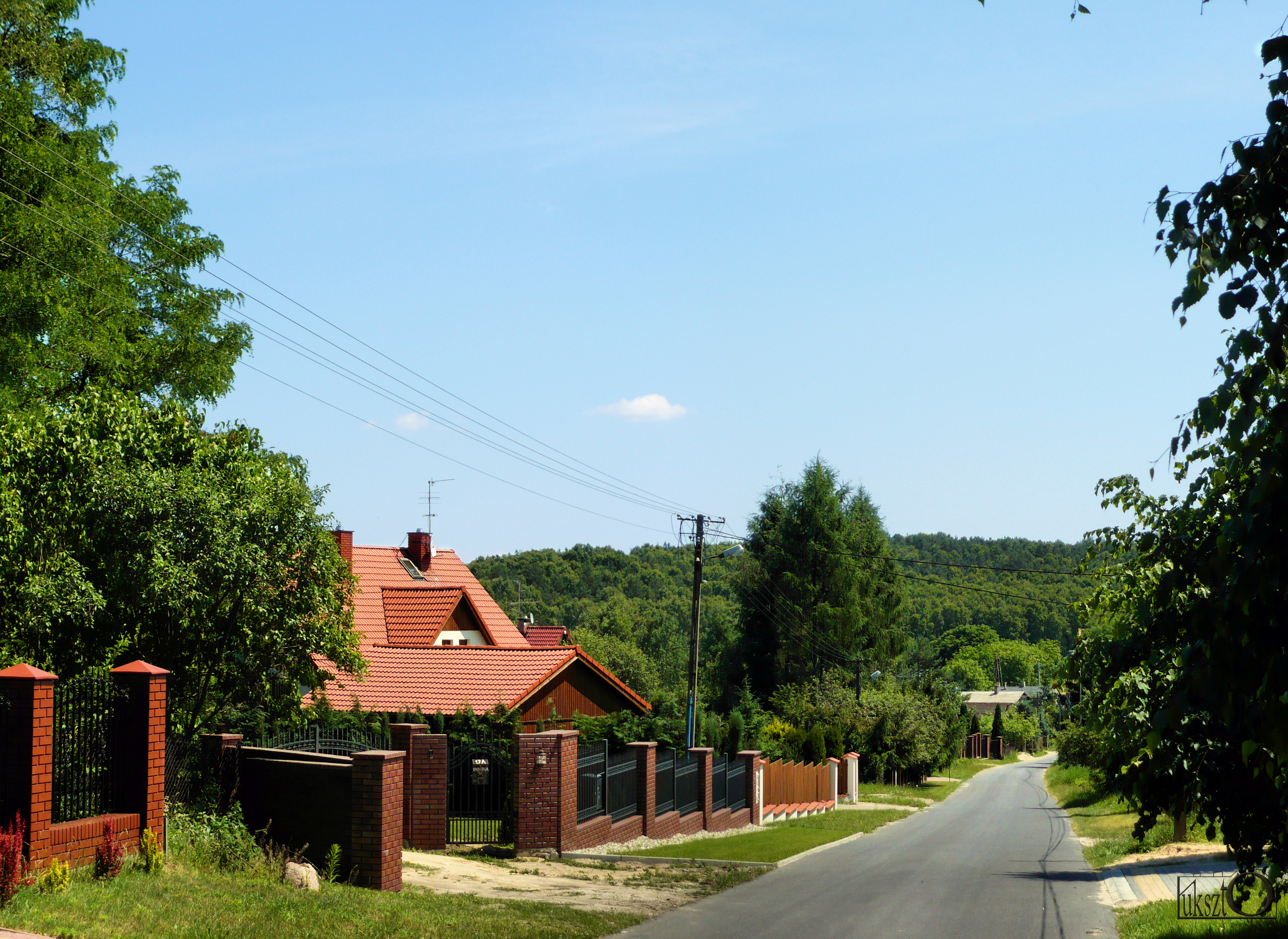
- Overlooking the hills of Kopanka-Dąbrowa

- Location within Poland
- Coordinates: 51°49′17″N 19°33′47″E
- Country: Poland
- Voivodeship: Łódź
- County: Łódź East
- Gmina: Nowosolna

Kopanka [kɔˈpanka] is a village in the administrative district of Gmina Nowosolna, located within Łódź East County, Łódź Voivodeship, in central Poland.
