= Wymysłów, Gmina Skaryszew =

Wymysłów
- Village
- Location within Poland
- Coordinates: 51°19′37″N 21°16′44″E
- Country: Poland
- Voivodeship: Masovian
- County: Radom
- Gmina: Skaryszew

Wymysłów [vɨˈmɨswuf] is a village in the administrative district of Gmina Skaryszew, within Radom County, Masovian Voivodeship, in east-central Poland.
