= Stare Skoszewy =

- Village
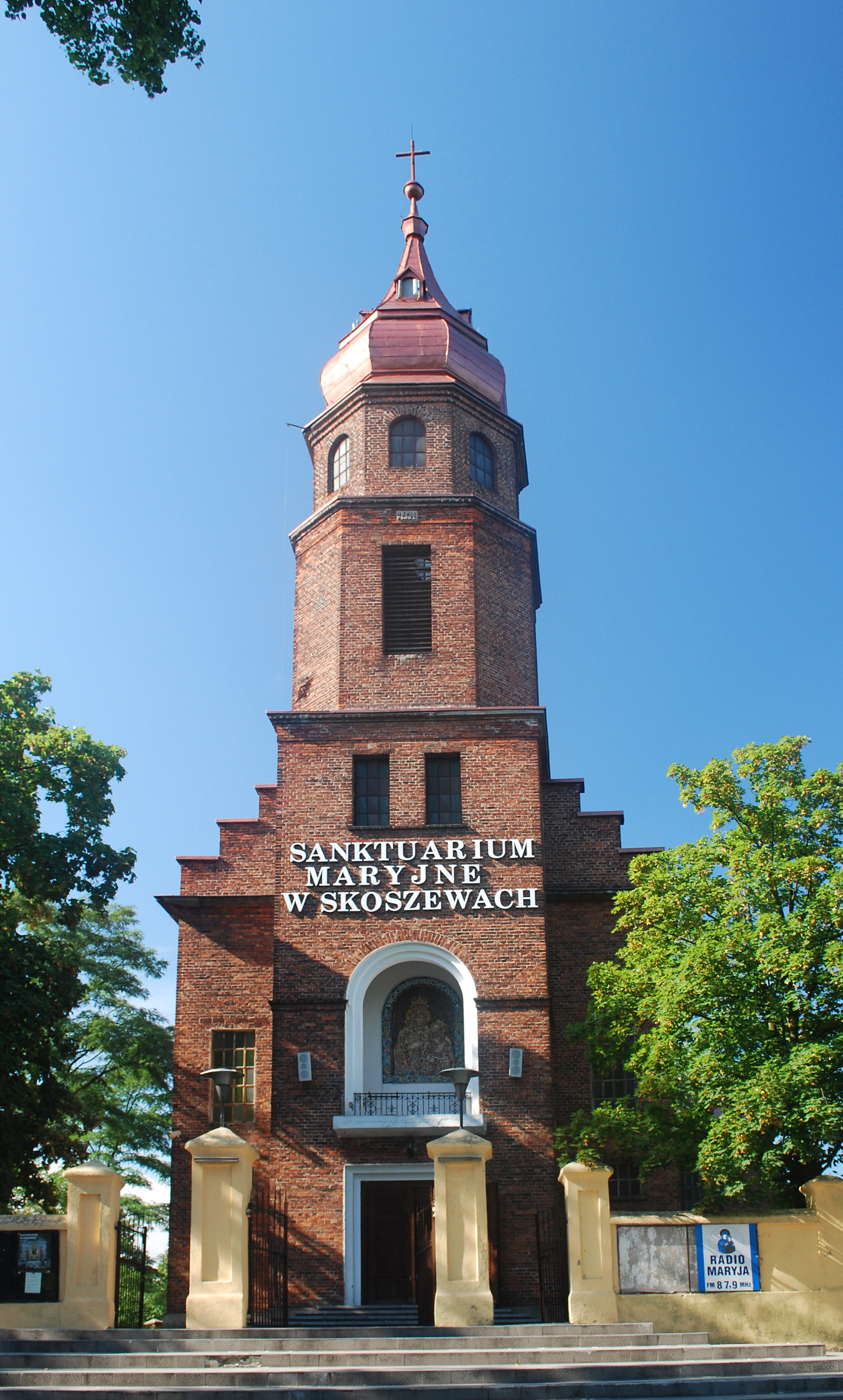
- Sanctuary in Stare Skoszewy

- Location within Poland
- Coordinates: 51°50′59″N 19°37′47″E
- Country: Poland
- Voivodeship: Łódź
- County: Łódź East
- Gmina: Nowosolna

Population (approx.)
  - Total: 180
- Time zone: UTC+1 (CET)
  - Summer (DST): UTC+2 (CEST)
- Vehicle registration: ELW

Stare Skoszewy [ˈstarɛ skɔˈʂɛvɨ] is a village in the administrative district of Gmina Nowosolna, within Łódź East County, Łódź Voivodeship, in central Poland. It is located in Łęczyca Land.

Skoszewy was a private town, administratively located in the Brzeziny County in the Łęczyca Voivodeship in the Greater Poland Province of the Kingdom of Poland.
