= Wilczna, Masovian Voivodeship =

Wilczna
- Village
- Location within Poland
- Coordinates: 51°17′N 21°12′E
- Country: Poland
- Voivodeship: Masovian
- County: Radom
- Gmina: Skaryszew
- Population (approx.): 140

Wilczna [ˈvilt͡ʂna] is a village in the administrative district of Gmina Skaryszew, within Radom County, Masovian Voivodeship, in east-central Poland.
