= Chomętów-Szczygieł =

Chomentów-Szczygieł
- Village
- Location within Poland
- Coordinates: 51°16′54″N 21°09′58″E
- Country: Poland
- Voivodeship: Masovian
- County: Radom
- Gmina: Skaryszew

Chomentów-Szczygieł [xɔˈmɛntuf ˈʂt͡ʂɨɡʲɛu̯] is a village in the administrative district of Gmina Skaryszew, within Radom County, Masovian Voivodeship, in east-central Poland.
