= Chomętów-Socha =

Village in Gmina Skaryszew, Poland

Chomentów-Socha
- Village
- Location within Poland
- Coordinates: 51°17′36″N 21°10′48″E
- Country: Poland
- Voivodeship: Masovian
- County: Radom
- Gmina: Skaryszew

Chomentów-Socha [xɔˈmɛntuf ˈsɔxa] is a village in the administrative district of Gmina Skaryszew, within Radom County, Masovian Voivodeship, in east-central Poland.
