= Gmina Nowosolna =

Gmina Nowosolna Nowosolna Commune
- Gmina

- Flag Coat of arms
- Interactive map of Gmina Nowosolna
- Coordinates: 51°48′35″N 19°38′28″E
- Country: Poland
- Voivodeship: Łódź
- County: Łódź East County
- Seat: Nowosolna

Area
  - Total: 53.98 km^{2} (20.84 sq mi)

Population (2006)
  - Total: 3,788
  - Density: 70.17/km^{2} (181.8/sq mi)
- Website: www.nowosolna.gminarp.pl

Gmina Nowosolna is a rural gmina (administrative district) in Łódź East County, Łódź Voivodeship, in central Poland. It has its seat in the former village of Nowosolna, although this is now part of the Widzew district of Łódź, and is therefore not part of the territory of the gmina.

The gmina covers an area of 53.98 square kilometres (20.8 sq mi), and as of 2006 its total population is 3,788.

The gmina contains part of the protected area called Łódź Hills Landscape Park.

== Villages ==
Gmina Nowosolna contains the villages and settlements of:

- Boginia
- Borchówka
- Borki
- Byszewy
- Dąbrowa
- Dąbrówka
- Głogowiec
- Grabina
- Janów
- Kalonka
- Kopanka
- Ksawerów
- Lipiny
- Moskwa
- Natolin
- Niecki
- Nowe Skoszewy
- Plichtów
- Stare Skoszewy
- Teolin
- Wiączyń Dolny
- Wódka

== Neighbouring gminas ==
Gmina Nowosolna is bordered by the city of Łódź and by the gminas of Andrespol, Brzeziny and Stryków.
