= Natolin, Łódź Voivodeship =

Natolin
- Village
- Location within Poland
- Coordinates: 51°48′N 19°38′E
- Country: Poland
- Voivodeship: Łódź
- County: Łódź East
- Gmina: Nowosolna

Natolin [naˈtɔlin] is a village in the administrative district of Gmina Nowosolna, within Łódź East County, Łódź Voivodeship, in central Poland.
