= Maków, Masovian Voivodeship =

Maków
- Village
- Location within Poland
- Coordinates: 51°20′43″N 21°15′11″E
- Country: Poland
- Voivodeship: Masovian
- County: Radom
- Gmina: Skaryszew
- Population: 890

Maków [ˈmakuf] is a village in the administrative district of Gmina Skaryszew, within Radom County, Masovian Voivodeship, in east-central Poland.

Maków was located in the second half of the 16th century in Radom County of Sandomierskie Voivodeship. Between 1975 and 1998, the village administratively belonged to Radom Province. In the village there is a historic manor house from the 18th century (now a school).
