= Niecki, Łódź Voivodeship =

Niecki
- Village
- Location within Poland
- Coordinates: 51°49′59″N 19°35′15″E
- Country: Poland
- Voivodeship: Łódź
- County: Łódź East
- Gmina: Nowosolna

Niecki [ˈɲɛt͡ski] is a village in the administrative district of Gmina Nowosolna, within Łódź East County, Łódź Voivodeship, in central Poland.
