= Wódka, Łódź Voivodeship =

Wódka
- Village
- Location within Poland
- Coordinates: 51°49′35″N 19°33′21″E
- Country: Poland
- Voivodeship: Łódź
- County: Łódź East
- Gmina: Nowosolna
- Population: 50

Wódka [ˈvutka] is a village in the administrative district of Gmina Nowosolna, within Łódź East County, Łódź Voivodeship, in central Poland.
