= Beth Jacob V'Anshei Drildz =

Orthodox synagogue in Toronto, Ontario

Beth Jacob V’Anshei Drildz
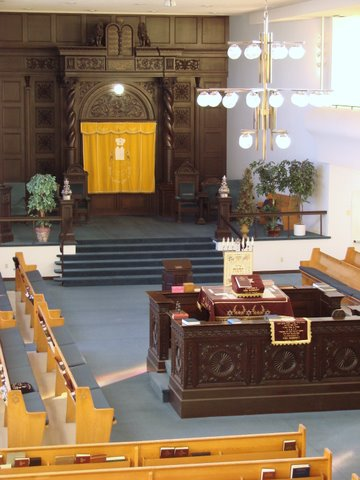
- Main sanctuary of Beth Jacob V'Anshei Drildz

Religion
- Affiliation: Orthodox Judaism
- Leadership: Rabbi Dov Schochet
- Status: Active

Location
- Location: 147 Overbrook Place; Toronto, Ontario; M3H 4R1
- Interactive map of Beth Jacob V’Anshei Drildz
- Coordinates: 43.7625°N 79.4574°W

Architecture
- Architect: Benjamin Brown (former Henry St. Location)
- Completed: 1957

Website
- www.bethjacobtoronto.org

Beth Jacob V’Anshei Drildz is an Orthodox synagogue in the North York district of Toronto, Ontario, Canada. Founded in 1897, Beth Jacob is one of the oldest continuously-run synagogues in Toronto. The synagogue follows the Nusach Sefard style of prayer.

== History ==
Beth Jacob was founded by Polish Jews in 1897, and was originally located in various rented sites throughout the early twentieth century. Famed Jewish architect Benjamin Brown was hired to design a permanent site on 23 and 23 ½ Henry St in 1919. The synagogue was able to fit 800 people and was dedicated in 1922. The synagogue was well-known for its stained glass windows.

In 1962, Beth Jacob moved to North York following the migration of Jews to Bathurst Manor. The aron kodesh and bimah were taken from the Henry Street location, which subsequently became a Russian Orthodox Church. The North York site of Beth Jacob was completed in 1969.

Beth Jacob amalgamated with Shaarei Emunah in 1966. In 1971, Linas Hatzedec Anshei Drildz (the "Drildzer synagogue"), founded by Jews from the Polish city of Iłża (Drildz, in Yiddish), amalgamated with Beth Jacob.

== Rabbis ==
- Rabbi Yehudah Yudel Rosenberg (1913–1919)
- Rabbi Yehuda Leib Graubart (1920?–?)
- Rabbi Samuel Silverstein
- Rabbi Benjamin Hauer (1951–1962)
- Rabbi Moses J. Burak (1962–1997)
- Rabbi Jay Kelman (1997–?)
- Rabbi Dov Yehudah Schochet (?–present)
