= Szaja Charnam =

Polish Jewish communist activist

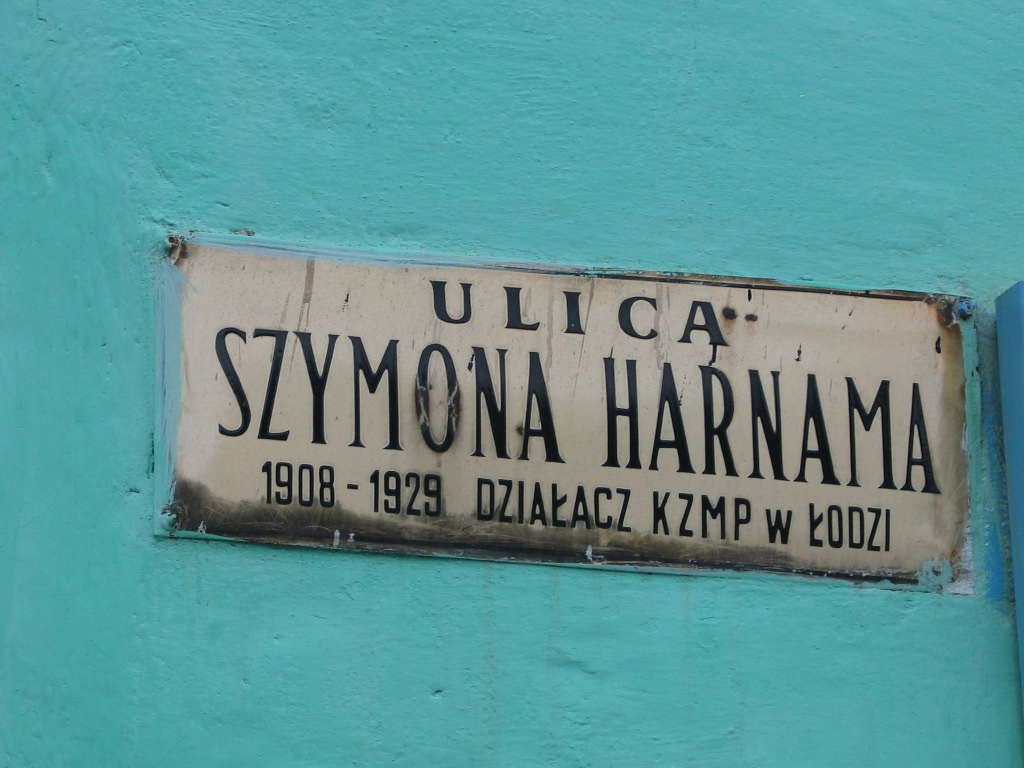
- The sign of the former Szymon Harnam Street in Łódź
- Born: 22 November 1908; Łódź, Piotrków Governorate, Vistula Land
- Died: 25 October 1929 (aged 20); Łódź, Łódź Voivodeship, Second Polish Republic
- Cause of death: Murdered
- Resting place: Doły Cemetery, Łódź
- Other name: Szymon Harnam
- Years active: 1926-1929
- Political party: ZMKwP
- Movement: Communism
- Criminal penalty: Imprisonment

Szaja Charnam (1908–1929), also known as Szymon Harnam or Szajek, was a Jewish-Polish communist activist in Łódź, Poland.

== Biography ==
Charnam was born on November 22, 1908. he joined the underground communist movement around 1926 or 1927. He became a leading figure of the Young Communist League of Poland (ZMKwP) in his hometown, and was known to be a fiery public speaker. He was a member of the Trade Union of Workers of the Textile Industry in Poland. As a 21-year old he had been arrested five times. His underground code name was 'Szajek'. On April 19, 1928 he was sentenced to two years imprisonment.

Charnam was released from prison in 1928 and resumed political and trade union activities. He was named vice-chairman of the youth section at the Trade Union of Workers of the Textile Industry and Related Professions in Łódź, established in 1929. On October 24, 1929 Charnam organized a rally at the gates of the Biderman textile mill, to commemorate the anniversary of the October Revolution. A plainclothes policeman sought to arrest him at the event, and Charnam was shot in the stomach during process. He died at a hospital the following day.

The Łódź branches of the Communist Party of Poland and the ZMKwP wanted organize a mass funeral procession for Charnam, but the authorities had organized an early burial to avoid that the funeral turn into a political protest. The communists organizations then organized a symbolic funeral procession with an empty coffin, which was dispersed by police and 18 people arrested.

== Legacy ==
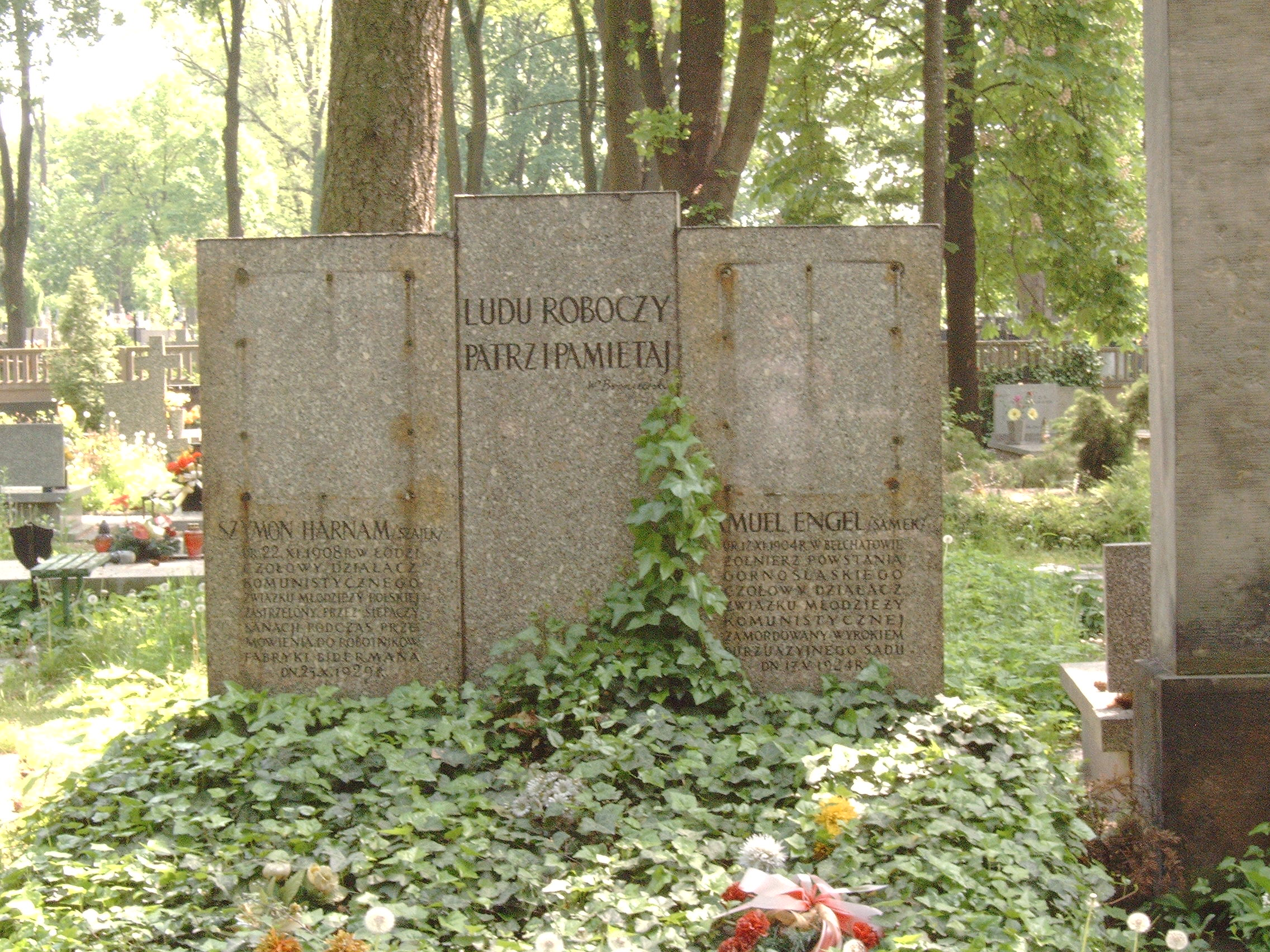
The graves of Szaja Charnam and Samuel Engel

Charnam would be elevated as a martyr in the Polish communist movement, and songs were written about him. In 1950 the Biderman textile mill was renamed as the 'Szaja Charnam Mill'. A street in the Bałuty district of Łódź was also named in his honour, but the thoroughfare was later renamed after a local industrialist as part of 'decommunisation' policies under the far-right PiS government. However, the Harnam Folk Dance Ensemble has retained its name.
