= Miasteczko, Masovian Voivodeship =

Miasteczko
- Village
- Location within Poland
- Coordinates: 51°17′N 21°20′E
- Country: Poland
- Voivodeship: Masovian
- County: Radom
- Gmina: Skaryszew

Miasteczko [mjasˈtɛt͡ʂkɔ] is a village in the administrative district of Gmina Skaryszew, within Radom County, Masovian Voivodeship, in east-central Poland. The word miasteczko is a diminutive of the Polish word miasto ("town"), and means "small town" or "village".
