= Lipiny, Łódź East County =

Lipiny
- Village
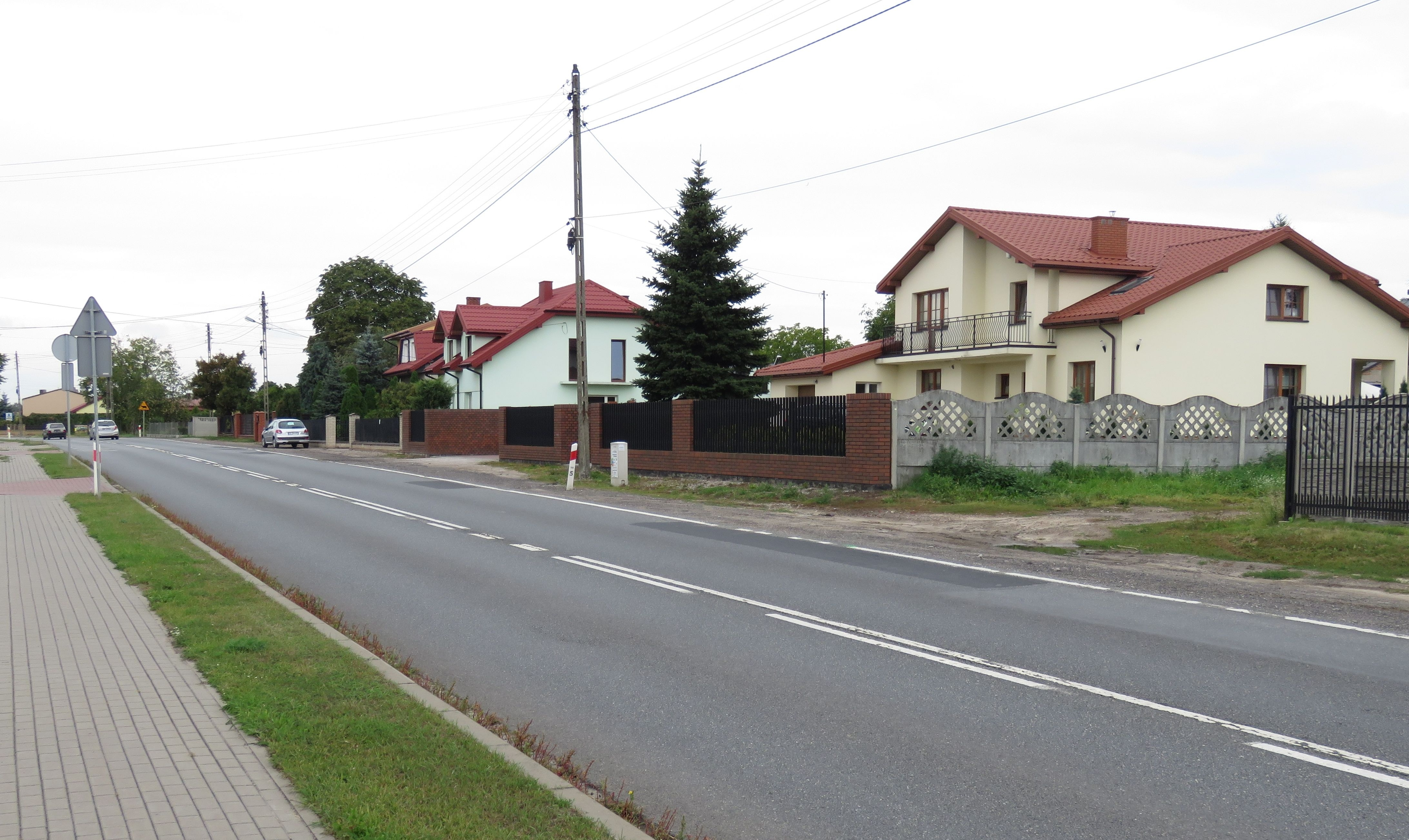

- Location within Poland
- Coordinates: 51°48′22″N 19°40′6″E
- Country: Poland
- Voivodeship: Łódź
- County: Łódź East
- Gmina: Nowosolna

Lipiny [liˈpinɨ] is a village in the administrative district of Gmina Nowosolna, within Łódź East County, Łódź Voivodeship, in central Poland.
