= Grabina, Gmina Skaryszew =

Grabina
- Village
- Location within Poland
- Coordinates: 51°18′48″N 21°18′20″E
- Country: Poland
- Voivodeship: Masovian
- County: Radom
- Gmina: Skaryszew

Grabina [ɡraˈbina] is a village in the administrative district of Gmina Skaryszew, within Radom County, Masovian Voivodeship, in east-central Poland.
