= Grabina, Łódź East County =

Grabina
- Village
- Location within Poland
- Coordinates: 51°50′N 19°36′E
- Country: Poland
- Voivodeship: Łódź
- County: Łódź East
- Gmina: Nowosolna

Grabina [ɡraˈbina] is a village in the administrative district of Gmina Nowosolna, within Łódź East County, Łódź Voivodeship, in central Poland.
