= Skaryszew =

Town in Poland

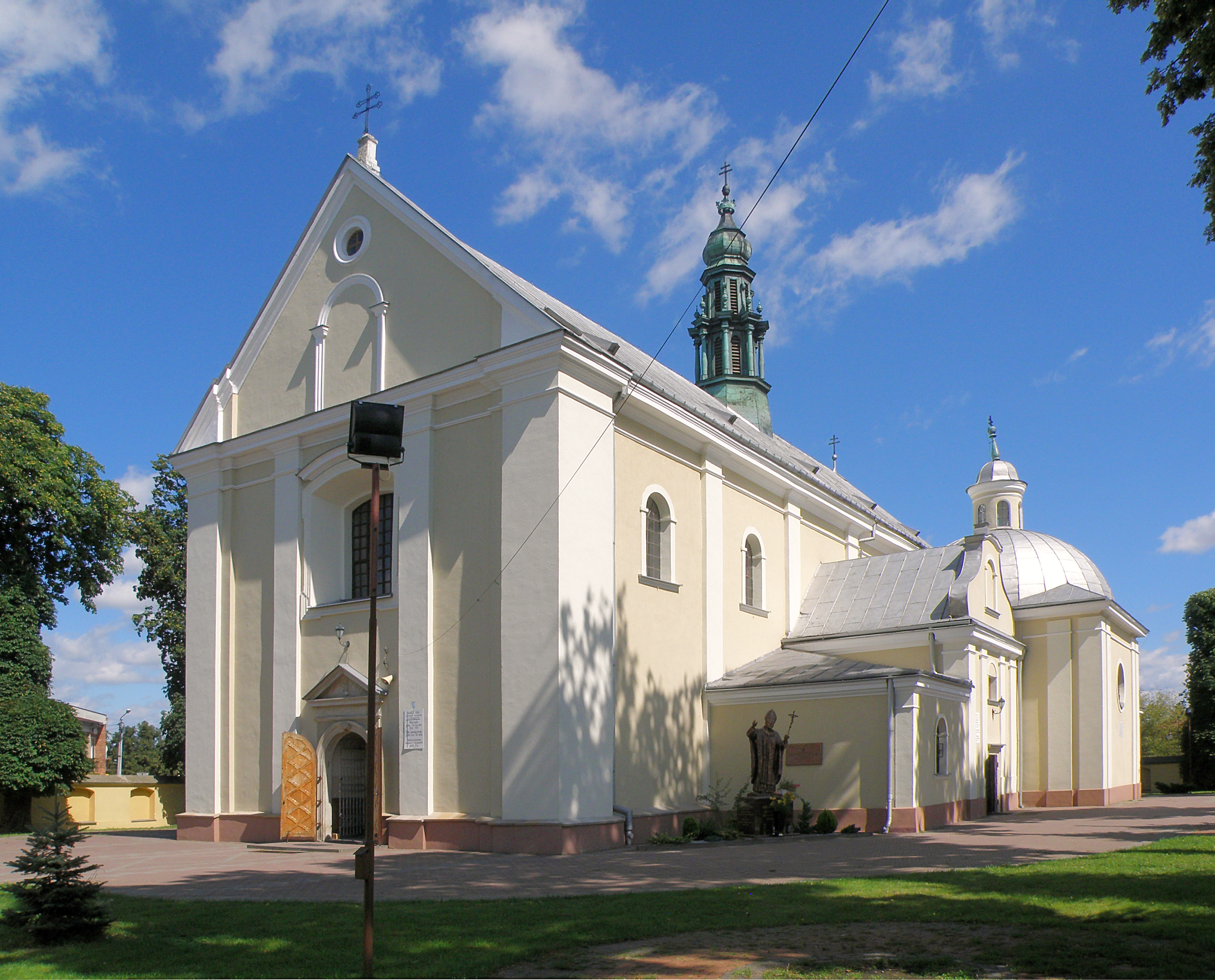
- Baroque Church of Saint James in Skaryszew

- Flag Coat of arms

- Location within Poland
- Coordinates: 51°18′32″N 21°14′55″E
- Country: Poland
- Voivodeship: Masovian
- County: Radom
- Gmina: Skaryszew
- First mentioned: 1198
- Town rights: 1264

Government
  - Mayor: Justyna Grys

Area
  - Total: 27.49 km^{2} (10.61 sq mi)

Population (2023)
  - Total: 3,989
  - Density: 145.1/km^{2} (375.8/sq mi)
- Time zone: UTC+1 (CET)
  - Summer (DST): UTC+2 (CEST)
- Postal code: 26-640
- Area code: +48 48
- Car plates: WRA
- Website: www.skaryszew.pl

Skaryszew [skaˈrɨʂɛf] is a town in Radom County, Masovian Voivodeship, Poland, with 4435 inhabitants (2023). The town is located on the Kobylanka river, and belongs to the historic region of Lesser Poland. In the past it was an important urban center of northern Lesser Poland, with town charter granted to Skaryszew as early as 1264.

== History ==
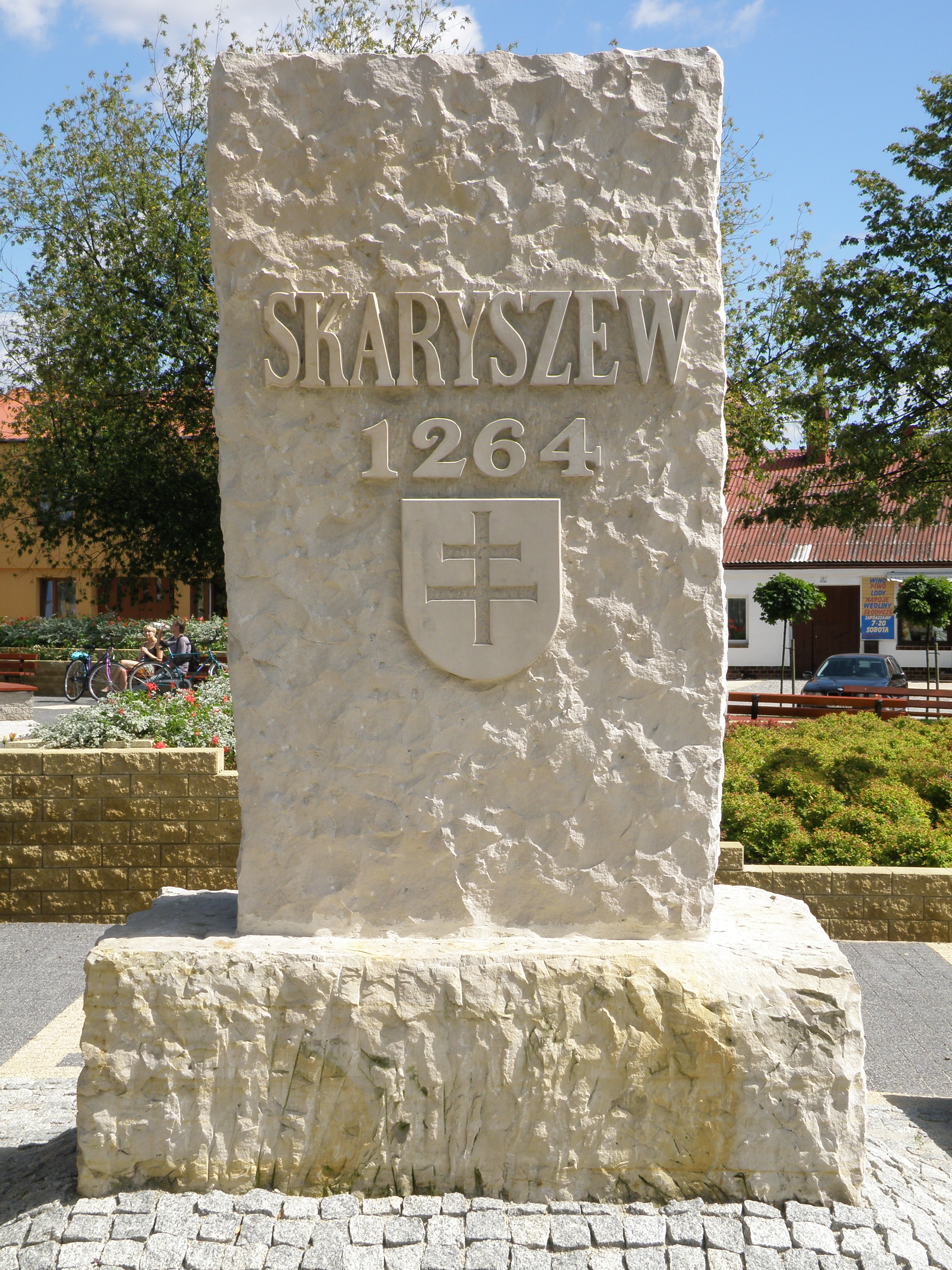
Monument commemorating the granting of town rights in 1264

First documented mention of Skaryszew comes from the year 1198, when the village belonged to the Abbey of Order of the Holy Sepulchre, located at Miechów. The monks opened here a branch of their abbey, and probably in the late 12th century, a wooden church of St. Jacob was built, together with a house for the monks. Due to the efforts of the Order of the Holy Sepulchre, merchants and skilled artisans were attracted to the quickly growing village. Skaryszew was destroyed in the Mongol invasion of Poland, and soon afterwards, Duke of Kraków and Sandomierz Bolesław V the Chaste granted the village the so-called Środa Śląska town charter, based on the charter of Nowy Korczyn (see also Magdeburg rights). The charter was confirmed by King Casimir III the Great in 1354.

Skaryszew prospered in the late Middle Ages and the Polish Golden Age, but in the late 16th century, it began to decline, at the expense of the quickly developing urban center at Radom. The town had a bath house (late 15th century), Thursday fairs, a brewery, a town hall (before 1618), and a hospital (1629). Like in almost all Lesser Poland’s towns, the period of prosperity definitely ended during the Swedish invasion of Poland, when Skaryszew was ransacked and burned, with most of its inhabitants murdered (1655). By 1670, the population shrank to 363, and Skaryszew did not begin to recover until the 1760s, when the population grew to app. 700. The town became famous for its horse markets, which still exist and which are very popular.

In 1701, a new church was built, with two towers. The shape of Skaryszew's streets, established in the early 18th century, remains almost unchanged. At that time, most houses were made of timber, which resulted in frequent fires. Skaryszew had a town hall, located in the market square. In the Third Partition of Poland in 1795, it was annexed by Austria. Following the Austro-Polish War of 1809 it was regained by Poles and included within the short-lived Duchy of Warsaw, and after its dissolution it belonged to Russian-controlled Congress Poland (since 1815). In the late 19th century, the population grew to app. 1,300. In 1869, following the January Uprising, Skaryszew lost its town charter for 76 years. In an 1889 fire, almost whole village was burned, but it was quickly rebuilt.

In 1918 Poland regained independence and control of the town. On July 1, 1922, the government of the Second Polish Republic restored the town rights of Skaryszew. In the interbellum period, and in 1945 - 1975, Skaryszew belonged to Kielce Voivodeship. Before the outbreak of World War II, the town's population was 3,100.

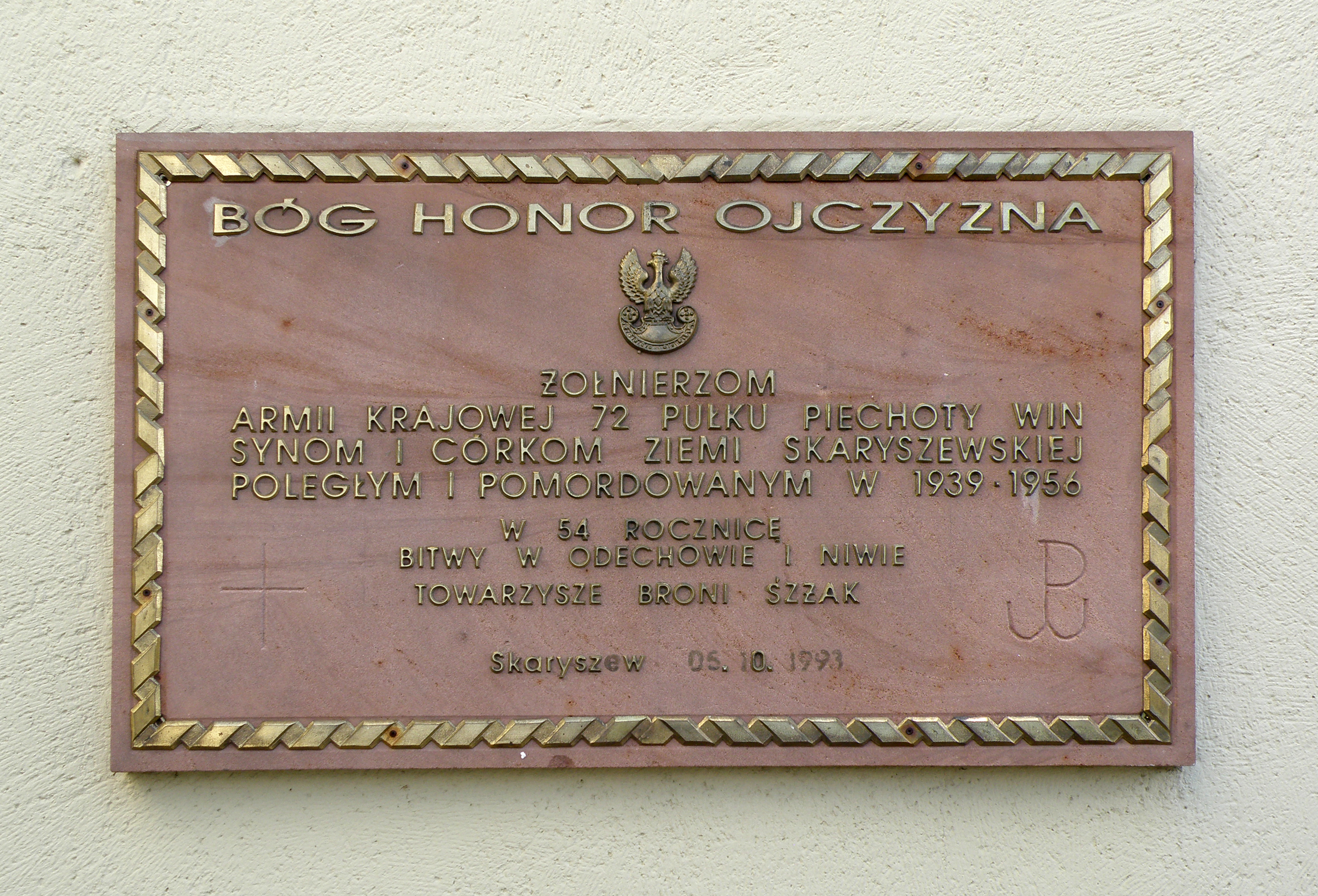
Memorial plaque to soldiers of the 72nd Infantry Regiment of the Home Army

On September 8, 1939, Skaryszew was bombed by the Luftwaffe. The war and German occupation brought destruction to the town, and its Jewish residents were murdered in the Holocaust. The local Polish police chief was murdered by the Russians in the Katyn massacre in 1940. In June 1944, the Germans carried out a public execution of Polish scouts, members of the Grey Ranks resistance organization (see Nazi crimes against the Polish nation).

== Horse markets ==
According to some sources, first horse market at Skaryszew took place in 1432. In 1633, King Władysław IV Vasa allowed the markets to be organized on the first Monday after Ash Wednesday, which usually is in mid-March. This tradition has been kept until today. During the 2012 horse market, members of several anti-cruelty organizations protested, claiming that horses are not treated properly by their owners, and those animals which are not sold, are in many cases killed for meat.

== Points of interest ==
- Baroque church of St. Jacob (17th century),
- 19th century Catholic cemetery, with a chapel.

== Symbols ==
Coat of arms: Sable a cross of lorraine gules. Flag: Gules, a wider central pale sable charged with a cross of lorraine of the first.
