= Gmina Zakrzew =

Gmina Zakrzew may refer to either of the following rural administrative districts in Poland:

- Gmina Zakrzew, Lublin Voivodeship
- Gmina Zakrzew, Masovian Voivodeship
