= Zakrzew-Kolonia =

Zakrzew-Kolonia may refer to the following places in Poland:

- Zakrzew-Kolonia, Lublin Voivodeship (eastern Poland)
- Zakrzew-Kolonia, Masovian Voivodeship (east-central Poland)
