= Teresa Grodzińska =

Polish nurse (1899–1920)

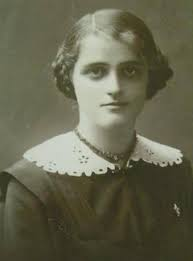
- Born: 20 December 1899; Jaszowice
- Died: 1 September 1920 (aged 20); Czortowice
- Occupation: Wartime nurse

Teresa Jadwiga Grodzińska (20 December, 1899 – 1 September, 1920) was a Polish wartime nurse killed during the Polish–Soviet War. She was the first woman in the Second Polish Republic to receive Poland's highest military decoration, Virtuti Militari.

== Biography ==
Teresa Grodzińska was born in Jaszowice. She attended a school in Radom and graduated in 1916, then two years later continued her education in Warsaw. In the spring of 1920, at the height of the Polish–Soviet War, she interrupted her studies to learn first aid and work at the Ujazdów military hospital. In July she volunteered to join the army and was assigned to the 2nd battalion of 4th Legions' Infantry Regiment which, at the time, was stationed near Hrubieszów. She showed great bravery while providing triage to the soldiers and helping evacuate the wounded from the battlefields. She carried the wounded on her back across a burning bridge on the Huczwa river. On 1 September she was taken prisoner by the Russian 1st Cavalry Army, and murdered the same day after being transported to Czortowice.

After the war, Grodzińska was praised in the Polish press and was commemorated with plaques at the Ujazdów hospital, the retaining wall below the Wawel Castle, and at her old school. In February 1921, she received Poland's highest military decoration Virtuti Militari (Silver Cross – Class V), becoming the first woman in Second Polish Republic to be honored in this way.

Grodzińska is a patron of one of the streets in Radom.
