= Majdan Starowiejski =

- Village
- Location within Poland
- Coordinates: 50°57′N 22°29′E
- Country: Poland
- Voivodeship: Lublin Voivodeship
- County: Lublin County
- Gmina: Zakrzew

Majdan Starowiejski (Polish pronunciation: [ˈmajdan starɔˈvjɛjskʲi]) is a village in the administrative district of Gmina Zakrzew, within Lublin County, Lublin Voivodeship, in eastern Poland. It lies approximately 11 kilometres (7 mi) north-west of Zakrzew and 34 km (21 mi) south of the regional capital Lublin.
