= Annów, Lublin Voivodeship =

Annów
- Village
- Location within Poland
- Coordinates: 50°55′19″N 22°29′43″E
- Country: Poland
- Voivodeship: Lublin Voivodeship
- County: Lublin County
- Gmina: Zakrzew

Annów [ˈannuf] is a village in the administrative district of Gmina Zakrzew, within Lublin County, Lublin Voivodeship, in eastern Poland. It lies approximately 8 kilometres (5 mi) north-west of Zakrzew and 37 km (23 mi) south of the regional capital Lublin.
