= Battle of Radom (1656) =

Battle of the Second Northern War

- Part of the Northern War of 1655–1660 and the Deluge
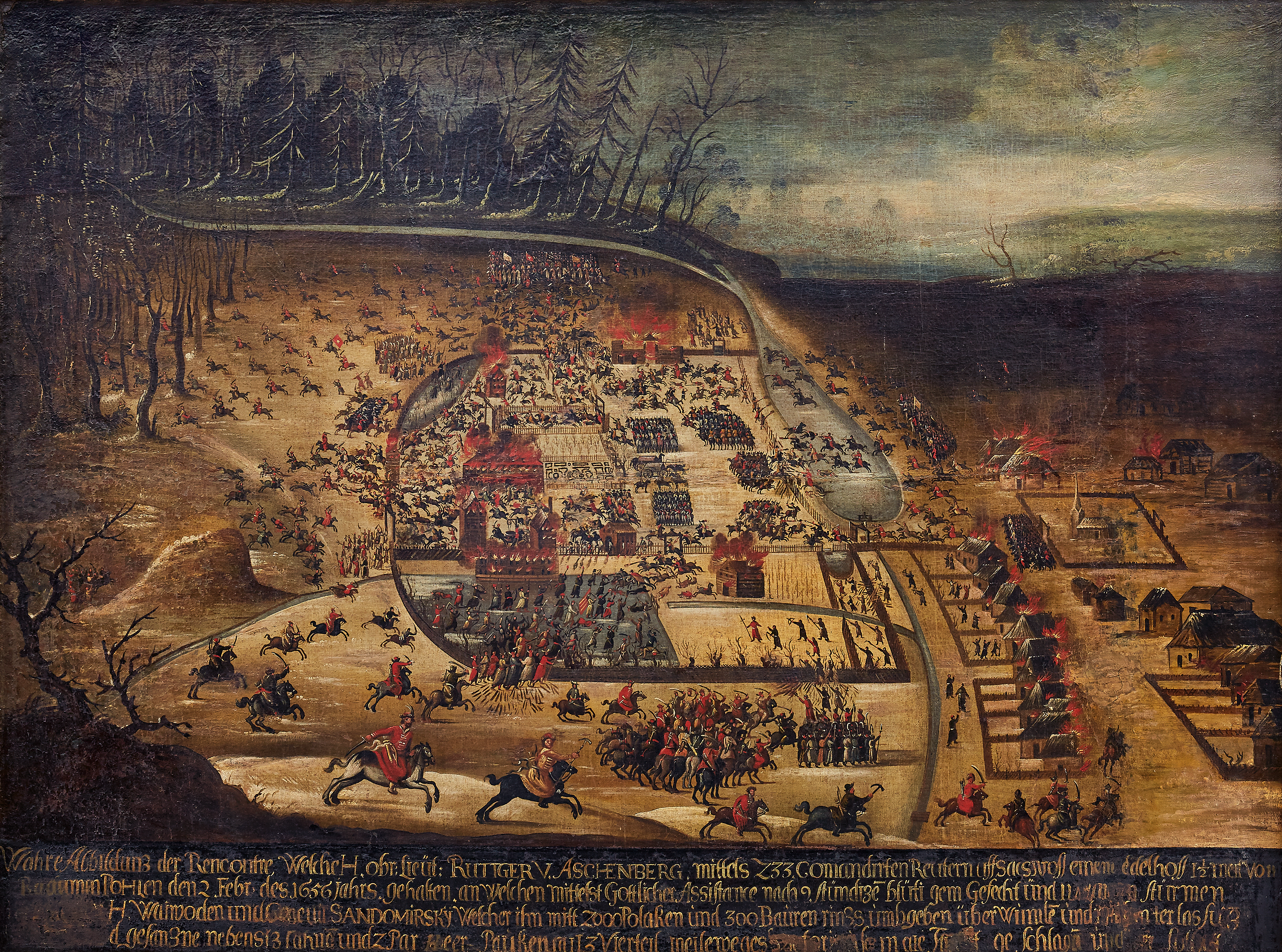
- Contemporary oil painting of the battle
| Date | 2 February 1656 (O.S.); 12 February 1656 (N.S.) |
| Location | Zakrzew near Radom, Sandomierz Voivodeship, Polish–Lithuanian Commonwealth |
| Result | See § Aftermath |

Belligerents
| Swedish Empire | Polish–Lithuanian Commonwealth |

Commanders and leaders
| (Swedish Empire) Rutger von Ascheberg | (Polish–Lithuanian Commonwealth) Stanisław Witowski |

Strength
| 250–300 | 1,500–2,000 |

Casualties and losses
| 14 killed 18 wounded | 100–560 killed or captured |

The Battle of Radom was fought on 2 February (O.S.) / 12 February (N.S.), as part of the Second Northern War and the Deluge, between the forces of the Swedish Empire commanded by Rutger von Ascheberg against the forces of the Polish–Lithuanian Commonwealth commanded by Stanisław Witowski.

== Prelude ==
In January of 1656, Ascheberg led an expedition of some 250–300 men from Łódź, to reconnoitre and seize the town of Radom. On 1 February (O.S.), they arrived at the manor Zakrzew, close to Radom, where they established night quarters.

== Battle ==
In the morning, the manor house was attacked by a significantly larger Polish force, reportedly between 1,500 and 2,000 men – in part consisting of levies with improvised weapons – under Stanisław Witowski. Ascheberg and his men repulsed repeated Polish attacks.

According to some sources, Witowski managed to set the manor house on fire in the evening which finally compelled the Swedes to break out and fight their way through the attackers, moving under the cover of darkness. The Poles were unable to stop or pursue them. Other sources claim that, as the fire was unable to dislodge the Swedes, Witowski initiated negotiations with the Swedish commander; the negotiations ended as the Poles launched a last-ditch assault on the manor, once again being repulsed. This allowed Ascheberg to then continue to Radom.

== Aftermath ==
On the following day, Ascheberg occupied Radom Castle, the objective of his foray. Some of his men had been captured by Witowski during the breakout. Both sides regarded the engagement as a victory.

Ascheberg initially reported that the Poles had been 1,500 strong in the battle and lost over 100 killed, as well as 80 horses to the Swedes. Believing his after action report would not completely satisfy Charles X Gustav, and that the Poles were spreading false rumors following the battle, he would work on saving his reputation in several subsequent writings; in his later journal, the Polish numbers were increased to 2,000, of which 560 were killed, and 413 horses had been captured. The Swedish losses were at least 14 killed and 18 wounded.

== Works cited ==
- Essen, Michael (2022). Charles X's Wars Vol.2: The Wars in the East, 1655-1657. Helion & Company. ISBN 9781915070302.
- Åberg, Alf (1950). Rutger von Ascheberg: fältmarskalk och generalguvernör (in Swedish). Malmö: Gleerups. OCLC 186665185.
