= Nikodemów =

- Village
- Location within Poland
- Coordinates: 50°55′N 22°33′E
- Country: Poland
- Voivodeship: Lublin Voivodeship
- County: Lublin County
- Gmina: Zakrzew

Nikodemów [nikɔˈdɛmuf] is a village in the administrative district of Gmina Zakrzew, within Lublin County, Lublin Voivodeship, in eastern Poland. It lies approximately 5 kilometres (3 mi) north-west of Zakrzew and 37 km (23 mi) south of the regional capital Lublin.
