= Wólka Ponikiewska =

- Village
- Location within Poland
- Coordinates: 50°52′N 22°35′E
- Country: Poland
- Voivodeship: Lublin Voivodeship
- County: Lublin County
- Gmina: Zakrzew

Wólka Ponikiewska [ˈvulka pɔniˈkʲɛfska] is a village in the administrative district of Gmina Zakrzew, within Lublin County, Lublin Voivodeship, in eastern Poland. It lies approximately 3 kilometres (2 mi) south of Zakrzew and 43 km (27 mi) south of the regional capital Lublin.
