= Dębina, Gmina Zakrzew =

Dębina
- Village
- Location within Poland
- Coordinates: 50°55′55″N 22°28′42″E
- Country: Poland
- Voivodeship: Lublin Voivodeship
- County: Lublin County
- Gmina: Zakrzew

Dębina [dɛmˈbina] is a village in the administrative district of Gmina Zakrzew, within Lublin County, Lublin Voivodeship, in eastern Poland. It lies approximately 10 kilometres (6 mi) north-west of Zakrzew and 36 km (22 mi) south of the regional capital Lublin.
