= Boża Wola, Lublin County =

Boża Wola
- Village
- Location within Poland
- Coordinates: 50°55′23″N 22°27′28″E
- Country: Poland
- Voivodeship: Lublin Voivodeship
- County: Lublin County
- Gmina: Zakrzew

Boża Wola [ˈbɔʐa ˈvɔla] is a village in the administrative district of Gmina Zakrzew, within Lublin County, Lublin Voivodeship, in eastern Poland. It lies approximately 11 kilometres (7 mi) west of Zakrzew and 37 km (23 mi) south of the regional capital Lublin.
