= Tarnawka Druga =

Coordinates: 50°54′57″N 22°37′17″E

- Village
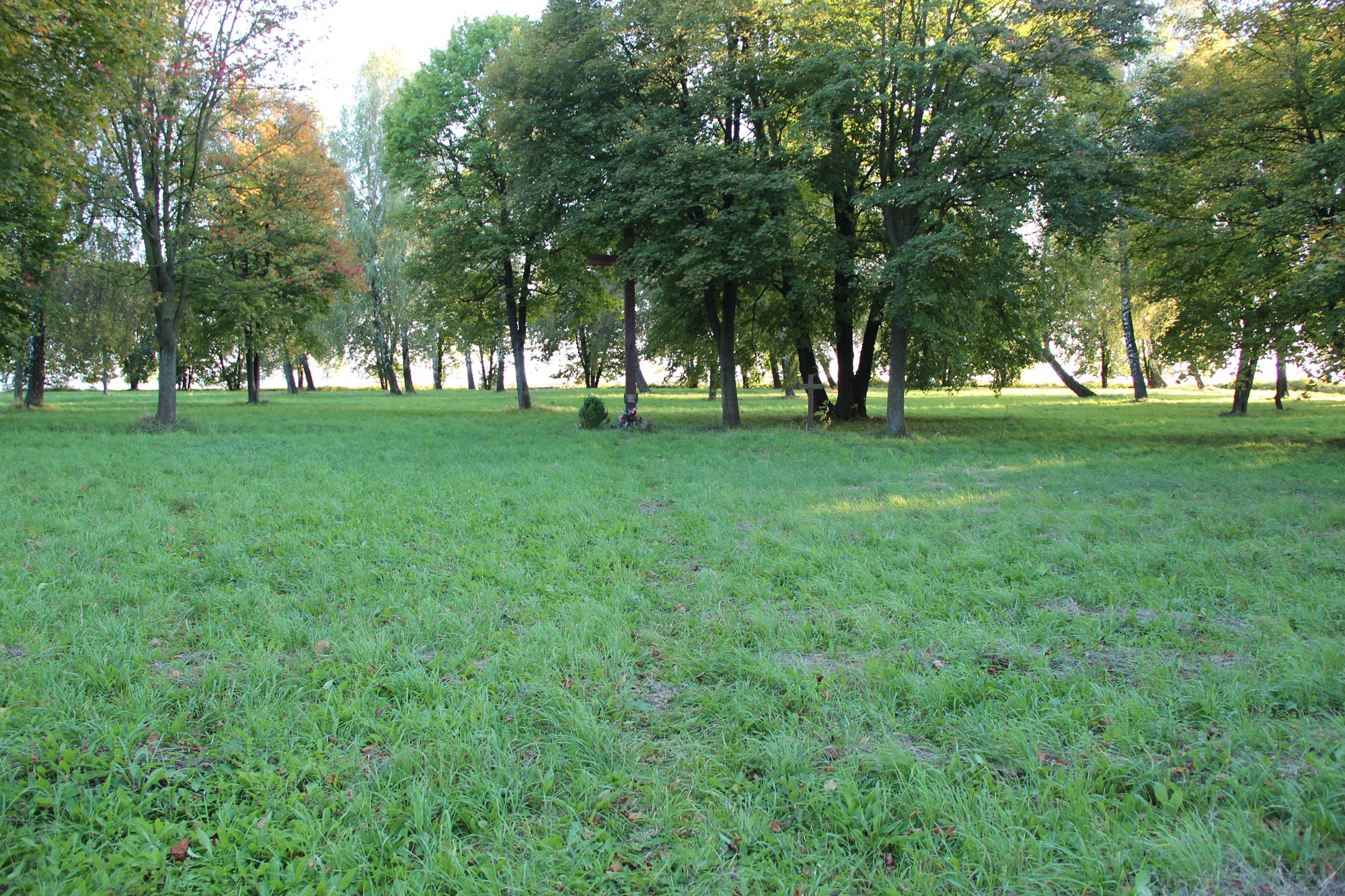
- Interactive map of Tarnawka Druga
- Country: Poland
- Voivodeship: Lublin Voivodeship
- County: Lublin County
- Gmina: Zakrzew

Tarnawka Druga [tarˈnafka ˈdruɡa] is a village in the administrative district of Gmina Zakrzew, within Lublin County, Lublin Voivodeship, in eastern Poland.
