= Baraki, Lublin County =

Coordinates: 50°54′0″N 22°33′50″E

Baraki
- Village
- Location within Poland
- Country: Poland
- Voivodeship: Lublin Voivodeship
- County: Lublin County
- Gmina: Zakrzew

Baraki [baˈraki] is a village in the administrative district of Gmina Zakrzew, within Lublin County, Lublin Voivodeship, in eastern Poland.
