= Tarnawka Pierwsza =

Coordinates: 50°54′50″N 22°35′48″E

- Village
- Location within Poland
- Country: Poland
- Voivodeship: Lublin Voivodeship
- County: Lublin County
- Gmina: Zakrzew

Tarnawka Pierwsza [tarˈnafka ˈpjɛrfʂa] is a village in the administrative district of Gmina Zakrzew, within Lublin County, Lublin Voivodeship, in eastern Poland.
