= Zdziechów, Radom County =

Zdziechów
- Village
- Location within Poland
- Coordinates: 51°25′10″N 21°03′03″E
- Country: Poland
- Voivodeship: Masovian
- County: Radom
- Gmina: Zakrzew

Zdziechów [ˈzd͡ʑɛxuf] is a village in the administrative district of Gmina Zakrzew, within Radom County, Masovian Voivodeship, in east-central Poland.
