= Janiszew, Masovian Voivodeship =

Janiszew
- Village
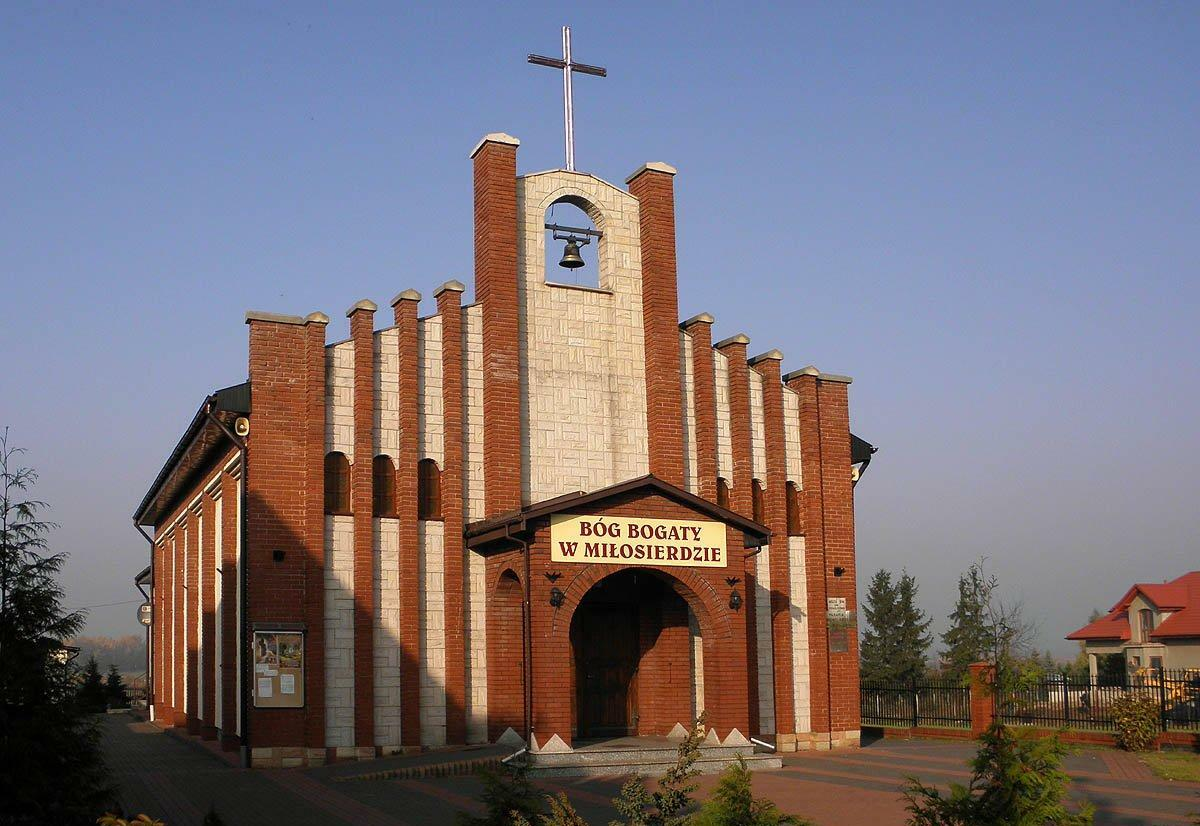
- The parish church in Janiszewo

- Location within Poland
- Coordinates: 51°25′48″N 21°07′05″E
- Country: Poland
- Voivodeship: Masovian
- County: Radom
- Gmina: Zakrzew
- Population: 168

Janiszew [jaˈniʂɛf] is a village in the administrative district of Gmina Zakrzew, within Radom County, Masovian Voivodeship, in east-central Poland.
