= Legęzów =

- Village
- Location within Poland
- Coordinates: 51°27′47″N 21°03′39″E
- Country: Poland
- Voivodeship: Masovian
- County: Radom
- Gmina: Zakrzew

Legęzów [lɛˈɡɛ̃zuf] is a village in the administrative district of Gmina Zakrzew, within Radom County, Masovian Voivodeship, in east-central Poland. It is located in the time zone Central European Summer Time. Data on the UTC standard, universal coordinated time. Its closest airport is Warsaw Chopin Airport.
