= Dąbrówka Podłężna =

- Village
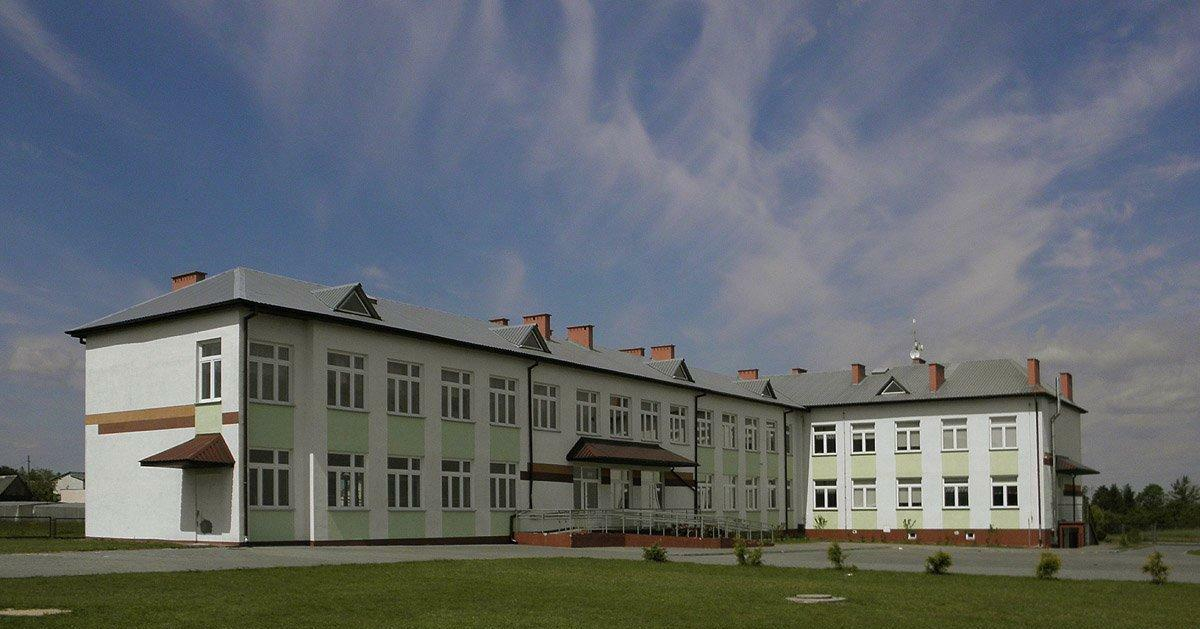
- Elementary school building in Dąbrówka Podłężna

- Location within Poland
- Coordinates: 51°28′34″N 21°03′01″E
- Country: Poland
- Voivodeship: Masovian
- County: Radom
- Gmina: Zakrzew

Dąbrówka Podłężna [dɔmˈbrufka pɔdˈwɛ̃ʐna] is a village in the administrative district of Gmina Zakrzew, within Radom County, Masovian Voivodeship, in east-central Poland.
