= Targowisko-Kolonia =

Coordinates: 50.8823°N 22.6318°E

- Village
- Location within Poland
- Country: Poland
- Voivodeship: Lublin Voivodeship
- County: Lublin County
- Gmina: Zakrzew

Targowisko-Kolonia [tarɡɔˈviskɔ kɔˈlɔɲa] is a village in the administrative district of Gmina Zakrzew, within Lublin County, Lublin Voivodeship, in eastern Poland.
