= Taczowskie Pieńki =

- Village
- Location within Poland
- Coordinates: 51°27′37″N 21°00′45″E
- Country: Poland
- Voivodeship: Masovian
- County: Radom
- Gmina: Zakrzew

Taczowskie Pieńki [taˈt͡ʂɔfskʲɛ ˈpjɛɲki] is a village in the administrative district of Gmina Zakrzew, within Radom County, Masovian Voivodeship, in east-central Poland.
