= Szklarnia, Lublin County =

Coordinates: 50.9153°N 22.5128°E

Szklarnia
- Village
- Location within Poland
- Country: Poland
- Voivodeship: Lublin Voivodeship
- County: Lublin County
- Gmina: Zakrzew

Szklarnia [ˈʂklarɲa] is a village in the administrative district of Gmina Zakrzew, within Lublin County, Lublin Voivodeship, in eastern Poland.
