= Gustaw Paszkiewicz =

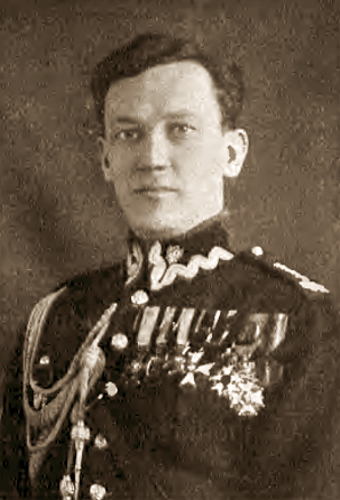
Gustaw Paszkiewicz

Gustaw Paszkiewicz (1 April 1892 – 27 February 1955) was a soldier of the Imperial Russian Army, and officer of the Polish Army. He entered the military service in 1914, at the age of 22, fighting as Russian soldier in World War I. Paszkiewicz was a soldier until 1952.

Gustaw Paszkiewicz was born on 1 April 1892 in the village of Wasiliszki in the Vilna Governorate of the Russian Empire (present-day Belarus) to Leonard Paszkiewicz and Justyna née Tabenska. His younger brother Wilhelm was a colonel of the Polish Army, murdered by the NKVD in the Katyn massacre.

After graduation from a gymnasium in Minsk, Paszkiewicz joined the Vilnius Military School. In 1914–1917 he fought in the Russian Army, and then joined Polish I Corps in Russia, in which he was company leader of the 3rd Rifles Regiment. He fought in the Polish–Soviet War in the area of Lwów and Stryj, as commandant of the 55th Infantry Regiment. In 1923–24, Paszkiewicz attended Wyższa Szkoła Wojenna in Warsaw, after which he was promoted to the rank of officer in the Polish General Staff. In 1924–1926, Paszkiewicz commanded Officer School of Infantry in Warsaw, and in October 1926 was named commandant of divisional infantry at 24th Infantry Division, stationed in Jarosław. On 12 October 1935 Paszkiewicz was named commandant of the 12th Infantry Division from Tarnopol.

In the Invasion of Poland, the 12th Division belonged to Prusy Army, and was destroyed in the Battle of Radom. Paszkiewicz managed to get out of German encirclement, to reach Włodzimierz Wołyński on 13 September 1939. Two days later he was named deputy commandant of Karpaty Army. Twice wounded, Paszkiewicz left Poland for Romania, where he was interned. From 1 December 1939 until 23 June 1940 he was deputy of Minister Kazimierz Sosnkowski in the government of Władysław Sikorski.

In 1940, Paszkiewicz reached France, but after its collapse, he had to flee to Great Britain. In the Polish Armed Forces in the West, he commanded 1st Rifle Brigade (October 1940 – May 1942), 4th Rifle Division (May – October 1942), 2nd Independent Armoured Brigade (October 1942 – June 1943), and then was deputy of the I Corps in the West.

On 18 December 1945 Gustaw Paszkiewicz returned to Poland, and on 15 January 1946 he joined the Polish People's Army. Soon afterwards, he was appointed commandant of the 16th Infantry Division from Białystok, as well as head of local security office, which coordinated the operations against anti-Communist guerrillas (Cursed soldiers). From 18 October 1946 until 14 October 1948 Paszkiewicz commanded Warsaw Military District, after which he worked at the Ministry of Forestry and was an envoy to the Sejm.

Paszkiewicz died on 27 February 1955 in Warsaw, and was buried at the Powązki Cemetery.

== Promotions ==
- Second Lieutenant – 1915
- Lieutenant – 1916
- Captain – 1917
- Podpolkovnik (Sub Colonel) – 1919
- Colonel – 1924
- General brygady – 1938
- Divisional general – 1946

== Awards ==
- Cavalier Cross of the Virtuti Militari,
- Gold Cross of the Virtuti Militari,
- Silver Cross of the Virtuti Militari,
- Commander's Cross of the Order of Polonia Restituta,
- Officer Cross of the Order of Polonia Restituta,
- Order of the Cross of Grunwald, Third Class,
- Cross of Independence,
- Cross of Valour (Poland),
- Commandor of the Order of the Bath
- Officer of the Order of Leopold (Belgium), Fourth Classm
- Officer of the Legion of Honour, Fifth Class,
- Commandor of the Order of St. Sava, Third Class,
- 1914–1918 Inter-Allied Victory medal (France).

== Sources ==
- Tadeusz Jurga: Obrona Polski 1939. Warszawa: Instytut Wydawniczy PAX, 1990
- Warszawski Okręg Wojskowy. Historia i współczesność, Wyd. Bellona, Warszawa 1997
