= Wacyn =

- Village
- Location within Poland
- Coordinates: 51°25′N 21°7′E
- Country: Poland
- Voivodeship: Masovian
- County: Radom
- Gmina: Zakrzew

Wacyn [ˈvat͡sɨn] is a village in the administrative district of Gmina Zakrzew, within Radom County, Masovian Voivodeship, in east-central Poland.
