= Zakrzew-Las =

- Village
- Location within Poland
- Coordinates: 51°26′17″N 20°59′15″E
- Country: Poland
- Voivodeship: Masovian
- County: Radom
- Gmina: Zakrzew

Zakrzew-Las [ˈzakʂɛf ˈlas] is a village in the administrative district of Gmina Zakrzew, within Radom County, Masovian Voivodeship, in east-central Poland.
