= Targowisko, Lublin Voivodeship =

Coordinates: 50.8693°N 22.6321°E

Targowisko
- Village
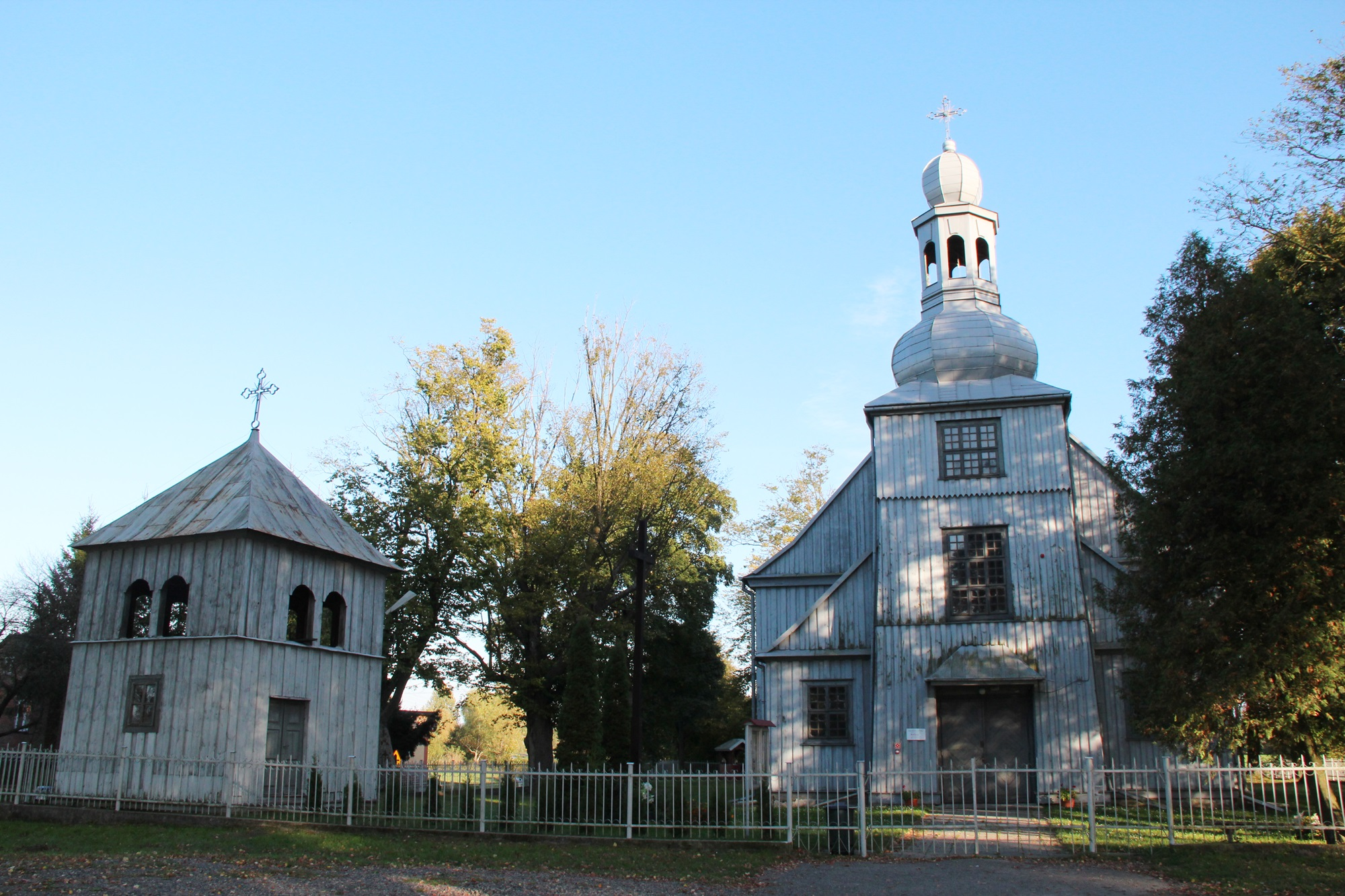
- Interactive map of Targowisko
- Country: Poland
- Voivodeship: Lublin Voivodeship
- County: Lublin County
- Gmina: Zakrzew

Targowisko [tarɡɔˈviskɔ] is a village in the administrative district of Gmina Zakrzew, within Lublin County, Lublin Voivodeship, in eastern Poland.

== 2026 Russian Missile Strike ==
On 30 July 2026, Russia launched a large scale missile and drone attack on Western Ukraine. As a result of this attack, A Russian Kh-101 missile violated Polish Airspace. This caused sirens to go off in cities in Eastern Poland, such as Lublin. An impact crater was found in the fields near the village. At the same time as citizens heard an explosion, Polish F-16s and Polish military helicopters were flying over the impact site.
