= Natalin, Radom County =

Natalin
- Village
- Location within Poland
- Coordinates: 51°27′N 21°1′E
- Country: Poland
- Voivodeship: Masovian
- County: Radom
- Gmina: Zakrzew

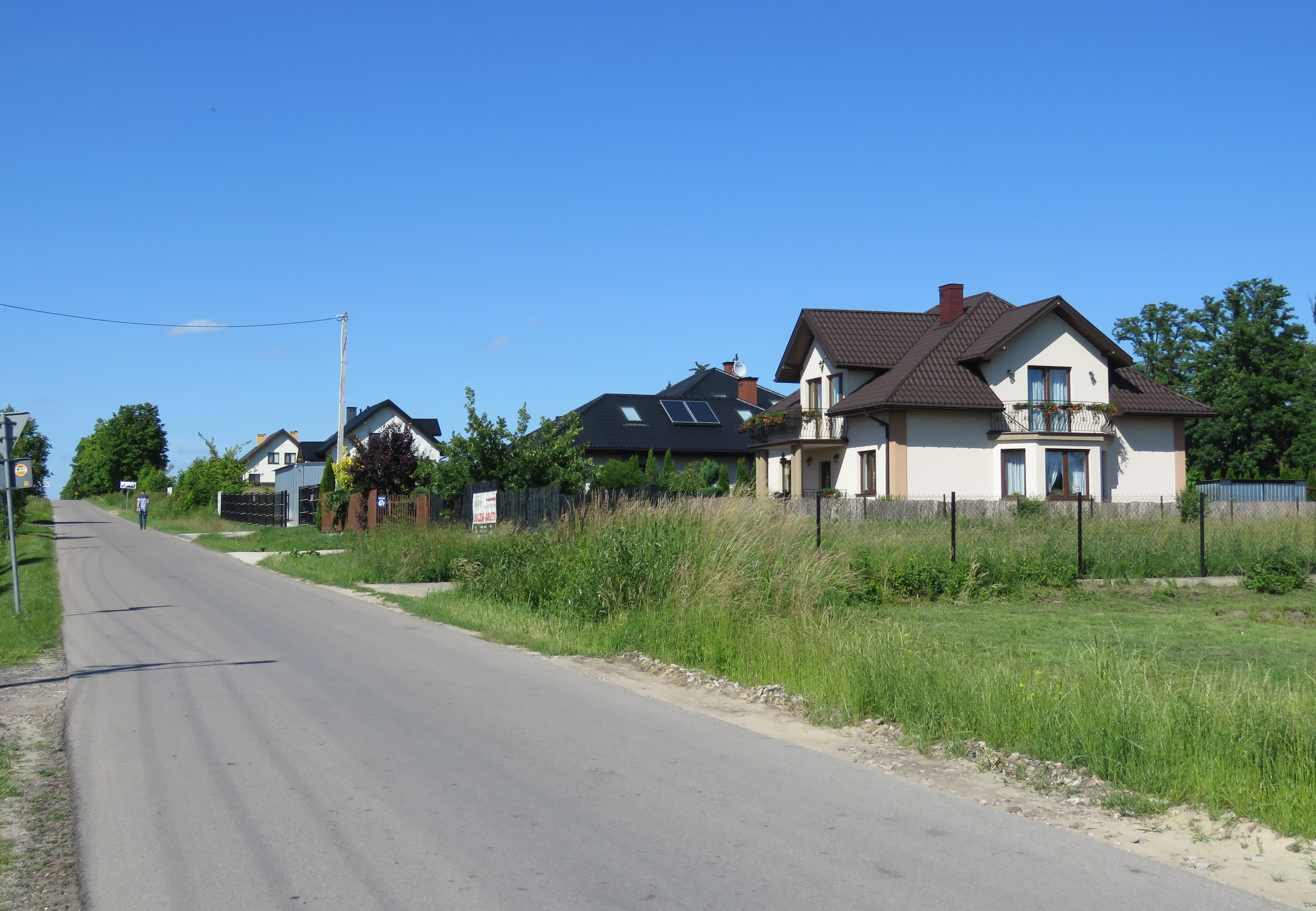
Natalin

Natalin [naˈtalin] is a village in the administrative district of Gmina Zakrzew, within Radom County, Masovian Voivodeship, in east-central Poland.
