= Karolin, Gmina Zakrzew =

Coordinates: 50°55′24″N 22°33′00″E

Karolin
- Village
- Location within Poland
- Country: Poland
- Voivodeship: Lublin Voivodeship
- County: Lublin County
- Gmina: Zakrzew
- Time zone: UTC+1 (CET)
  - Summer (DST): UTC+2 (CEST)

Karolin [kaˈrɔlin] is a village in the administrative district of Gmina Zakrzew, within Lublin County, Lublin Voivodeship, in eastern Poland.

== History ==
Four Polish citizens were murdered by Nazi Germany in the village during World War II.
