= Dąbrówka Nagórna-Wieś =

Village in Gmina Zakrzew, Poland

Dąbrówka Nagórna
- Village
- Location within Poland
- Coordinates: 51°26′59″N 21°05′10″E
- Country: Poland
- Voivodeship: Masovian
- County: Radom
- Gmina: Zakrzew

Dąbrówka Nagórna [dɔmˈbrufka naˈɡurna ˈvjɛɕ] is a village in the administrative district of Gmina Zakrzew, within Radom County, Masovian Voivodeship, in east-central Poland.
