= Virtuti Militari =

Poland's highest military decoration

Virtuti Militari War Order of Virtuti Militari Order Wojenny Virtuti Militari
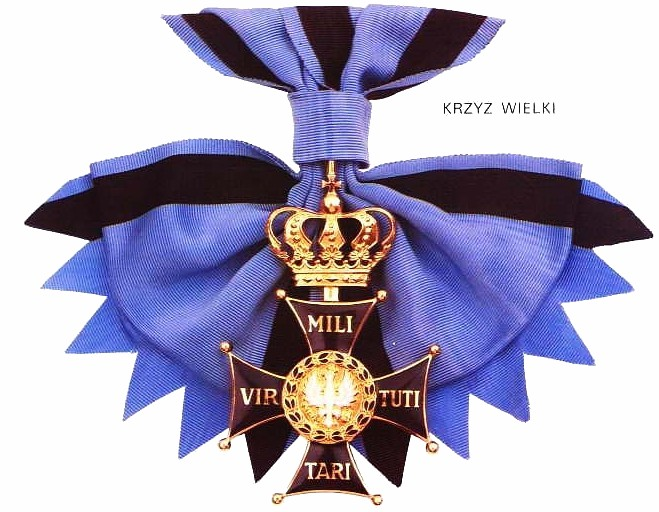
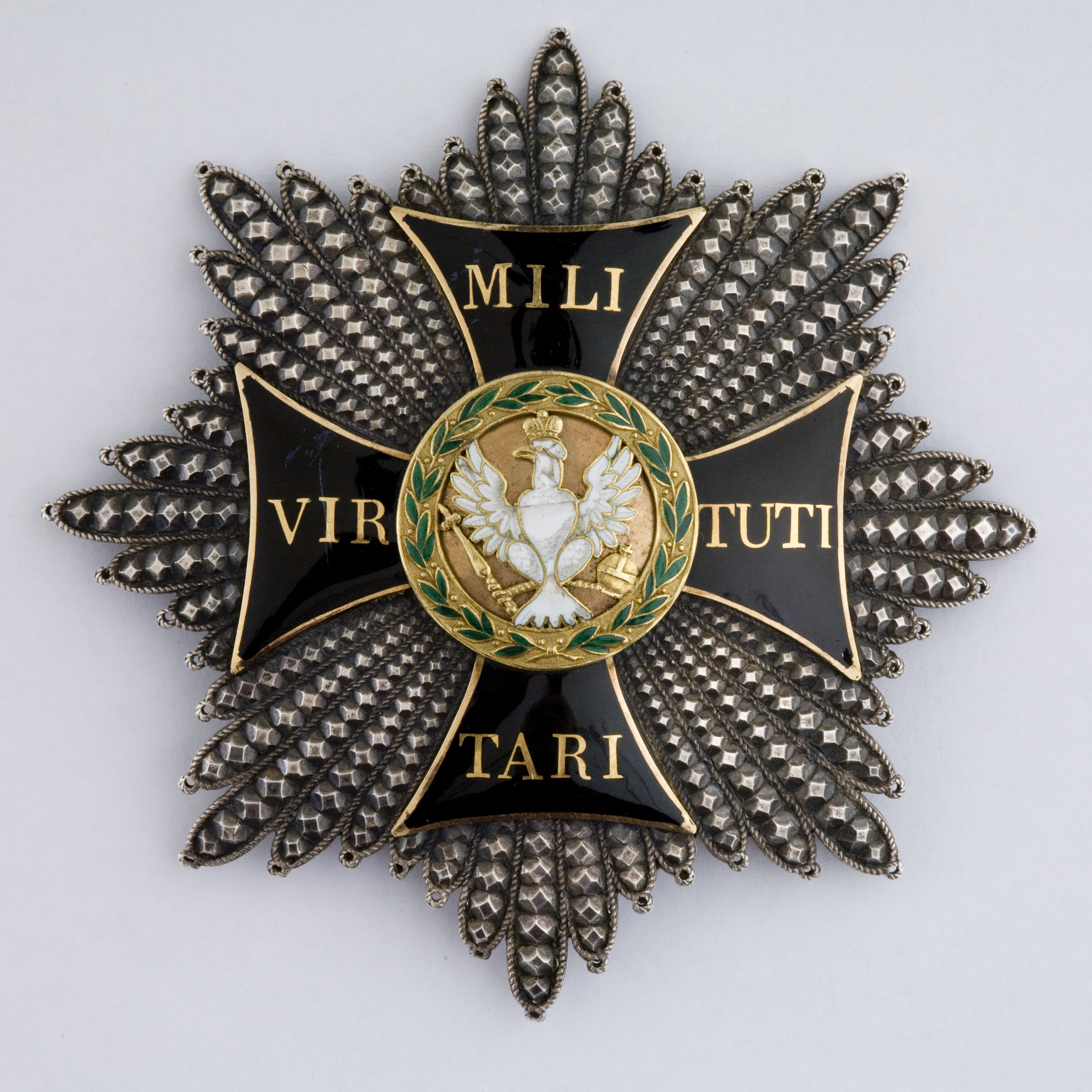
- Type: Order
- Awarded for: Virtue at War
- Country: Poland
- Presented by: the President of Poland
- Eligibility: Military personnel/ Military units
- Motto: HONOR I OJCZYZNA (Honor and Fatherland)
- Status: In the award system but a wartime decoration only
- Established: 22 June 1792
- First award: 1792
- Final award: 1989

Precedence
- Next (higher): Order of the White Eagle
- Next (lower): Order of Polonia Restituta

The War Order of Virtuti Militari (Latin: "For Military Virtue", Polish: Order Wojenny Virtuti Militari) is Poland's highest military decoration for heroism and courage in the face of the enemy at war. It was established in 1792 by the last King of Poland and ruler of the Polish–Lithuanian Commonwealth Stanislaus II Augustus and is the oldest exclusively military decoration in the world still in use.

Soon after the introduction of the order, however, the Polish–Lithuanian Commonwealth fell as a result of the partitions of Poland. The partitioning powers abolished the decoration and prohibited its wearing. Since then, the award has been reintroduced and banned several times, with its fate closely reflecting the vicissitudes of the Polish people. Throughout the decoration's existence, thousands of soldiers and officers, Polish and foreign, three cities and one warship have been awarded the Virtuti Militari for valor or outstanding leadership in war. There have been no new awards since 1989.

The order is awarded in five classes either for personal heroism or, to commanders, for leadership during the war. Some of the heroic actions recognized by the Virtuti Militari are equivalent to those meriting the British Victoria Cross and the American Medal of Honor.

== Beginnings ==
Medal chapter (1792–1794)

• Lt.Gen. Józef Poniatowski, Tadeusz Kościuszko
• Maj.Gen. Michał Wielhorski, Stanisław Mokronowski, Józef Zajączek
• Brig. Eustachy Sanguszko
• Col. Józef Poniatowski, Michał Chomętowski
• Lt.Col. Ludwik Kamieniecki
• Maj. Mikołaj Bronikowski, Józef Szczutowski
Lt. Michał Cichocki, Ludwik Metzel

• Sq.L. Bartłomiej Giżycki

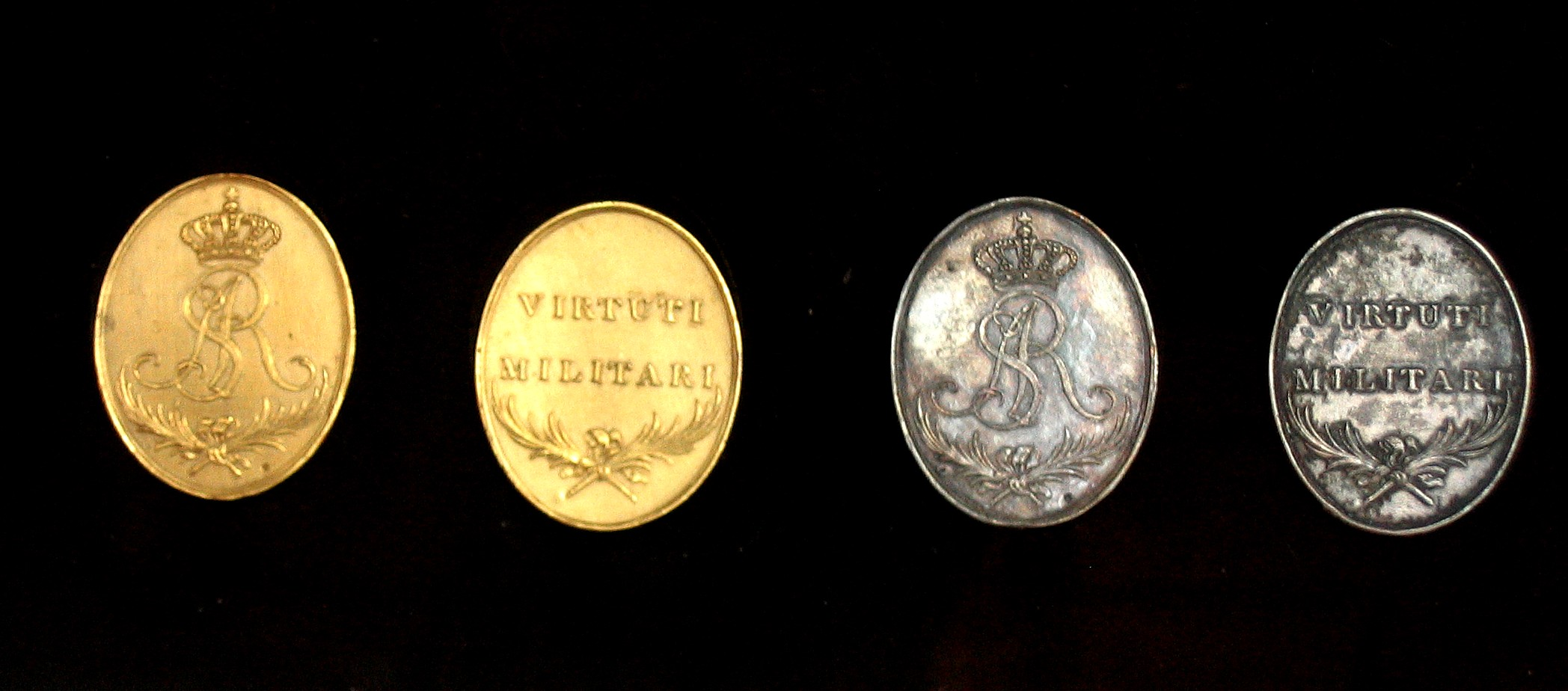
Medals Virtuti Militari 1792

Throughout its history, the War Order of Virtuti Militari has shared its country's fate, and has been abolished and reintroduced several times.

The order was originally created on 22 June 1792 by King Stanisław II August to commemorate the victorious Battle of Zieleńce. Initially, it comprised two classes: a golden medal for generals and officers, and a silver one for non-commissioned officers and ordinary soldiers. By August 1792, a statute for the decoration had been drafted, which was based on one that was created for the Austrian Military Order of Maria Theresa. The regulation changed the shape of the decoration from a medal to a cross, which has not changed substantially since then. It also introduced five classes to the order.

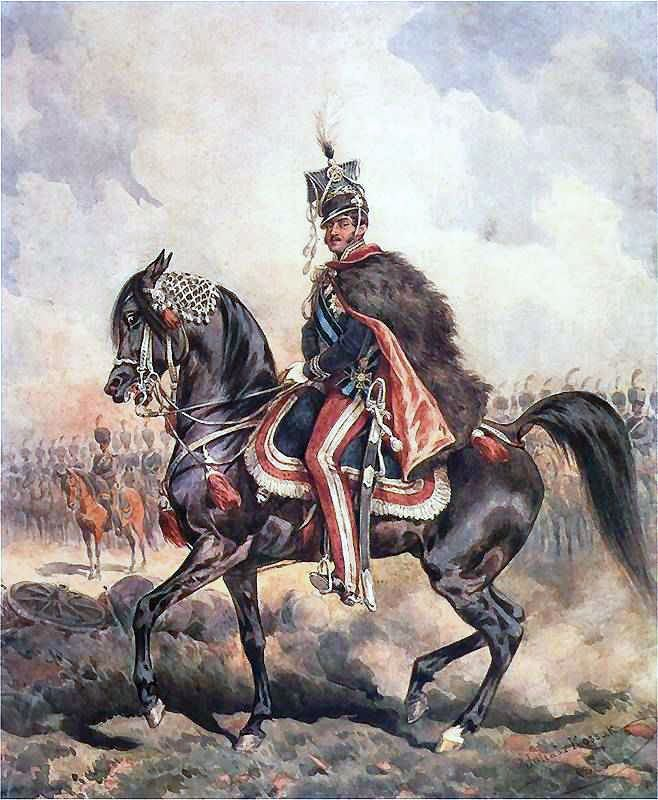
Józef Poniatowski

The first members of the decoration's chapter were also its first recipients. For the Polish-Russian War in Defence of the Constitution of 1792, a total of 63 officers and 290 NCOs and privates were awarded the Virtuti Militari. The statute was never fully implemented, however, since soon after its introduction the King acceded to the Targowica Confederation, which on 29 August 1792 abolished the decoration and prohibited its wearing. Anyone who wore the medal could be demoted and expelled from the army by Poland's new authorities.

Although on 23 November 1793 the Grodno Sejm reintroduced the decoration, it was banned again on 7 January 1794, at the insistence of Russia's Catherine the Great. Only a year later, the Polish–Lithuanian Commonwealth itself shared the fate of its decoration when what remained of the Commonwealth was annexed by its neighbors in the partitions of Poland. King Stanisław II August abdicated the same year. During his reign, 526 medals had been granted: 440 Silver Medals and Crosses, 85 Golden Medals and Crosses, and 1 Commander's Cross.

Among the most famous recipients of the Virtuti Militari in this period were Prince Józef Antoni Poniatowski (1763–1813) and Tadeusz Kościuszko (1746–1817), both able military commanders during the War in Defense of the Constitution and the Kościuszko Uprising.

Virtuti Militari Ribbon Bars
Silver Cross	Golden Cross	Knight's Cross	Commander's Cross	Grand Cross with Star

== Duchy of Warsaw ==
Recipients (1806–1815)

I Class (2 awarded):
• Prince Józef Poniatowski (25 February 1809)
• Louis Nicolas Davout (22 March 1809)
II Class (10 awarded):
• Józef Zajączek (1 February 1808)
• Jan Henryk Dąbrowski (6 March 1808)
• Karol Kniaziewicz (17 November 1812)
• Stanisław Fiszer (22 August 1809)
• Michał Sokolnicki (22 August 1809)
• Aleksander Rożniecki (22 August 1809)
• Józef Chłopicki (26 November 1810)
• Amilkar Kosiński (17 November 1812)
• Ludwik Pac (1 October 1813)
• Mikołaj Bronikowski
III Class (504 awarded)
IV Class (23 awarded)

V Class (1130 awarded)

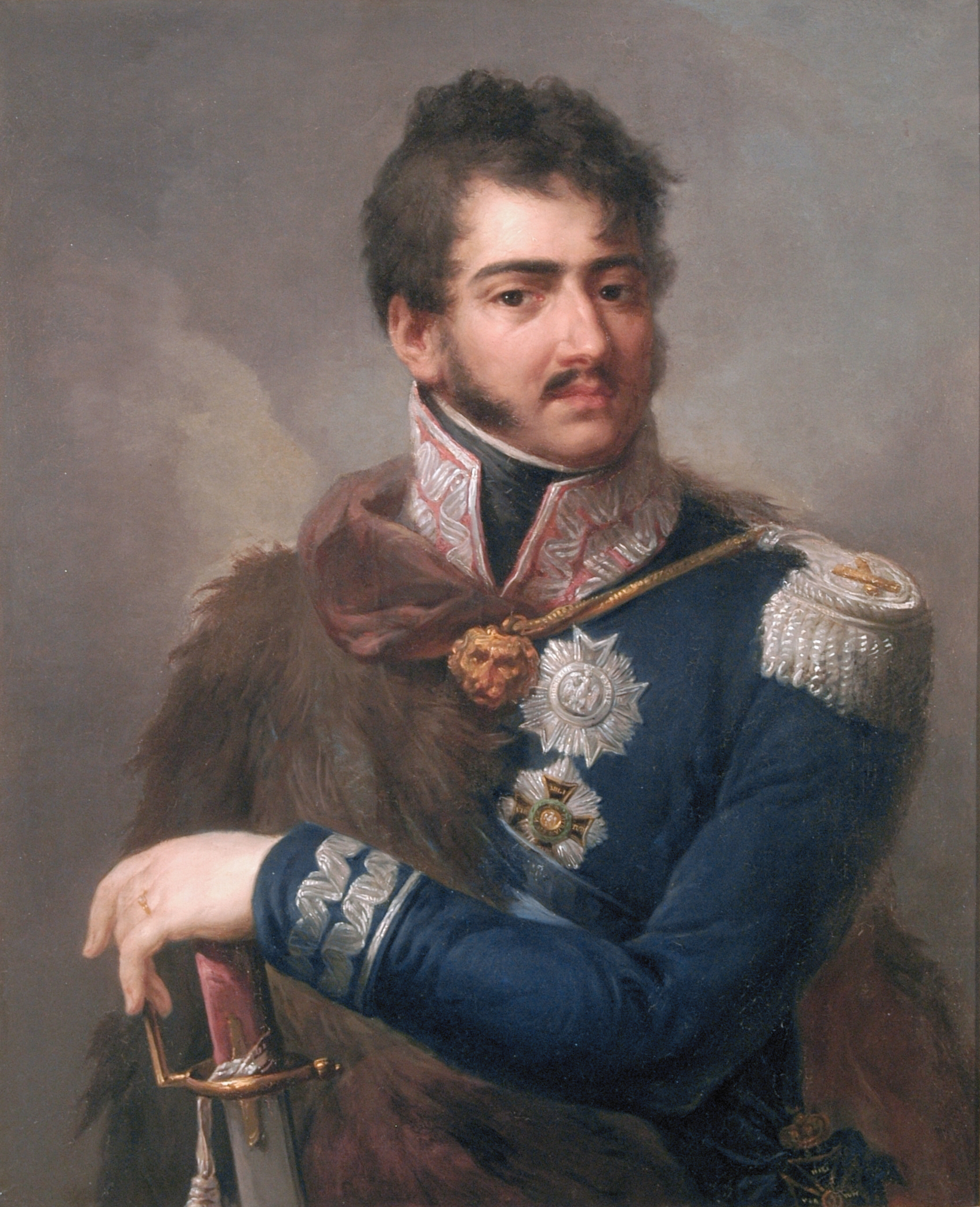
Prince Józef Poniatowski with Virtuti Militari star

In 1806, Lt. Gen. Prince Józef Poniatowski was promoted to commander-in-chief of all forces of the Duchy of Warsaw, the short-lived Polish state allied with Napoleon I of France. As one of the first recipients of the Virtuti Militari, Poniatowski insisted on the reintroduction of the decoration. Finally on 26 December 1806, the King of Saxony and Duke of Warsaw Fryderyk August Wettin accepted the proposal and reintroduced the Virtuti Militari as the highest military award for all Polish soldiers fighting alongside France in the Napoleonic Wars. The official name of the decoration was changed to the Military Medal of the Duchy of Warsaw; however, soldiers remained faithful to the former name. The royal decree also introduced a new class system that has been in use ever since, with the class of the cross depending on the rank of the soldier to whom it is awarded:

1. I Class – Grand Cross (with Star) (Krzyż Wielki z Gwiazdą, for commanders in chief)
2. II Class – Commander's Cross (Krzyż Komandorski, for division commanders)
3. III Class – Knight's Cross (Krzyż Kawalerski, for brigadiers, colonels and majors)
4. IV Class – Golden Cross (Krzyż Złoty)
5. V Class – Silver Cross (Krzyż Srebrny)

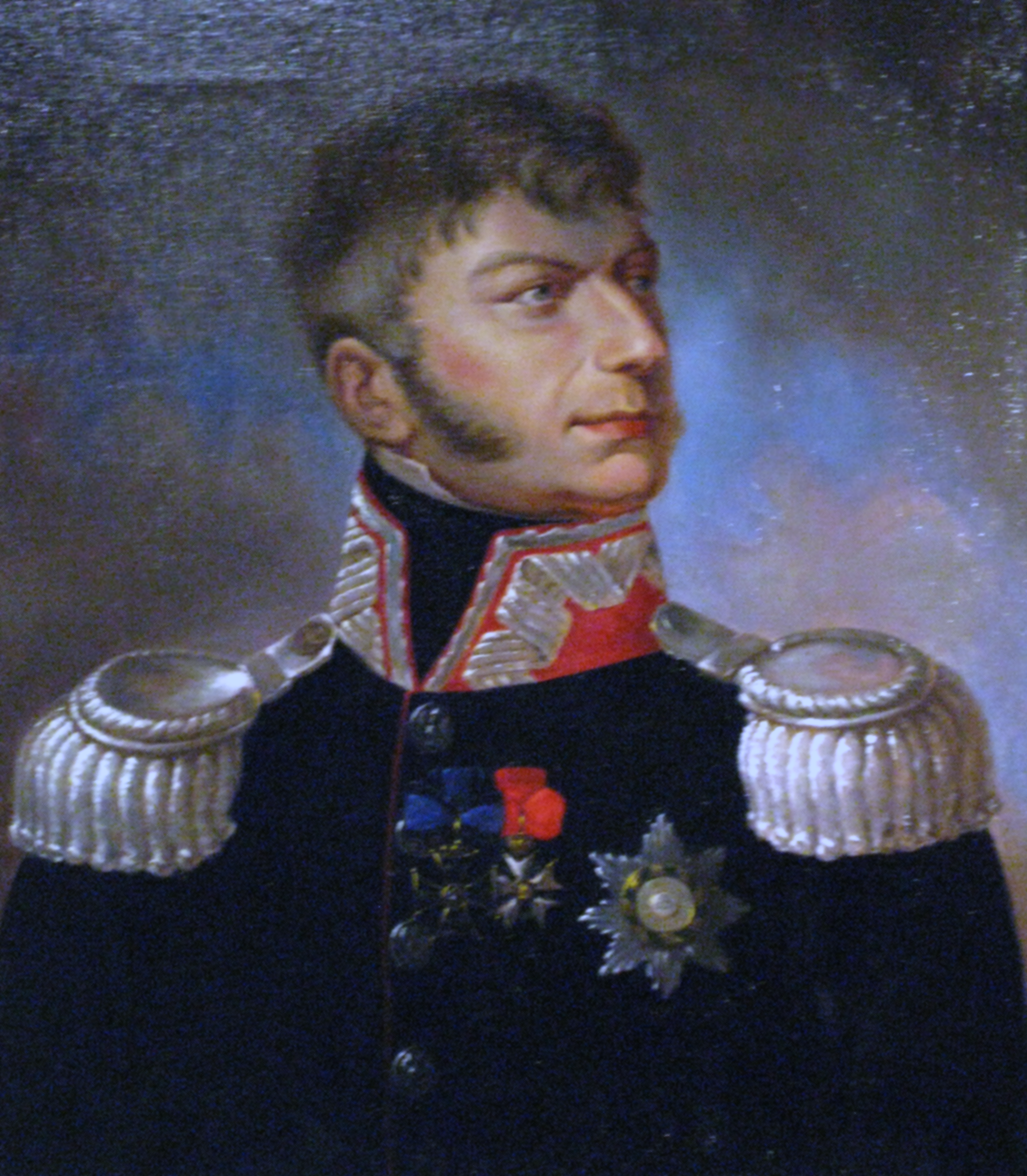
Józef Chłopicki

Initially each of the high commanders of the Army had a quota of Virtuti Militari to be awarded to his soldiers. However, the system was soon changed and, since then, the order has been usually awarded centrally for individual acts of bravery after being nominated by the chain of command. According to the decree of 10 October 1812, each of the recipients of a Golden or Silver Cross had the right to a yearly salary until promoted to officer or (if demobilised) for life. In addition, during the Napoleonic Wars, the present tradition of awarding the soldiers with the Virtuti Militari in front of the unit was established. Between 1806 and 1815, there were 2569 crosses awarded to Polish soldiers fighting on all fronts, from Santo Domingo to Russia and from Italy to Spain.

Among the famous recipients of the medal in this period were General Jan Henryk Dąbrowski (1755–1818), the organiser of Polish Legions in Italy during the Napoleonic Wars, after whom the Polish national anthem Mazurek Dąbrowskiego is named, and General Józef Chłopicki (1771–1854). Also, on 20 May 1809, Sergeant Joanna Żubr became the first woman to receive the decoration (V class) for her part in the assault on Zamość.

== Congress Poland ==
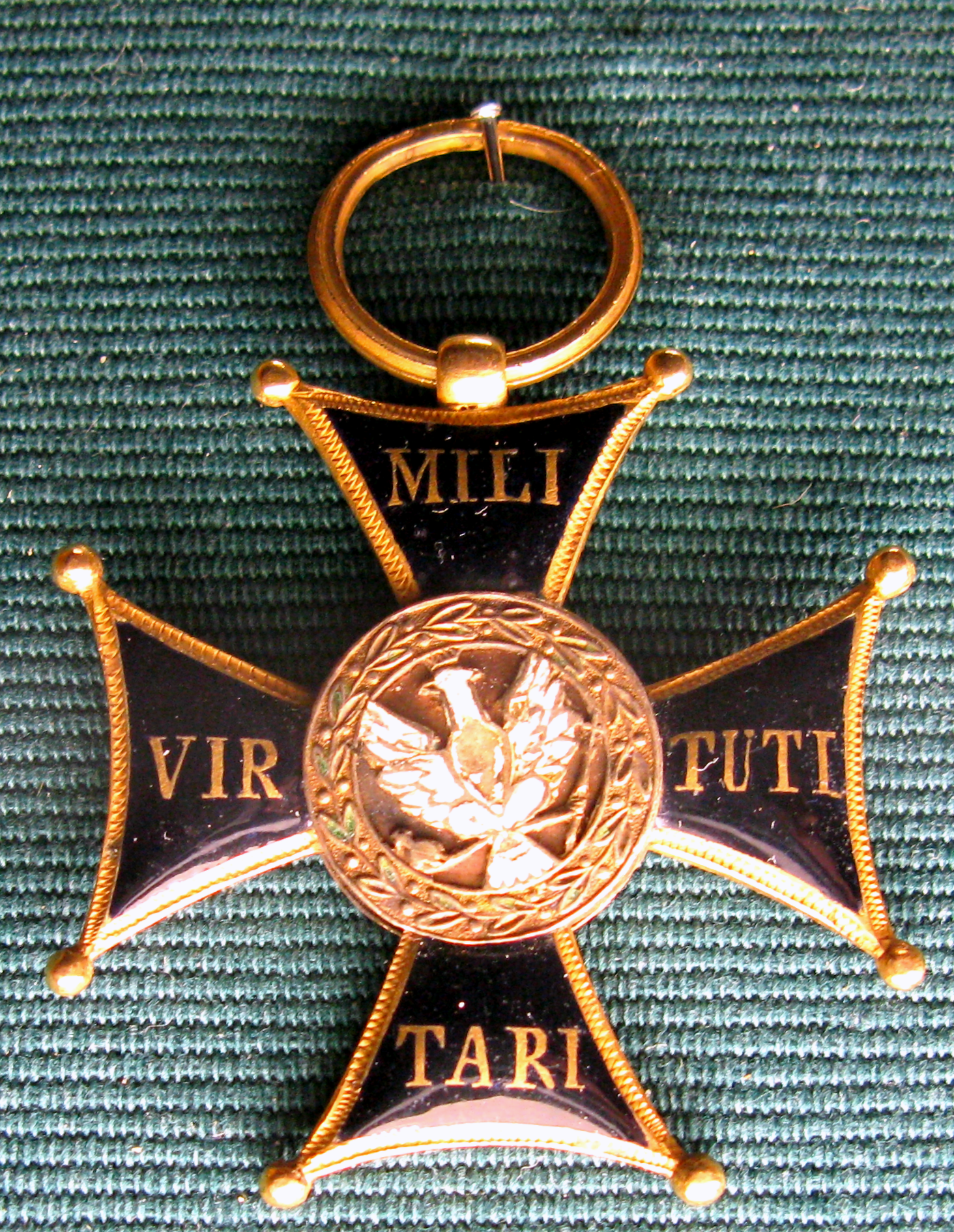
Chivalry Cross of Virtuti Militari from November Uprising 1831

Recipients (1830–1831)

I Class (none awarded)
II Class (1 awarded):
• General Jan Skrzynecki (for the battles of Wawer and Dębe Wielkie)
III Class (105 awarded)
IV Class (1794 awarded) e.g. Antoni Patek

V Class (1963 awarded)

In 1815 at the Congress of Vienna, when European powers reorganised Europe following the Napoleonic wars, the Kingdom of Poland—known unofficially as the "Congress Poland"—was created. This state, with a tenth the area of the Polish–Lithuanian Commonwealth and a fifth of its population, was now tied to Russia in a personal union. In Congress Poland, the Virtuti Militari medal was renamed the "Polish Military Medal" (Medal Wojskowy Polski). Both the statutes of Virtuti Militari and privileges granted to recipients were preserved. A special commission was created to award the Virtuti Militari to veterans of the Napoleonic campaigns of 1812, 1813, and 1814. By 1820, an additional 1,213 crosses of all classes had been awarded. Also, on 5 June 1817, a royal decree ennobled all officers who received the Golden Cross.

At the time, the Kingdom of Poland was one of the few constitutional monarchies in Europe, with the Emperor of the Russian Empire as Polish king. The country was given one of the most liberal constitutions in nineteenth-century Europe, although it was very different from the Polish Constitution of 3rd May of the late Commonwealth. The Polish desire for freedom and respect for traditional privileges was a source of constant friction between the Poles and the Russians. The main problem was that the tsars, who had absolute power in Russia, similarly wanted no restrictions on their rule in Poland. Nicholas I of Russia decided in 1825 not to be crowned king of Poland, and he continued to limit Polish liberties. In response to repeated curtailment of Polish constitutional rights, the Polish parliament in 1830 deposed the Tsar as King of Poland. When the resultant November Uprising broke out, the Tsar reacted by sending in Russian troops.

Provisional chapter (1920)

• Gen. Józef Piłsudski, Józef Haller de Hallenburg
• Lt.Gen. Wacław Iwaszkiewicz
• Brig. Franciszek Latinik, Jan Romer, Edward Rydz
• Col. Mieczysław Kuliński, Stanisław Skrzyński
• Maj. Mieczysław Mackiewicz

• Capt. Andrzej Kopa, Adam Koc

After the outbreak of this uprising against Russia the Polish Sejm decreed, on 19 February 1831, that the decoration be restored to its original name, the "Order Virtuti Militari." Between 3 March and October that year 3,863 crosses were awarded. Recipients of the Silver Cross included three women:

- head surgeon of the 10th Line Infantry Regiment, Józefa Kluczycka
- surgeon's assistant in the 10th Line Infantry Regiment, Józefa Daniel Rostowska née Mazurkiewicz
- cadet in the 1st "Augustów" Cavalry Regiment, Bronisława Czarnowska

After the defeat of the uprising, Tsar Nicholas I abolished the decoration and banned its use. On 31 December 1831 it was replaced with the "Polish Sign of Honor" (Polski Znak Honorowy), an exact copy of the original cross but awarded only to Russians for services to the Tsarist authorities.

== Republic of Poland ==
Recipients (1920–1939)

I Class (6 awarded):
• Marshal of Poland Józef Piłsudski
• Ferdinand Foch (France)
• King of Romania Ferdinand I
• King of the Belgians Albert I
• King of Serbs, Croats and Slovenes Alexander I
• King of Italy Vittorio Emmanuele III
II Class (19 awarded):
• Field Marshals: Yasukata Oku (Japan)
• Kageaki Kawamura (Japan)
• Armando Diaz (Italy)
• Gen. Zygmunt Zieliński
• Stanisław Szeptycki
• Maxime Weygand (France)
• Lucjan Żeligowski
• John Pershing (United States)
• Duke of Aosta Emmanuele Filiberto (Italy)
• Gen.dyw. Edward Rydz
• Stanisław Haller de Hallenburg
• Jan Romer
• Kazimierz Sosnkowski
• Leonard Skierski
• Władysław Sikorski
• Wacław Iwaszkiewicz
• Duke of Torino Emmanuele Filiberto (Italy)
• Gen.bryg. Tadeusz Jordan-Rozwadowski
III Class (14 awarded)
• płk Stefan Dąb-Biernacki, ppłk Gustaw Paszkiewicz, Maj. Zygmunt Piasecki
• and 11 foreigners
IV Class (50 awarded)
• ppłk Gustaw Paszkiewicz, Kazimierz Rybicki, Stefan Dąb-Biernacki
• Maj. Zygmunt Piasecki
• rotm Stanisław Radziwiłł (posthumously)
• Sgt. Kazimierz Sipika, Stanisław Jakubowicz
• and 43 foreigners
Class V (8,300 awarded)
• Mieczyslaw Garsztka
• Stanislaw Jackowski
• Walery Sławek

• Including: 1,800 posthumously and 187 to foreigners

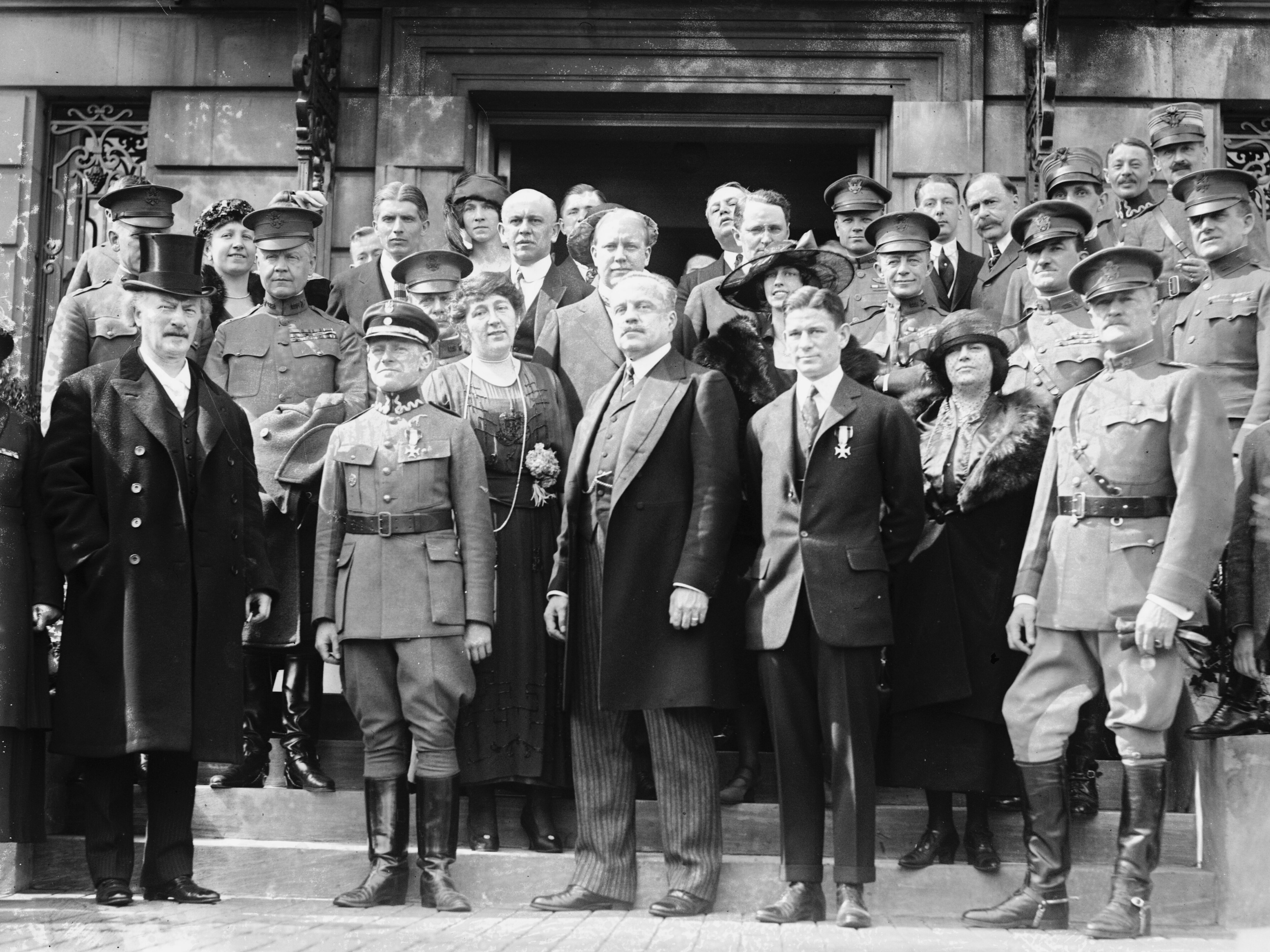
General John Pershing other officers receiving the Virtuti Militari by Prime Minister Ignacy Paderewski at the Polish embassy in Washington, D.C., on 14 March 1921

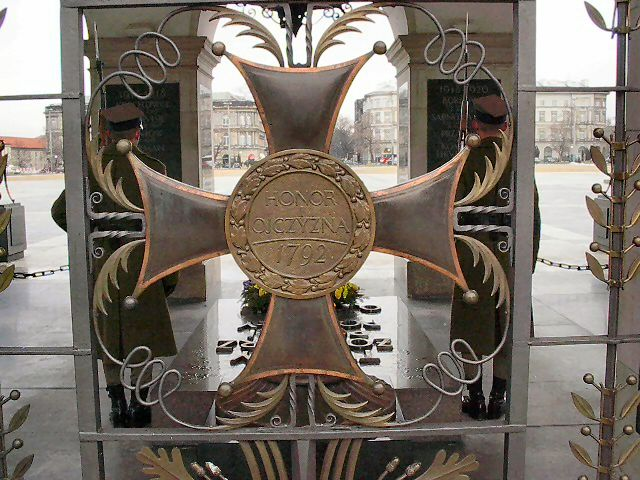
Order Wojenny Virtuti Militari Tomb of the Unknown Soldier, Warsaw

Poland regained its independence in 1918 as the Second Republic of Poland and the Polish Sejm reintroduced the Virtuti Militari on 1 August the following year under a new official name, the "Military Award Virtuti Militari" (Order Wojskowy Virtuti Militari). A new statute of the decoration was also passed, and the class system introduced under the Duchy of Warsaw was re-introduced. According to the new statute, crosses of each class could be awarded to a different class of soldiers and for various deeds:

- Grand Cross with Star, Class I: "for a commander who has achieved victory in a battle of strategic importance, resulting in total defeat of the enemy, or a successful defense that has decided the fate of a campaign."
- Commander's Cross, Class II: "for a commander who has achieved a notable tactical victory or a valorous and successful defense of a difficult position."
- Knight's Cross – Class III: for officers, NCOs, and ordinary soldiers, previously awarded the Golden Cross, for acts of outstanding bravery, risk of life or outstanding command over his troops.
- Golden Cross – Class IV: for officers who commanded their troops with outstanding bravery and valor, and for NCOs and ordinary soldiers, previously awarded the Silver Cross, for acts of outstanding bravery and risk of life on the field of battle.
- Silver Cross – Class V: for officers, NCOs, and ordinary soldiers, for acts of outstanding bravery and risk of life on the field of battle.

Each recipient of the Virtuti Militari, regardless of rank or post, received a yearly salary of 300 złoty.

Other privileges included the right of pre-emption when buying a state-owned land property or applying for a state post. Children of recipients received additional points during examinations in state schools and universities. Additionally, recipients of the Virtuti Militari had a right to be saluted by other soldiers of equal rank and NCOs, and ordinary soldiers could be promoted to the next higher rank upon receiving the award.

Coat-of-arms of city of Lwów, with Virtuti Militari pendent

The new Chapter of the decoration (Kapituła Orderu Virtuti Militari) was comprised twelve recipients of the crosses, four from each class from I to IV. The head of the chapter was Marshal of Poland Józef Piłsudski, the only living Pole awarded the Grand Cross with Star. As commander-in-chief of the Polish Army, he could award medals of Classes I to III with the consent of the Chapter, and Classes IV and V upon receiving an application from the commander of a division or brigade. The Polish national feast day of 3 May was chosen as the feast day of the Virtuti Militari.

On 1 January 1920 Józef Piłsudski awarded the first crosses to eleven members of a Provisional Chapter. On 22 January 1920, to commemorate the anniversary of the outbreak of the January Uprising, the first soldiers and officers were officially decorated with the Virtuti Militari for their deeds during World War I and the Polish-Ukrainian War. By 1923, when the award of new medals was halted, the Chapter had awarded crosses to 6,589 recipients. Most of the recipients were veterans of the Polish-Bolshevik War, but among them were also the veterans of all wars in which Polish soldiers fought in the twentieth century, as well as some veterans of the January Uprising. Among the recipients of the Silver Cross were two cities, Lwów and Verdun, as well as the banners of fourteen infantry regiments, six cavalry regiments, an engineer battalion, a Women's Auxiliary Service unit, and twelve artillery units.

A new Chapter was chosen for times of peace on 24 November 1922. The following year, the last decoration of the Virtuti Militari was granted for World War I and the Polish-Bolshevik War, and further awards were halted. On 25 March 1933 the Sejm passed a new "Order of Virtuti Militari Act" (Ustawa o Orderze Virtuti Militari); this modified the shape of all the crosses and extended the privileges granted to recipients by the act of 1919. All recipients of the decoration had the right to buy railway tickets at 20% of their normal prices. The state paid for the medical care of recipients and was obliged to provide each with a job that would enable him to "live a decent life". The government was ordered to provide money, food, and clothing to war invalids for the rest of their lives. Finally, the annual salary of 300 złotys was freed from taxes and could not be impounded by the courts.

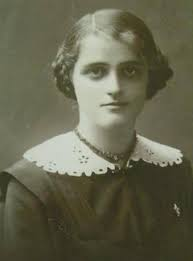
Wartime nurse Teresa Grodzińska, the first woman in the Second Polish Republic to receive Virtuti Militari.

Also, the criteria for granting the crosses became more strict:

- Grand Cross – Class I: for the commander-in-chief who won a war or, alternatively, for commanders of armies or fronts who achieved outstanding victories during various campaigns of the war.
- Commander's Cross – Class II: for the commander of an army or front (under special circumstances, also the commander of a group, division, or brigade) for brave and daring command during an operation which had important influence on the outcome of the war, or for other officers who contributed to the victory.
- Knight's Cross – Class III: for commanders of units up to the size of an army, for their outstanding leadership, initiative, or bravery; alternatively, for staff officers for their co-operation with their commanders that led to the final victory in a battle or war.
- Golden Cross – Class IV: for a soldier or officer, who was previously awarded the Silver Cross and achieved outstanding success on the battlefield thanks to his personal bravery or outstanding command of a division or a smaller unit.
- Silver Cross – Class V: for commanders who exercised daring and valorous command over their troops, or for ordinary soldiers who influenced their comrades in arms by their bravery, thus adding to the final victory in a battle.

The Silver Cross could also be awarded to military units, cities and civilians. All classes of the Virtuti Militari medal were awarded by the commander-in-chief during the war or former commander-in-chief after the end of hostilities. Classes I to III were awarded after nomination by the Chapter; Classes IV and V were nominated through the chain of command (usually by the commander of a division or brigade). Apart from the twelve members of the Chapter, all recipients of Class I had a right to take part in the voting.

== World War II ==
Recipients (1939–1945) (Exile)

II Class (3 awarded):
• Lt General Władysław Anders
• Lt General Tadeusz Bór-Komorowski
• Brigadier General Michał Karaszewicz-Tokarzewski
III Class (6 awarded)
• Lt General Władysław Anders
• Lt General Stanisław Maczek
• Brigadier General Bronisław Duch
• Lt General Tadeusz Kutrzeba
• Brigadier General Franciszek Kleeberg
• Brigadier General Antoni Chruściel
IV Class (201 awarded)
V Class (5363 awarded)
• Brigadier General Wilhelm Orlik-Rueckemann
• Commander Bolesław Trzaskowski

• City of Warsaw for Heroic defence in 1939

During the Polish Defensive War of 1939, the fast German and Soviet advance (Polish territory was overrun by its enemies in five weeks from the beginning of the invasion) prevented the Chapter from awarding the medals. Instead, commanders of divisions and brigades usually rewarded the bravery of their soldiers with their own crosses received before the war. This was the case of the 18th Pomeranian Uhlan Regiment, awarded the Virtuti Militari of General Stanisław Grzmot-Skotnicki after the battle of Krojanty, where elements of the regiment successfully delayed the advance of the German infantry on 1 September, the first day of the Second World War.

Following the fall of Poland in 1939, much of the Polish Army was evacuated to France, where it was reconstructed under the command of General Władysław Sikorski. In January 1941, the Polish Government in Exile introduced the Virtuti Militari as the highest military decoration of the Polish Army in exile. The legal basis for the election of a new Chapter was the Act of 1933. During the Second World War, the Virtuti Militari was also often bestowed to senior military officers of allied armies, including British General Bernard Montgomery; the American Supreme Commander of the Allied forces, Dwight D. Eisenhower; French General Jean de Lattre de Tassigny; Soviet Marshal Georgy Zhukov; and Serbian guerrilla leader Draža Mihailović.

Among the most famous recipients of the medal during this period were Tadeusz Kutrzeba, creator of the Bzura counterattack plan and participant in the defence of Warsaw during the Invasion of Poland; Władysław Anders, commander of the 2nd Polish Corps; Tadeusz Bór-Komorowski, commander of the large Armia Krajowa resistance movement and leader of the Warsaw Uprising; and Stanisław Maczek, one of the best armor commanders of the war, who devised the first anti-blitzkrieg strategy as early as 1940 and was the commander of the 10th Motorized Cavalry Brigade, considered to be the only Polish unit not to have lost a single battle in 1939, and from 1942 the commander of the First Polish Armoured Division.

== People's Republic of Poland ==
Recipients (1943–1990) PRL

I Class (13 awarded):
• Marshal of the USSR and Marshal of Poland Konstanty Rokossowski
• Marshal Michał Rola-Żymierski
• General Aleksei Antonov
• Marshal Leonid Brezhnev (revoked 1990)
• Marshal of Yugoslavia Josip Broz Tito
• Major General Nikolai Bulganin
• Marshal Andriey Grechko
• Marshal Ivan Koniev
• Marshal Alexander Vasilievski
• Marshal Georgy Zhukov
• Field Marshal Bernard Montgomery
• General Ludvík Svoboda
• General Karol Świerczewski (posthumous)
II Class (18 awarded):
• Lt General Stanisław Popławski
• Lt General Juliusz Rómmel
• Lt General Karol Świerczewski
• Major Henryk Sucharski
III Class (57 awarded)
• Lt General Sarkis Martirosyan
• Lt General Bolesław Kieniewicz
• Lt General Władysław Korczyc
• Lt General Marian Spychalski
IV Class (227 awarded)
• Captain Władysław Raginis (posthumous)

V Class (4852 awarded)

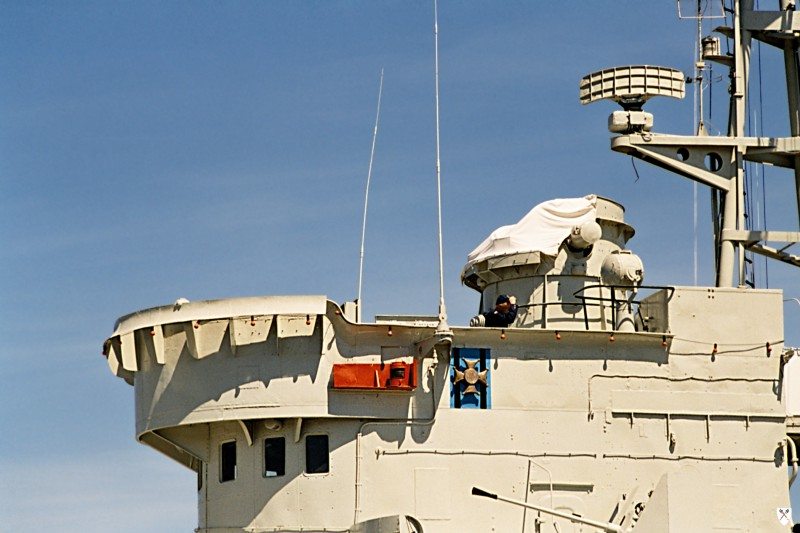
Bridge of ORP Błyskawica decorated with Order Wojenny Virtuti Militari IV Class.

The Soviet-backed Polish Armies fighting on the Eastern Front were also awarding the Virtuti Militari. On 11 November 1943 General Zygmunt Berling awarded Silver Crosses to sixteen veterans of the Battle of Lenino. On 22 December 1944 the Soviet-backed Polish Committee of National Liberation passed a "Virtuti Militari Award Act", which accepted the medal as the highest military decoration of both the 1st Polish Army of the Red Army and the Armia Ludowa resistance organization.

Although the decree of the Polish Committee of National Liberation was loosely based on the act of the Polish Sejm of 1933, the exclusive right to award the decoration to soldiers was granted to the Home National Council. In 1947 the right passed to the President of Poland, then to the Polish Council of State after that body replaced the presidency. Between 1943 and 1989, the Communist authorities of the People's Republic of Poland awarded the medal to 5,167 people and organisations. Some of the crosses were given to the officers and leaders of the Red Army and of other armies allied with the Soviet Union during and after World War II.

Among the recipients of the Golden Cross (Class IV) was destroyer ORP Błyskawica, probably the only warship in the world to be awarded the highest-ranking national medal. Błyskawica Recipients of Class V of the Virtuti Militari included military units, including two infantry divisions, six infantry regiments, three artillery regiments, four tank regiments, three air force regiments, as well as smaller units.

== Republic of Poland (after 1989) ==
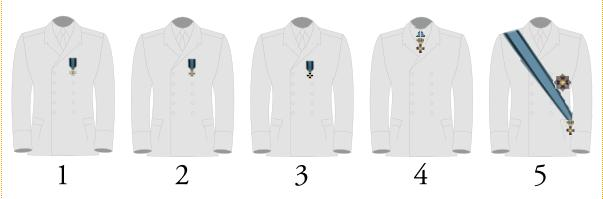
1 – Silver Cross, 2 – Gold Cross, 3 – Knight's Cross, 4 – Commander's Cross, 5 – Grand Cross

After Poland overthrew the Communist rule in 1989, a number of Virtuti Militari awards made by the communist authorities were brought into question. On 10 July 1990, President Wojciech Jaruzelski revoked the Grand Cross given to Leonid Brezhnev on 21 July 1974. On 16 October 1992, the Polish Sejm passed a new Virtuti Militari Act, which is based on the act of 1933. It restored the Chapter of Virtuti Militari abolished by the communist authorities, while also confirming all decorations bestowed by both the Polish government in exile and the Soviet-backed authorities in Poland.

In 1995, President Lech Wałęsa revoked the Order given to Ivan Serov, who was accused of being responsible for the deaths of thousands of Poles. In 2006, President Lech Kaczyński revoked the Cross of the Order given to Wincenty Romanowski, who had tortured anti-Communist resistance fighters.

Since 1989 there have been no new awards of the Virtuti Militari, and a new act of parliament introduced a rule setting the final deadline for awards at "no later than five years after the cessation of hostilities."

In wartime, the President of the Republic of Poland could award the OWVM for heroism in battle.

== See also ==
- Recipients of the Virtuti Militari
- Polish Scouting Cross
- Polish awards and decorations
- List of military decorations
