= Gózdek, Radom County =

Gózdek
- Village
- Location within Poland
- Coordinates: 51°30′N 21°4′E
- Country: Poland
- Voivodeship: Masovian
- County: Radom
- Gmina: Zakrzew

Gózdek [ˈɡuzdɛk] is a village in the administrative district of Gmina Zakrzew, within Radom County, Masovian Voivodeship, in east-central Poland.
