= Nieczatów =

- Village
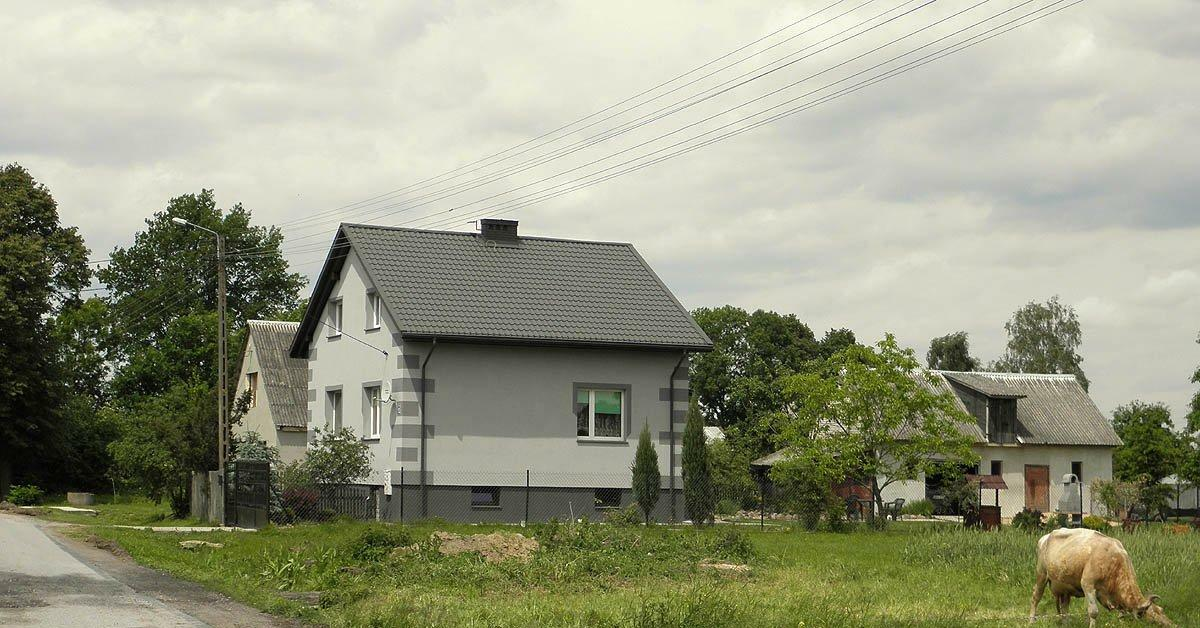
- One of the newer buildings in the village of Nieczatów

- Location within Poland
- Coordinates: 51°26′15″N 21°03′13″E
- Country: Poland
- Voivodeship: Masovian
- County: Radom
- Gmina: Zakrzew

Nieczatów [ɲɛˈt͡ʂatuf] is a village in the administrative district of Gmina Zakrzew, within Radom County, Masovian Voivodeship, in east-central Poland.
