= Czortowice =

- Village
- Location within Poland
- Coordinates: 50°51′40″N 23°51′45″E
- Country: Poland
- Voivodeship: Lublin
- County: Hrubieszów
- Gmina: Hrubieszów
- Elevation: 220 m (720 ft)
- Population: 109

Czortowice [t͡ʂɔrtɔˈvʲit͡sɛ] is a village in the administrative district of Gmina Hrubieszów, within Hrubieszów County, Lublin Voivodeship, in eastern Poland, close to the border with Ukraine.
