= Zakrzew-Kolonia, Lublin Voivodeship =

Coordinates: 50.8872°N 22.5999°E

Zakrzew-Kolonia
- Colony
- Location within Poland
- Country: Poland
- Voivodeship: Lublin Voivodeship
- County: Lublin County
- Gmina: Zakrzew

Zakrzew-Kolonia [ˈzakʂɛf kɔˈlɔɲa] is a colony in the administrative district of Gmina Zakrzew, within Lublin County, Lublin Voivodeship, in eastern Poland.
