= Zakrzew-Kolonia, Masovian Voivodeship =

Village in east-central Poland

Zakrzew-Kolonia
- Village
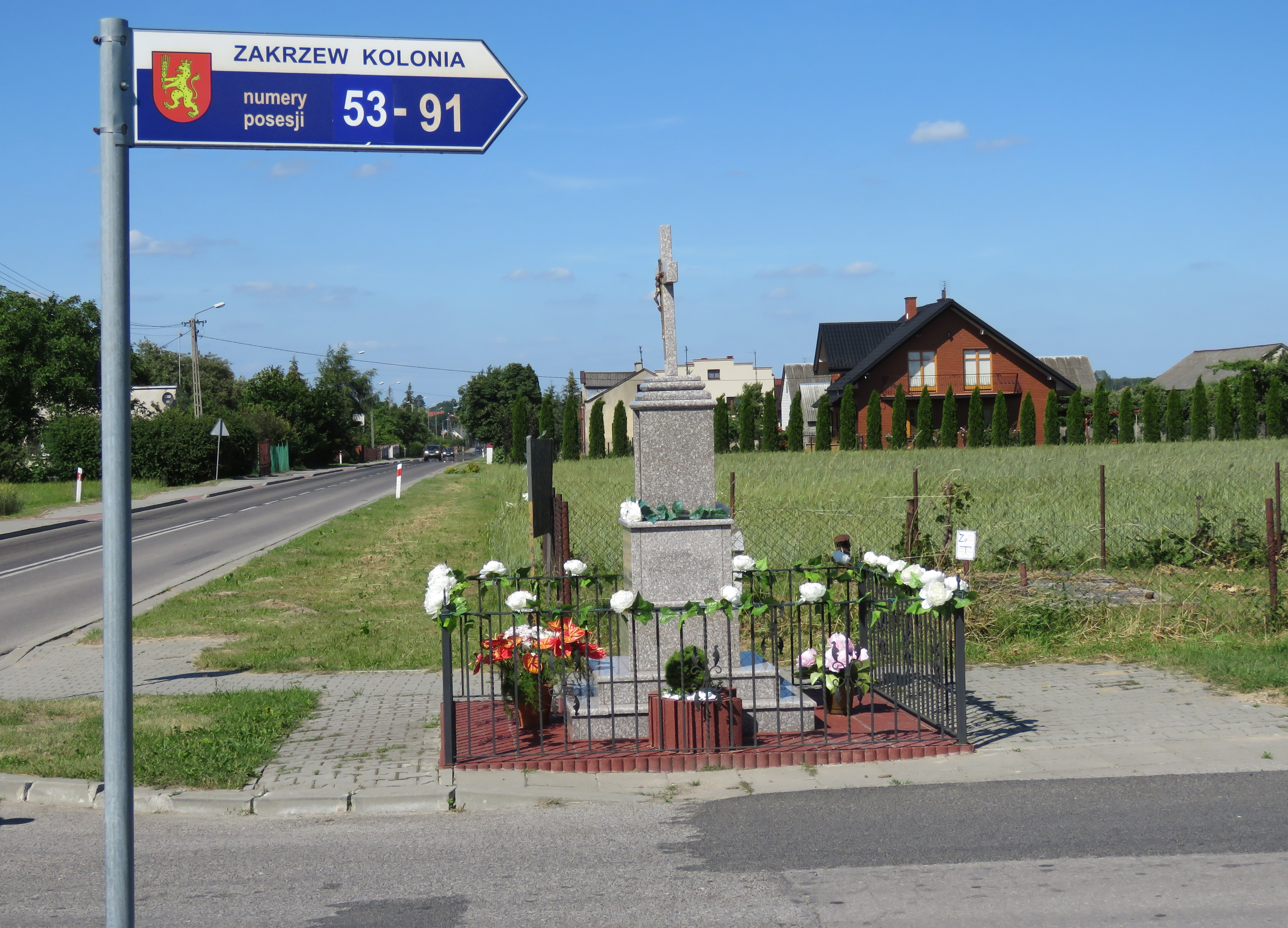

- Location within Poland
- Coordinates: 51°25′50″N 20°59′22″E
- Country: Poland
- Voivodeship: Masovian
- County: Radom
- Gmina: Zakrzew

Zakrzew-Kolonia [ˈzakʂɛf kɔˈlɔɲa] is a village in the administrative district of Gmina Zakrzew, within Radom County, Masovian Voivodeship, in east-central Poland.
