= Zakrzew, Radom County =

Zakrzew
- Village
- Location within Poland
- Coordinates: 51°27′N 21°1′E
- Country: Poland
- Voivodeship: Masovian
- County: Radom
- Gmina: Zakrzew

Zakrzew [ˈzakʂɛf] is a village in Radom County, Masovian Voivodeship, in east-central Poland. It is the seat of the gmina (administrative district) called Gmina Zakrzew.
