= Jaszowice, Masovian Voivodeship =

Jaszowice
- Village
- Location within Poland
- Coordinates: 51°25′15″N 20°57′32″E
- Country: Poland
- Voivodeship: Masovian
- County: Radom
- Gmina: Zakrzew

Jaszowice [jaʂɔˈvit͡sɛ] is a village in the administrative district of Gmina Zakrzew, within Radom County, Masovian Voivodeship, in east-central Poland.
