= Gmina Zakrzew, Lublin County =

Gmina Zakrzew Zakrzew Commune
- Gmina
- Interactive map of Gmina Zakrzew
- Coordinates (Zakrzew): 50°53′22″N 22°35′27″E
- Country: Poland
- Voivodeship: Lublin
- County: Lublin County
- Seat: Zakrzew

Area
  - Total: 75.38 km^{2} (29.10 sq mi)

Population (2019)
  - Total: 2,880
  - Density: 38.2/km^{2} (99.0/sq mi)
- Website: http://www.zakrzew.lubelskie.pl

Gmina Zakrzew is a rural gmina (administrative district) in Lublin County, Lublin Voivodeship, in eastern Poland. Its seat is the village of Zakrzew, which lies approximately 40 kilometres (25 mi) south of the regional capital Lublin.

The gmina covers an area of 75.38 square kilometres (29.1 sq mi), and as of 2006 its total population is 2,880 (2,980 in 2013).

== Villages ==
Gmina Zakrzew contains the villages and settlements of Annów, Baraki, Boża Wola, Dębina, Karolin, Majdan Starowiejski, Nikodemów, Ponikwy, Szklarnia, Targowisko, Targowisko-Kolonia, Tarnawka Druga, Tarnawka Pierwsza, Wólka Ponikiewska, Zakrzew and Zakrzew-Kolonia.

== Neighbouring gminas ==
Gmina Zakrzew is bordered by the gminas of Batorz, Bychawa, Chrzanów, Godziszów, Turobin, Wysokie and Zakrzówek.
