= Gmina Zakrzew, Masovian Voivodeship =

Gmina Zakrzew Zakrzew Commune
- Gmina
- Flag Coat of arms
- Interactive map of Gmina Zakrzew
- Coordinates (Zakrzew): 51°27′N 21°1′E
- Country: Poland
- Voivodeship: Masovian
- County: Radom County
- Seat: Zakrzew

Area
  - Total: 96.15 km^{2} (37.12 sq mi)

Population (2006)
  - Total: 11,189
  - Density: 116.4/km^{2} (301.4/sq mi)
- Website: http://www.zakrzew.pl

Gmina Zakrzew is a rural gmina (administrative district) in Radom County, Masovian Voivodeship, in east-central Poland. Its seat is the village of Zakrzew, which lies approximately 11 kilometres (7 mi) north-west of Radom and 88 kilometres (54 mi) south of Warsaw.

The gmina covers an area of 96.15 square kilometres (37.1 sq mi) and as of 2006 its total population is 11,189.

== Villages ==
Gmina Zakrzew contains the villages and settlements of Bielicha, Cerekiew, Dąbrówka Nagórna-Wieś, Dąbrówka Podłężna, Golędzin, Gózdek, Gulin, Gulinek, Gustawów, Janiszew, Jaszowice, Kozia Wola, Kozinki, Legęzów, Milejowice, Mleczków, Natalin, Nieczatów, Podlesie Mleczkowskie, Taczów, Taczowskie Pieńki, Wacyn, Wola Taczowska, Zakrzew, Zakrzew-Kolonia, Zakrzew-Las, Zakrzewska Wola, Zatopolice and Zdziechów.

== Neighbouring gminas ==
Gmina Zakrzew is bordered by the city of Radom and by the gminas of Jedlińsk, Przytyk, Stara Błotnica and Wolanów.
