= Zakrzew, Lublin County =

Zakrzew
- Village
- Location within Poland
- Coordinates: 50°53′22″N 22°35′27″E
- Country: Poland
- Voivodeship: Lublin Voivodeship
- County: Lublin County
- Gmina: Zakrzew
- Website: http://zakrzew.lubelskie.pl

Zakrzew [ˈzakʂɛf] is a village in Lublin County, Lublin Voivodeship, in eastern Poland. It is the seat of the gmina (administrative district) called Gmina Zakrzew. It lies approximately 40 km (25 mi) south of the regional capital Lublin.
