= Brzeziny (disambiguation) =

Brzeziny may refer to the following places in Poland:

- Brzeziny, a suburb of Olsztyn
- Brzeziny, Kalisz County in Greater Poland Voivodeship (west-central Poland)
- Brzeziny, Kościan County in Greater Poland Voivodeship (west-central Poland)
- Brzeziny, Gmina Środa Wielkopolska, Środa County in Greater Poland Voivodeship (west-central Poland)
- Brzeziny, Kuyavian-Pomeranian Voivodeship (north-central Poland)
- Brzeziny, Brzeziny County in Łódź Voivodeship (central Poland)
- Brzeziny, Kutno County in Łódź Voivodeship (central Poland)
- Brzeziny, Poddębice County in Łódź Voivodeship (central Poland)
- Brzeziny, Radomsko County in Łódź Voivodeship (central Poland)
- Brzeziny, Gmina Rzeczyca in Łódź Voivodeship (central Poland)
- Brzeziny, Gmina Mokrsko in Łódź Voivodeship (central Poland)
- Brzeziny, Gmina Skomlin in Łódź Voivodeship (central Poland)
- Brzeziny, Wieruszów County in Łódź Voivodeship (central Poland)
- Brzeziny, Biłgoraj County in Lublin Voivodeship (east Poland)
- Brzeziny, Chełm County in Lublin Voivodeship (east Poland)
- Brzeziny, Janów County in Lublin Voivodeship (east Poland)
- Brzeziny, Krasnystaw County in Lublin Voivodeship (east Poland)
- Brzeziny, Łęczna County in Lublin Voivodeship (east Poland)
- Brzeziny, Lubartów County in Lublin Voivodeship (east Poland)
- Brzeziny, Radzyń County in Lublin Voivodeship (east Poland)
- Brzeziny, Ryki County in Lublin Voivodeship (east Poland)
- Brzeziny, Gmina Lubycza Królewska in Lublin Voivodeship (east Poland)
- Brzeziny, Gostynin County in Masovian Voivodeship (east-central Poland)
- Brzeziny, Mińsk County in Masovian Voivodeship (east-central Poland)
- Brzeziny, Radom County in Masovian Voivodeship (east-central Poland)
- Brzeziny, Warsaw in Masovian Voivodeship (east-central Poland)
- Brzeziny, Nysa County in Opole Voivodeship (south-west Poland)
- Brzeziny, Olesno County in Opole Voivodeship (south-west Poland)
- Brzeziny, Podkarpackie Voivodeship (south-east Poland)
- Brzeziny, Podlaskie Voivodeship (north-east Poland)
- Brzeziny, Pomeranian Voivodeship (north Poland)
- Brzeziny, Kłobuck County in Silesian Voivodeship (south Poland)
- Brzeziny, Myszków County in Silesian Voivodeship (south Poland)
- Brzeziny, Zawiercie County in Silesian Voivodeship (south Poland)
- Brzeziny, Kielce County in Świętokrzyskie Voivodeship (south-central Poland)
- Brzeziny, Staszów County in Świętokrzyskie Voivodeship (south-central Poland)
- Brzeziny, Warmian-Masurian Voivodeship (north Poland)
- Brzeziny, West Pomeranian Voivodeship (north-west Poland)
