= Długa Kościelna =

- Village
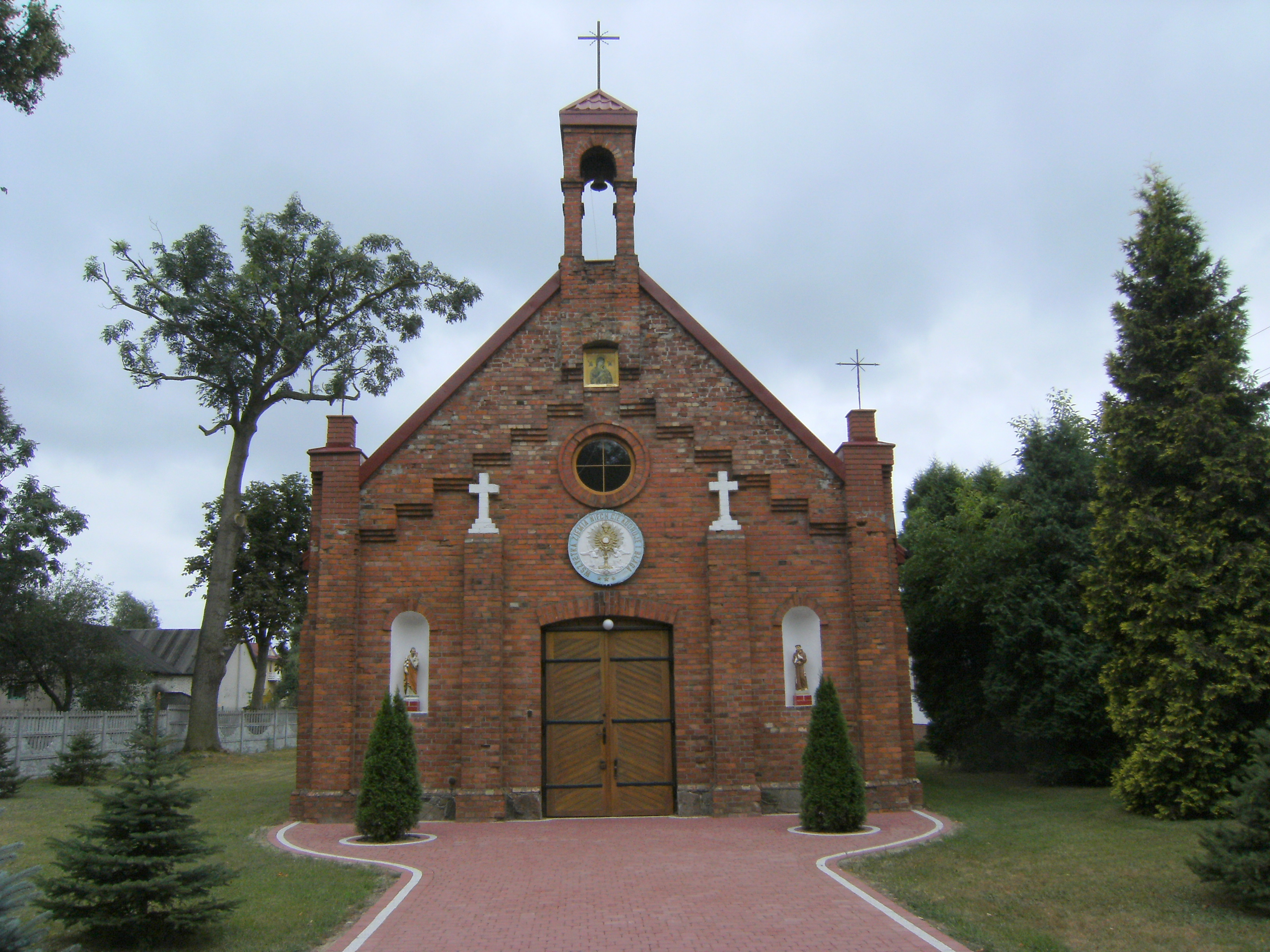
- Blessed Sacrament church in Długa Kościelna

- Location within Poland
- Coordinates: 52°14′N 21°21′E
- Country: Poland
- Voivodeship: Masovian
- County: Mińsk
- Gmina: Halinów
- Population: 723
- Time zone: UTC+1 (CET)
  - Summer (DST): UTC+2 (CEST)
- Vehicle registration: WM

Długa Kościelna [ˈdwuɡa kɔɕˈt͡ɕɛlna] is a village in the administrative district of Gmina Halinów, within Mińsk County, Masovian Voivodeship, in east-central Poland. It borders the town of Halinów in the south and lies approximately 16 km (10 mi) west of Mińsk Mazowiecki and 24 km (15 mi) east of Warsaw.

There are two churches and parishes in the village: the Catholic Saint Anne church and the Catholic Mariavite Blessed Sacrament church.
