= Kazimierów, Masovian Voivodeship =

Kazimierów
- Village
- Location within Poland
- Coordinates: 52°14′12″N 21°22′00″E
- Country: Poland
- Voivodeship: Masovian
- County: Mińsk
- Gmina: Halinów
- Population: 440

Kazimierów [kaʑiˈmjɛruf] is a village in the administrative district of Gmina Halinów, within Mińsk County, Masovian Voivodeship, in East-Central Poland.
