= Kieszek =

- Village
- Location within Poland
- Coordinates: 51°28′N 21°21′E
- Country: Poland
- Voivodeship: Masovian
- County: Radom
- Gmina: Pionki
- Population: 160

Kieszek [ˈkʲɛʂɛk] is a village in the administrative district of Gmina Pionki, within Radom County, Masovian Voivodeship, in east-central Poland.
