= Działki Suskowolskie =

- Village
- Location within Poland
- Coordinates: 51°28′07″N 21°28′21″E
- Country: Poland
- Voivodeship: Masovian
- County: Radom
- Gmina: Pionki

Działki Suskowolskie [ˈd͡ʑau̯ki suskɔˈvɔlskʲɛ] is a village in the administrative district of Gmina Pionki, within Radom County, Masovian Voivodeship, in eastern Poland.
