= Królewskie Brzeziny =

- Village
- Location within Poland
- Coordinates: 52°13′47″N 21°18′57″E
- Country: Poland
- Voivodeship: Masovian
- County: Mińsk
- Gmina: Halinów

Królewskie Brzeziny [kruˈlɛfskʲɛ bʐɛˈʑinɨ] is a village in the administrative district of Gmina Halinów, within Mińsk County, Masovian Voivodeship, in east-central Poland.
