= Kolonka =

- Village
- Location within Poland
- Coordinates: 51°26′42″N 21°19′51″E
- Country: Poland
- Voivodeship: Masovian
- County: Radom
- Gmina: Pionki

Kolonka [kɔˈlɔnka] is a village in the administrative district of Gmina Pionki, within Radom County, Masovian Voivodeship, in east-central Poland.

During the World War II in the Kolonka's forest was a guerrilla group of Armia Krajowa. Lieutenant "Longin" Dąbkowski and Stanisław Siczek "Jeleń" took the command of this group.

From 1945 to 1975 the village belonged to the former Kielce Voivodeship, and from 1975 to 1998 to the former Radom Voivodeship.

In Kolonka is the stadium of People's Sport Club "Jodła Jedlnia-Letnisko" (since 1949).

== Gallery ==
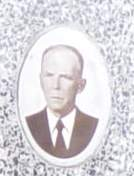
Stanisław Siczek, famous guerilla in Kolonka 1939-1945

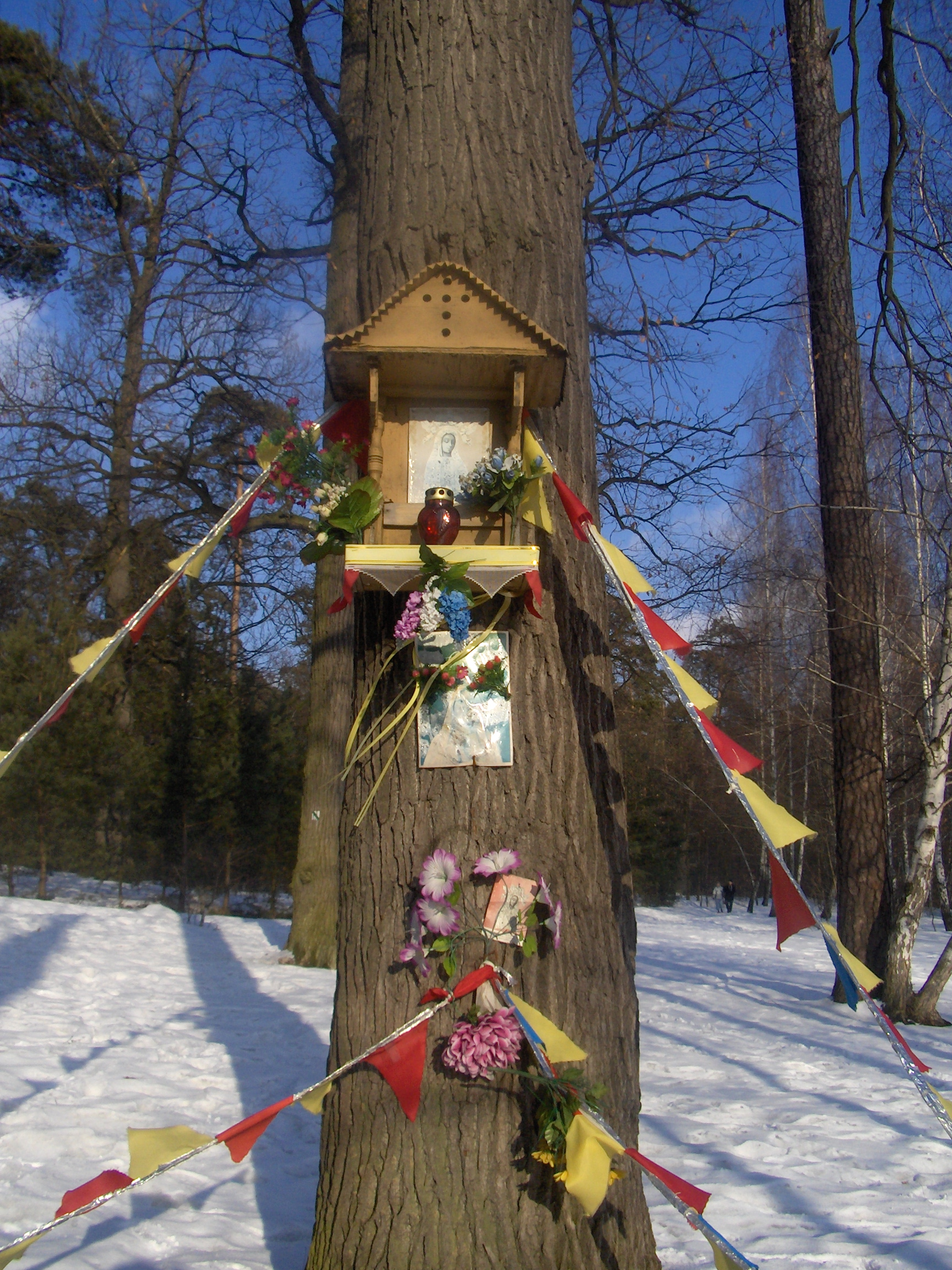
Chapel in Kolonka forest

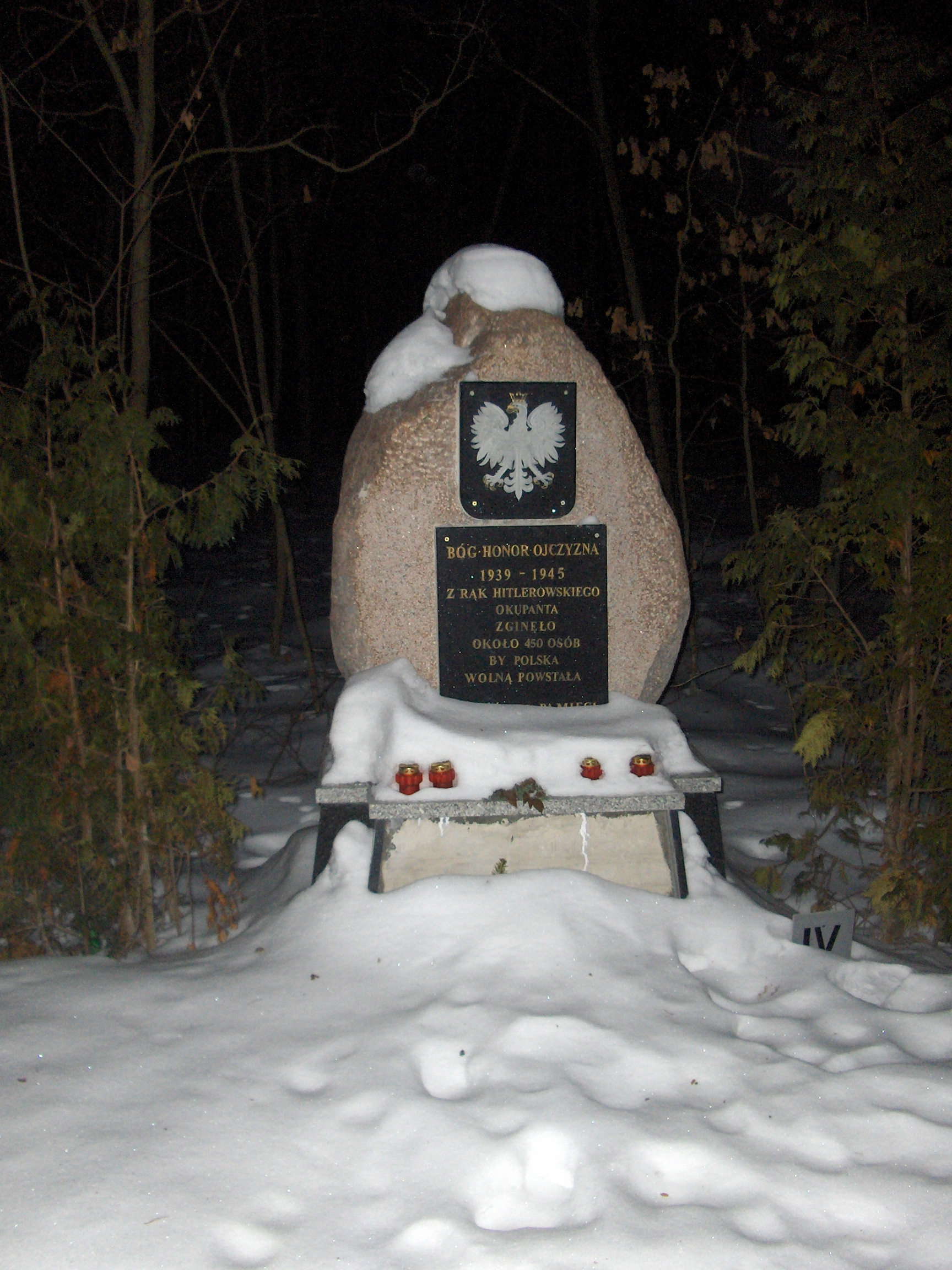
Commongrave 1939-1945 in Kolonka forest

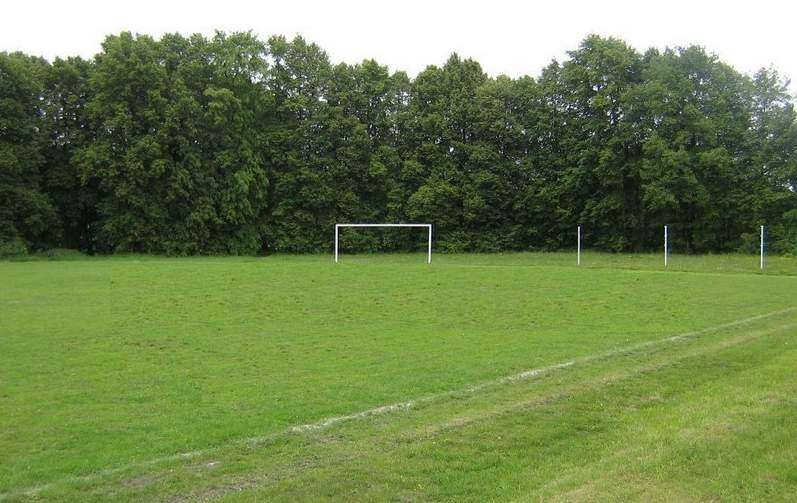
Stadium in Kolonka (People's Sport Club "Jodla Jedlnia-Letnisko")
