= Hipolitów, Mińsk County =

Hipolitów
- Village
- Location within Poland
- Coordinates: 52°13′N 21°20′E
- Country: Poland
- Voivodeship: Masovian
- County: Mińsk
- Gmina: Halinów
- Population (2013): 1,544

Hipolitów [xipɔˈlituf] is a village in the administrative district of Gmina Halinów, within Mińsk County, Masovian Voivodeship, in east-central Poland.
