= Józefin, Gmina Halinów =

Józefin
- Village
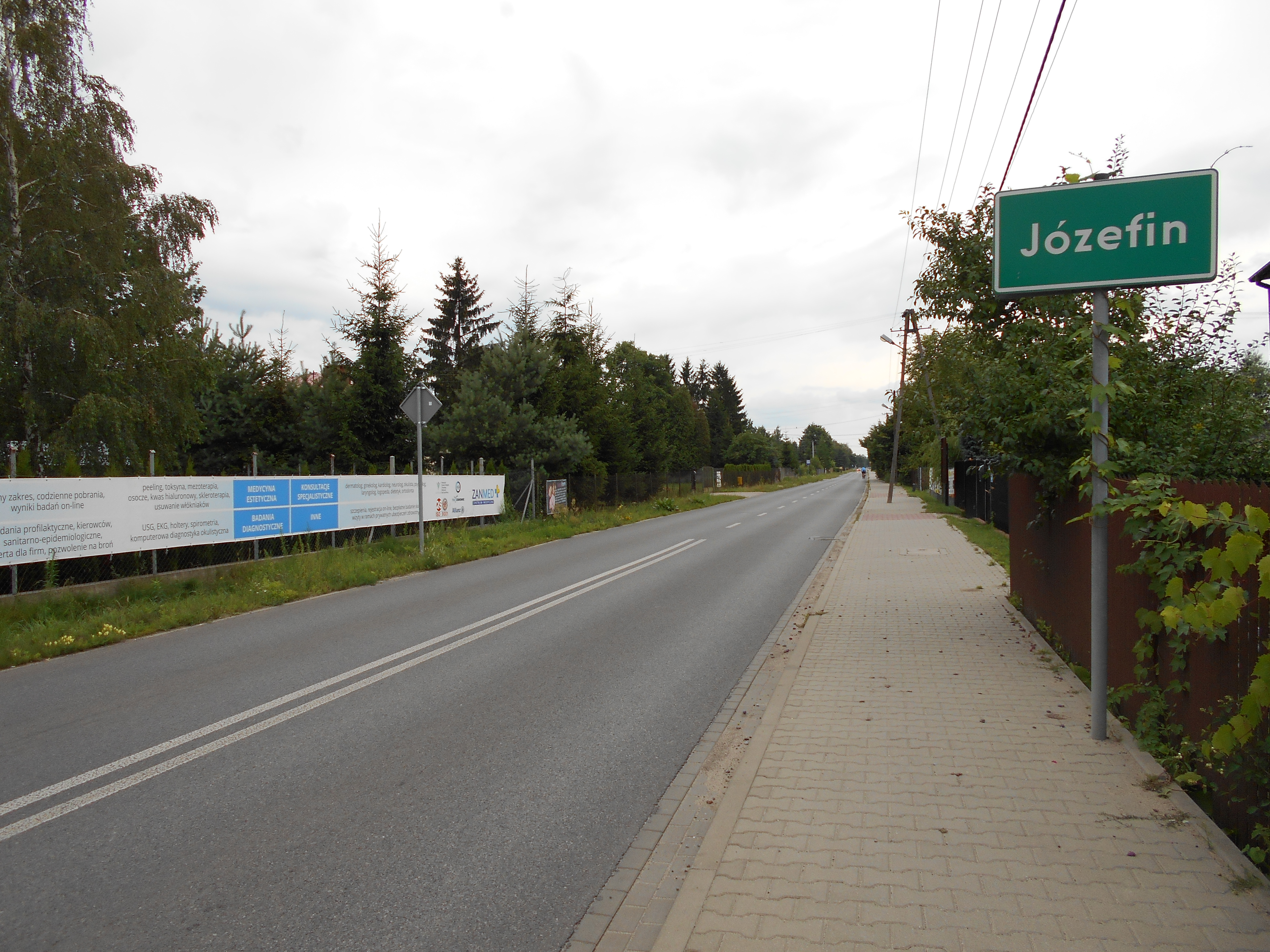
- Entrance to Józefin, Gmina Halinów

- Location within Poland
- Coordinates: 52°13′54″N 21°20′06″E
- Country: Poland
- Voivodeship: Masovian
- County: Mińsk
- Gmina: Halinów

Józefin [juˈzɛfin] is a village in the administrative district of Gmina Halinów, within Mińsk County, Masovian Voivodeship, in east-central Poland.
