= Jaroszki, Masovian Voivodeship =

Jaroszki
- Village
- Location within Poland
- Coordinates: 51°30′N 21°21′E
- Country: Poland
- Voivodeship: Masovian
- County: Radom
- Gmina: Pionki

Jaroszki [jaˈrɔʂki] is a village in the administrative district of Gmina Pionki, within Radom County, Masovian Voivodeship, in east-central Poland.
