= Czarna Wieś, Masovian Voivodeship =

Czarna Wieś
- Village
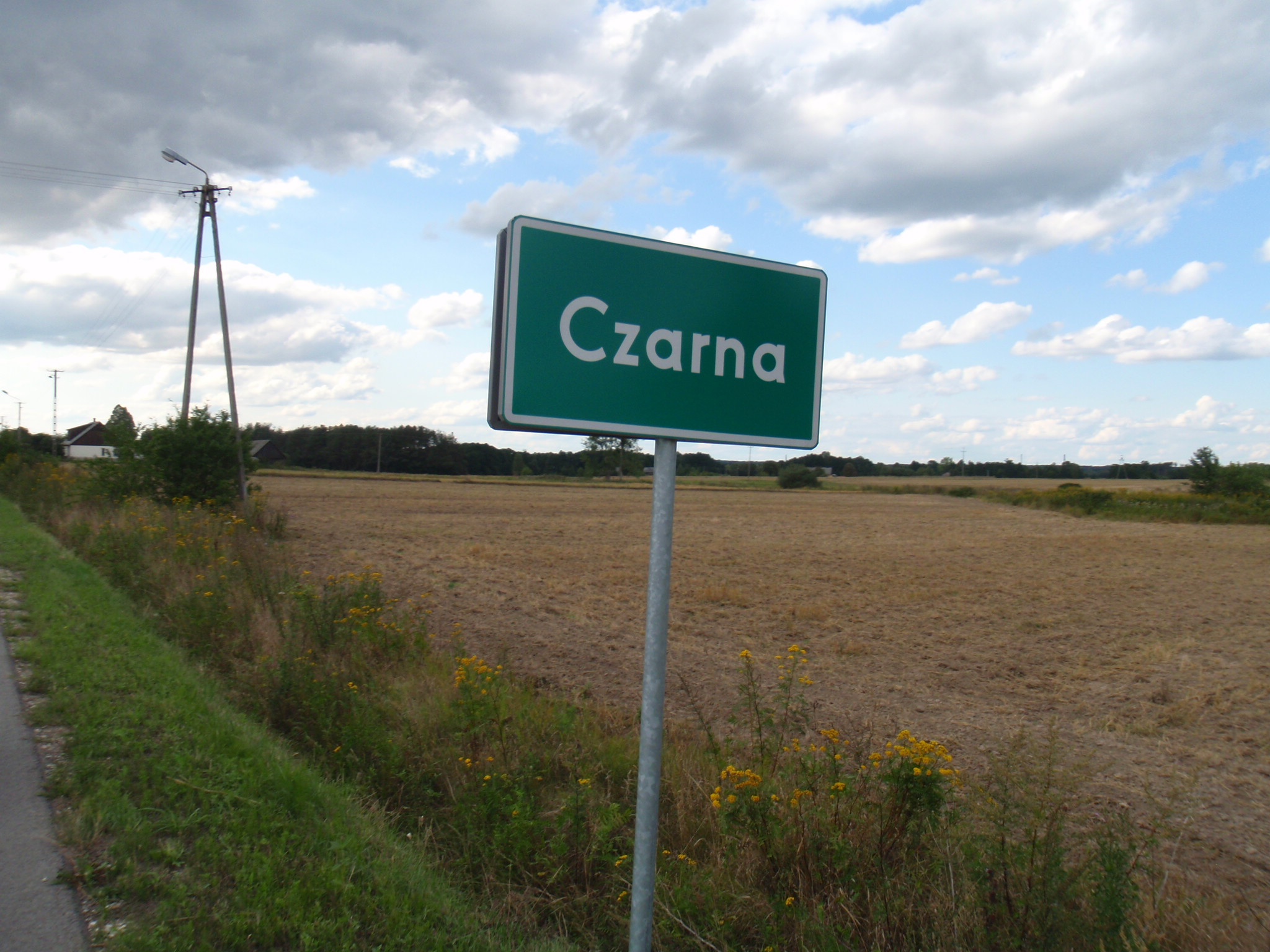
- Road sign in Czarna Wieś

- Location within Poland
- Coordinates: 51°25′37″N 21°26′27″E
- Country: Poland
- Voivodeship: Masovian
- County: Radom
- Gmina: Pionki

Czarna Wieś [ˈt͡ʂarna ˈvjɛɕ] is a village in the administrative district of Gmina Pionki, within Radom County, Masovian Voivodeship, in east-central Poland.
