= Mireń =

- Village
- Location within Poland
- Coordinates: 51°27′N 21°31′E
- Country: Poland
- Voivodeship: Masovian
- County: Radom
- Gmina: Pionki

Mireń [ˈmirɛɲ] is a village in the administrative district of Gmina Pionki, within Radom County, Masovian Voivodeship, in east-central Poland.
