= Cisie, Mińsk County =

Cisie
- Village
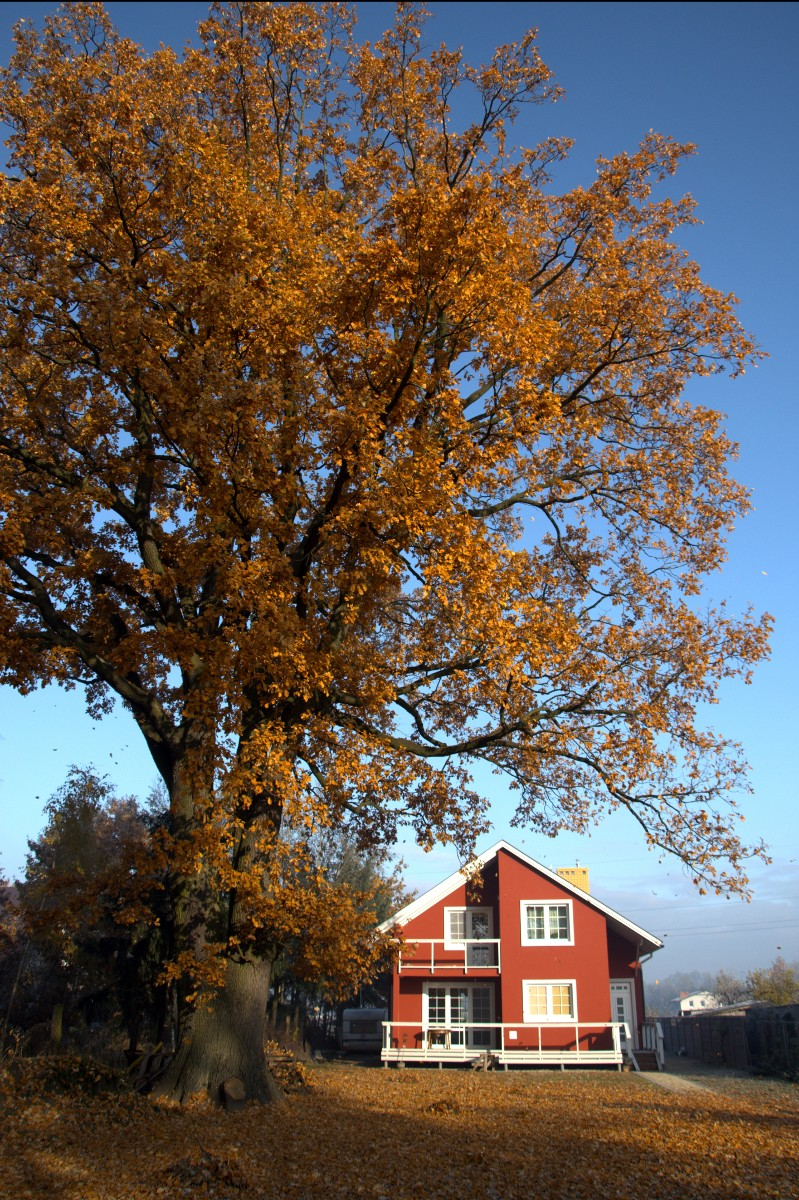
- Historic oak at Cisie

- Location within Poland
- Coordinates: 52°13′07″N 21°39′29″E
- Country: Poland
- Voivodeship: Masovian
- County: Mińsk
- Gmina: Halinów
- Population: 1,098

Cisie pronounced [ˈt͡ɕiɕe] is a village in the administrative district of Gmina Halinów, within Mińsk County, Masovian Voivodeship, in east-central Poland.

== World War II ==
Cisie is best known for its citizens' actions during the Holocaust in occupied Poland. The villagers helped hide a number of Polish Jews from Cegłów, as well as some who had escaped from trains en route to the Treblinka extermination camp. On June 28, 1943, raids were carried out on the village by the German military police from Mińsk Mazowiecki, during which 25 Poles were snatched from their homes, together with numerous Jews they sheltered. Jews and the Poles who had sheltered them were massacred, and the village burnt to the ground.
