= Stary Konik =

- Village
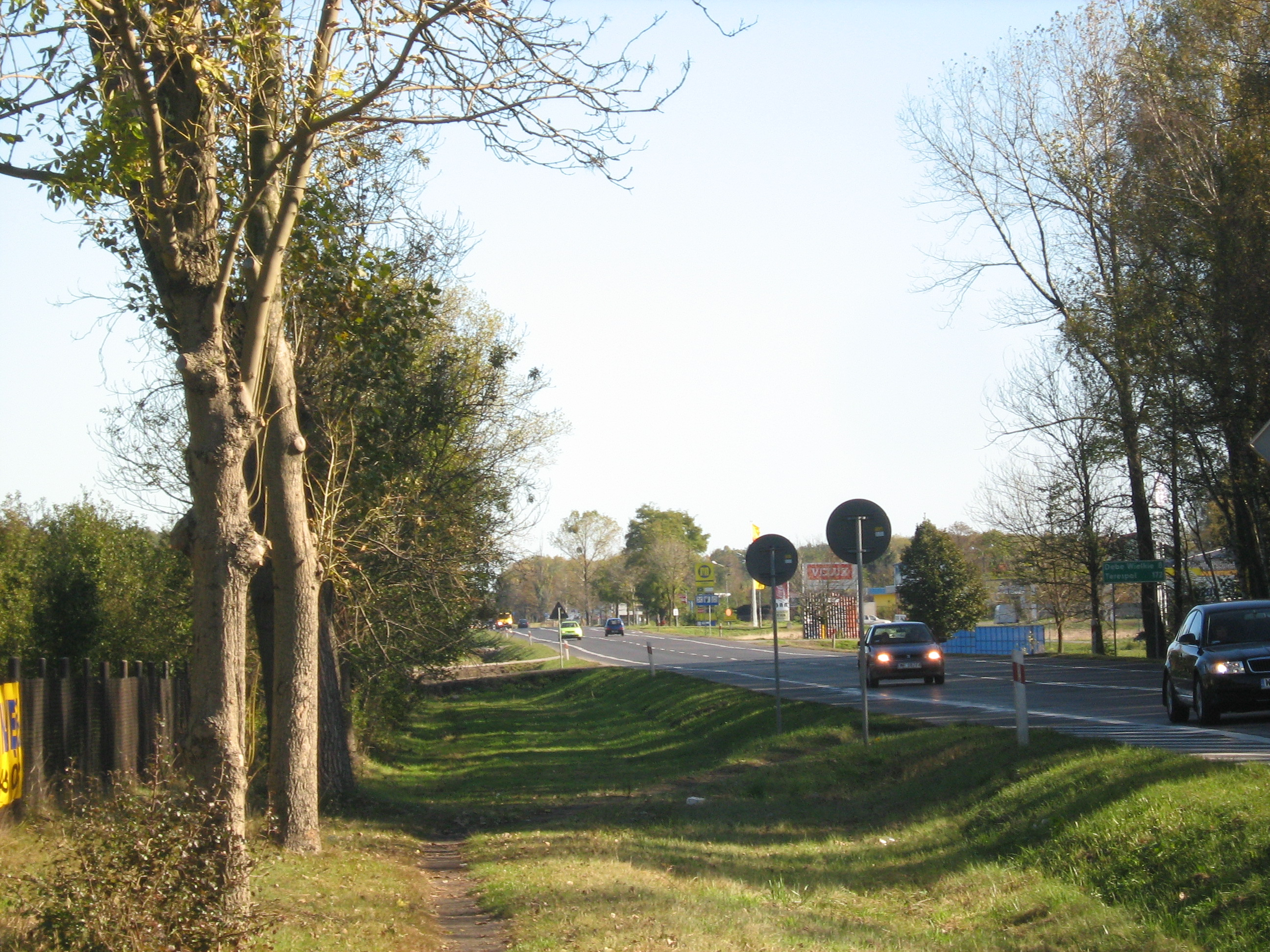
- View of a national road in Stary Konik

- Coat of arms

- Location within Poland
- Coordinates: 52°12′32″N 21°20′40″E
- Country: Poland
- Voivodeship: Masovian
- County: Mińsk
- Gmina: Halinów
- Population: 198

Stary Konik [ˈstarɨ ˈkɔnik] is a village in the administrative district of Gmina Halinów, within Mińsk County, Masovian Voivodeship, in east-central Poland.
