= Mrowiska =

- Village
- Location within Poland
- Coordinates: 52°14′N 21°22′E
- Country: Poland
- Voivodeship: Masovian
- County: Mińsk
- Gmina: Halinów
- Population: 231

Mrowiska [mrɔˈviska] is a village in the administrative district of Gmina Halinów, within Mińsk County, Masovian Voivodeship, in east-central Poland.
