= Zagórze, Mińsk County =

Zagórze
- Village
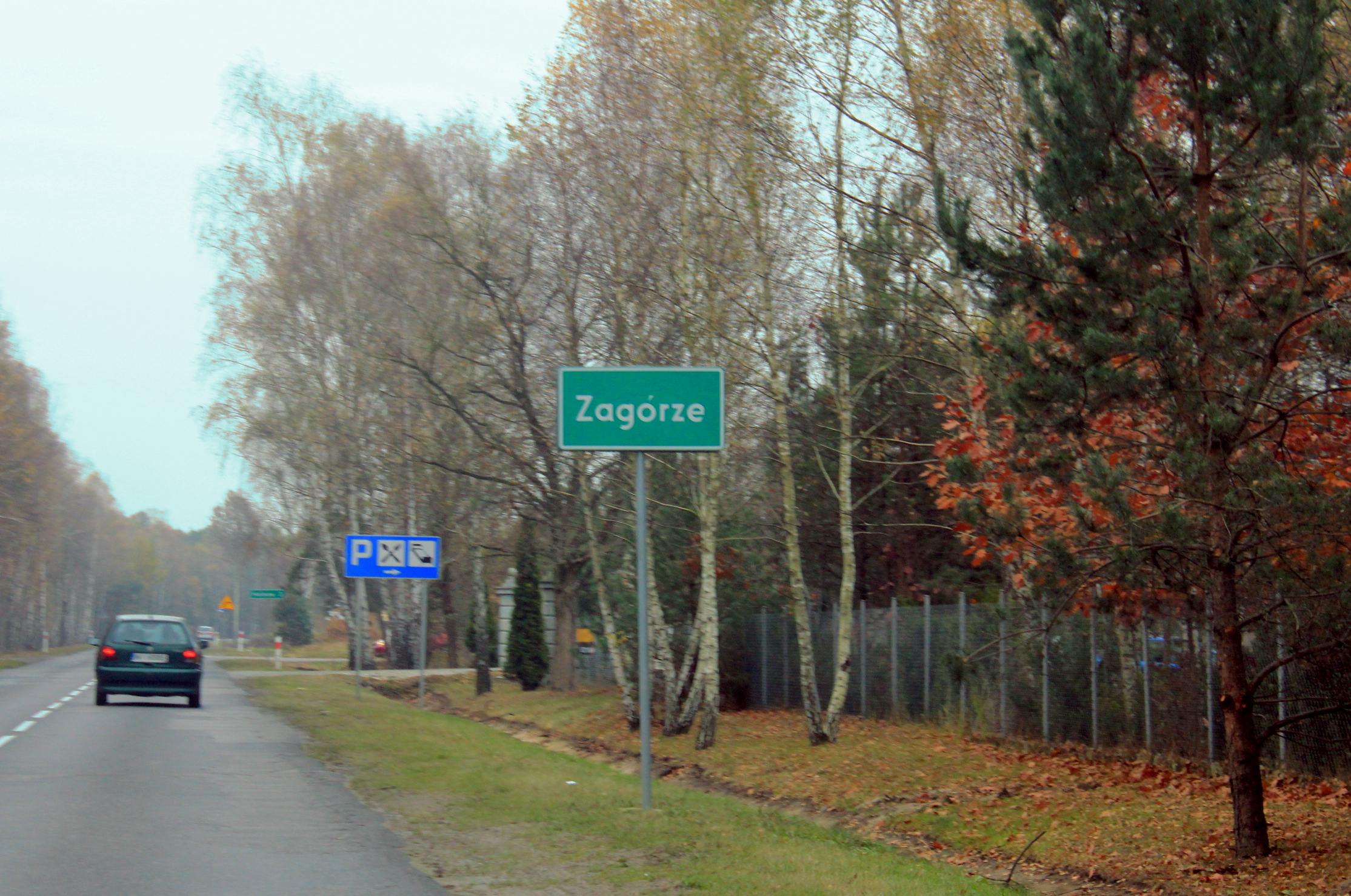

- Location within Poland
- Coordinates: 52°16′14″N 21°20′44″E
- Country: Poland
- Voivodeship: Masovian
- County: Mińsk
- Gmina: Halinów
- Population: 225

Zagórze [zaˈɡuʐɛ] is a village in the administrative district of Gmina Halinów, within Mińsk County, Masovian Voivodeship, in east-central Poland.
