= Zalesie, Gmina Pionki =

Zalesie
- Village
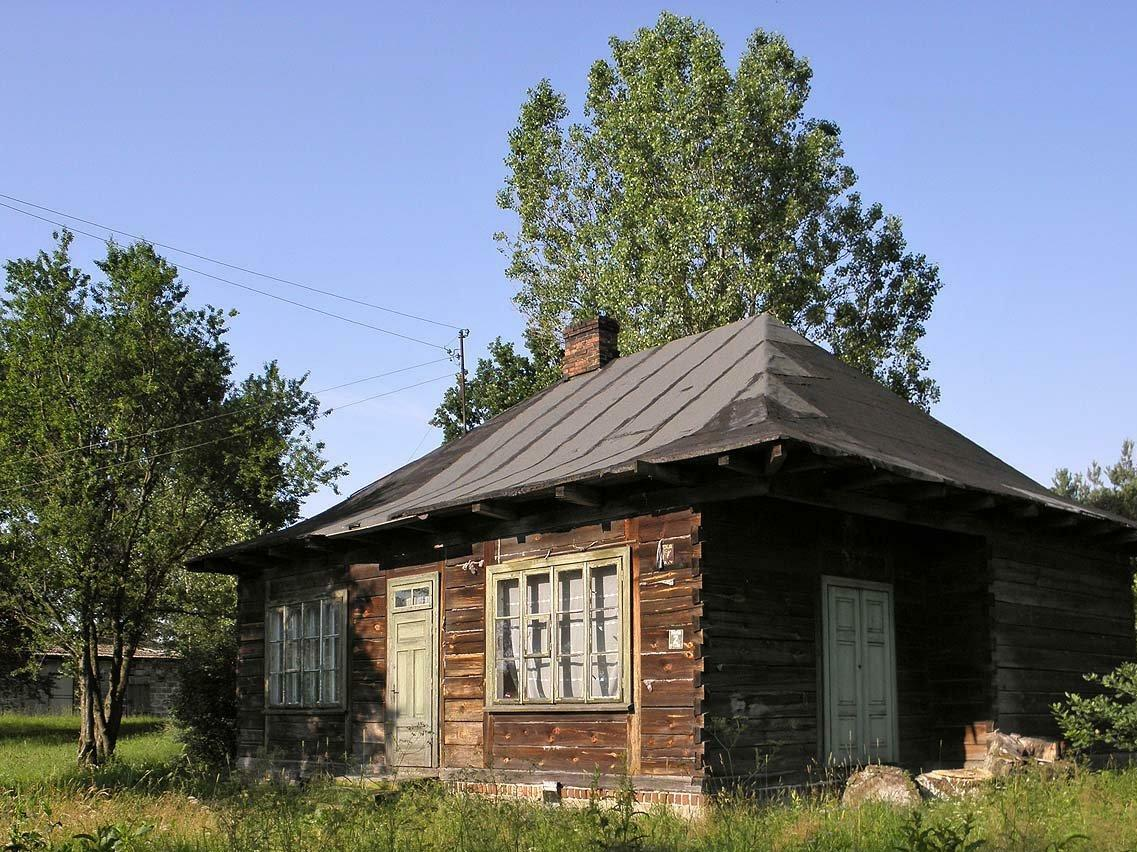

- Location within Poland
- Coordinates: 51°28′06″N 21°28′42″E
- Country: Poland
- Voivodeship: Masovian
- County: Radom
- Gmina: Pionki

Zalesie [zaˈlɛɕɛ] is a village in the administrative district of Gmina Pionki, within Radom County, Masovian Voivodeship, in east-central Poland.
