= Krzewina, Masovian Voivodeship =

Krzewina
- Village
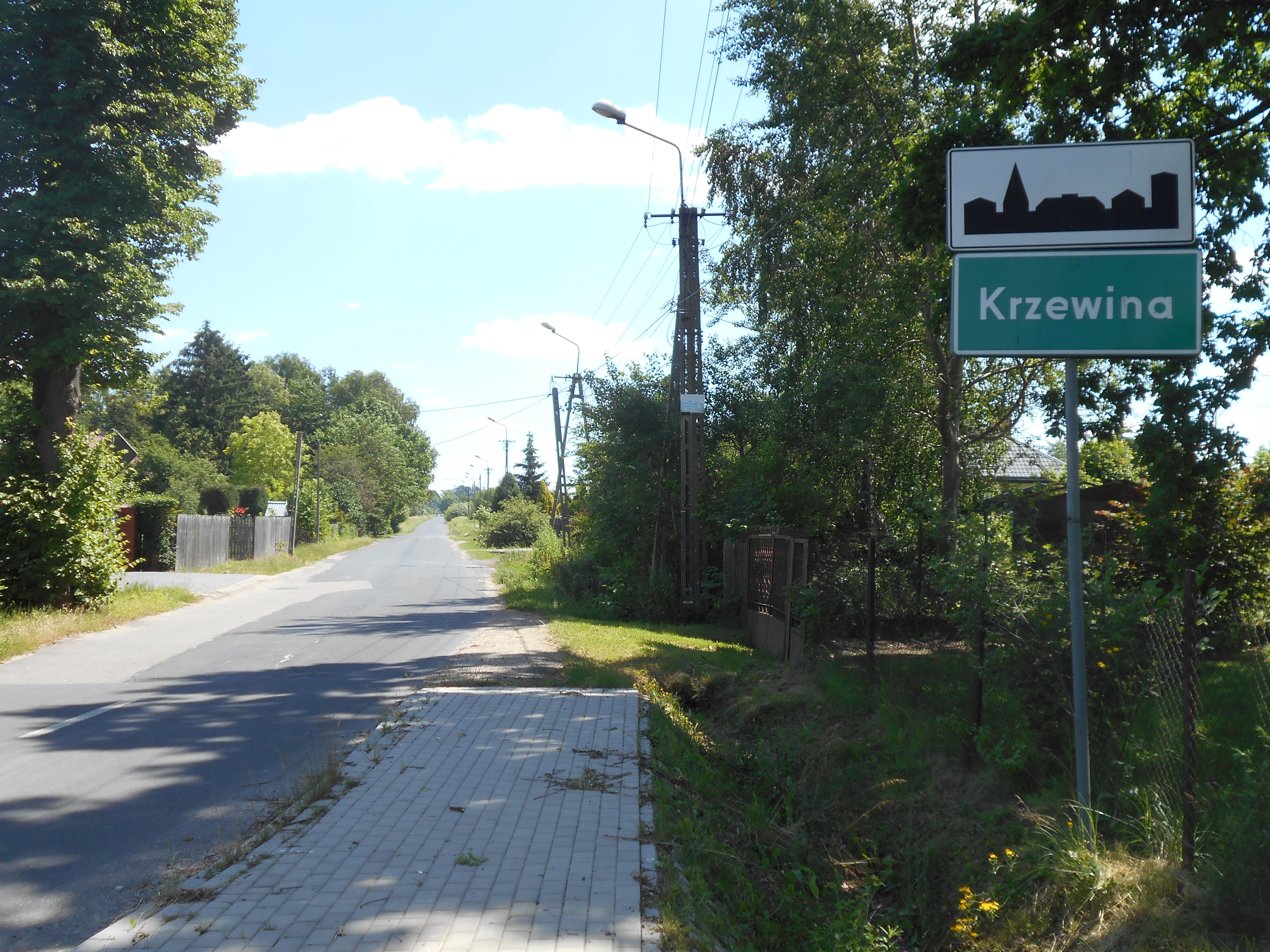

- Location within Poland
- Coordinates: 52°13′44″N 21°23′54″E
- Country: Poland
- Voivodeship: Masovian
- County: Mińsk
- Gmina: Halinów
- Population: 266

Krzewina [kʂɛˈvina] is a village in the administrative district of Gmina Halinów, within Mińsk County, Masovian Voivodeship, in east-central Poland.
