= Budziska, Gmina Halinów =

Budziska
- Village
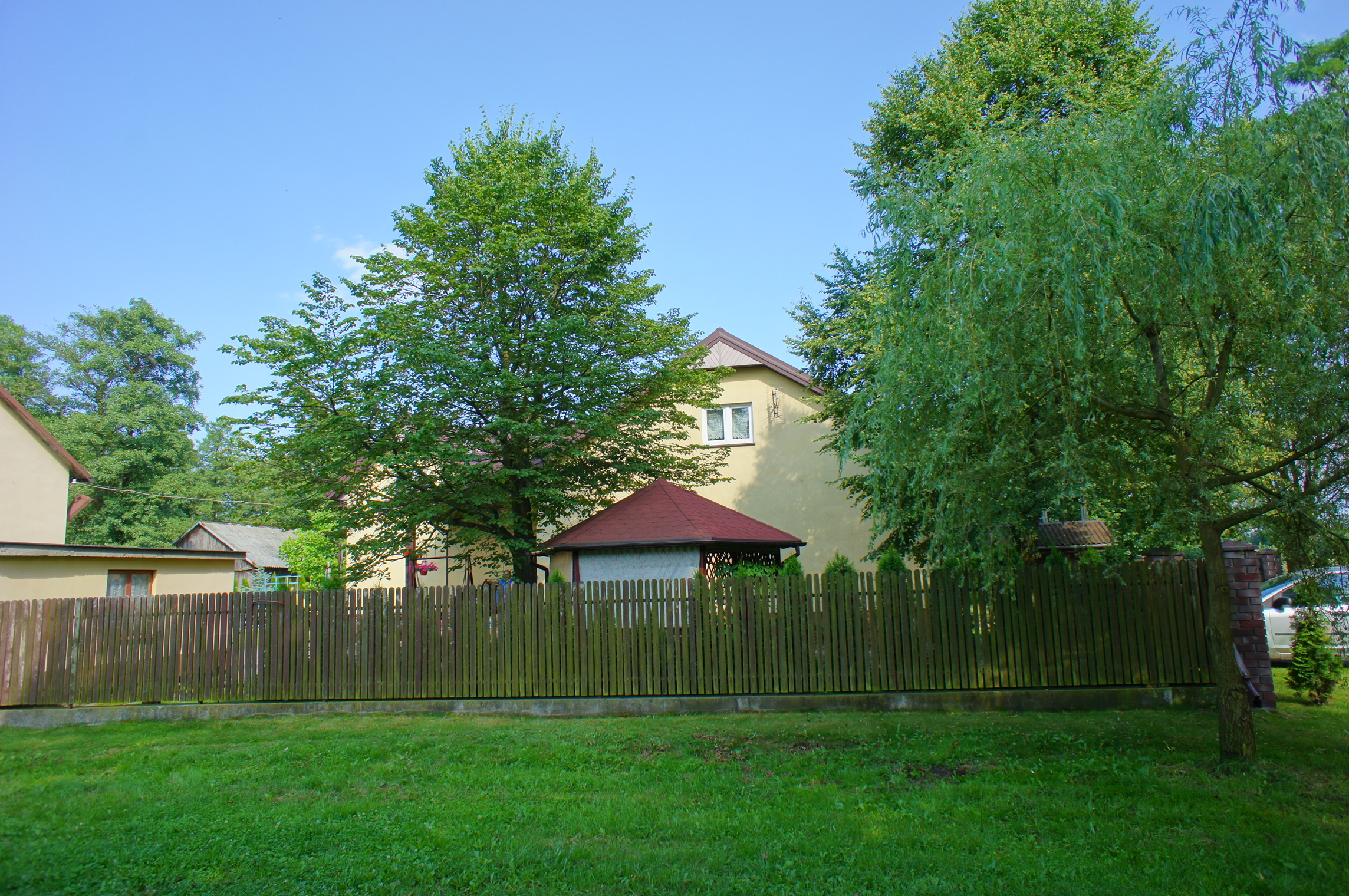

- Location within Poland
- Coordinates: 52°15′49″N 21°20′23″E
- Country: Poland
- Voivodeship: Masovian
- County: Mińsk
- Gmina: Halinów

Population
  - Total: 145
- Time zone: UTC+1 (CET)
  - Summer (DST): UTC+2 (CEST)

Budziska [buˈd͡ʑiska] is a village in the administrative district of Gmina Halinów, within Mińsk County, Masovian Voivodeship, in east-central Poland.
