= Gmina Halinów =

Gmina Halinów Halinów Commune
- Gmina
- Coat of arms
- Interactive map of Gmina Halinów
- Coordinates (Halinów): 52°14′N 21°21′E
- Country: Poland
- Voivodeship: Masovian
- County: Mińsk
- Seat: Halinów

Area
  - Total: 63.09 km^{2} (24.36 sq mi)

Population (2013)
  - Total: 15,070
  - Density: 238.9/km^{2} (618.7/sq mi)
  - Urban: 3,654
  - Rural: 11,416
- Website: http://www.halinow.pl/135-40d070cc806e0.htm

Gmina Halinów is an urban-rural gmina (administrative district) in Mińsk County, Masovian Voivodeship, in east-central Poland. Its seat is the town of Halinów, which lies approximately 16 kilometres (10 mi) west of Mińsk Mazowiecki and 24 km (15 mi) east of Warsaw.

The gmina covers an area of 63.09 square kilometres (24.4 sq mi), and as of 2006 its total population is 12,538 (out of which the population of Halinów amounts to 3,369, and the population of the rural part of the gmina is 9,169).

== Villages ==
Apart from the town of Halinów, Gmina Halinów contains the villages and settlements of Brzeziny, Budziska, Chobot, Cisie, Desno, Długa Kościelna, Długa Szlachecka, Grabina, Hipolitów, Józefin, Kazimierów, Królewskie Brzeziny, Krzewina, Michałów, Mrowiska, Nowy Konik, Okuniew, Stary Konik, Wielgolas Brzeziński, Wielgolas Duchnowski, Zagórze and Żwirówka.

== Neighbouring gminas ==
Gmina Halinów is bordered by the towns of Sulejówek and Zielonka, and by the gminas of Dębe Wielkie and Wiązowna.
