= Wincentów, Radom County =

Wincentów
- Village
- Location within Poland
- Coordinates: 51°26′51″N 21°25′49″E
- Country: Poland
- Voivodeship: Masovian
- County: Radom
- Gmina: Pionki

Wincentów [vinˈt͡sɛntuf] is a village in the administrative district of Gmina Pionki, within Radom County, Masovian Voivodeship, in east-central Poland.
