= Gmina Pionki =

Gmina Pionki Pionki Commune
- Gmina
- Flag Coat of arms

- Location within Poland
- Coordinates (Pionki): 51°29′N 21°27′E
- Country: Poland
- Voivodeship: Masovian
- County: Radom County
- Seat: Pionki

Area
  - Total: 230.82 km^{2} (89.12 sq mi)

Population (2006)
  - Total: 9,841
  - Density: 42.63/km^{2} (110.4/sq mi)
- Website: http://www.gmina-pionki.pl/

Gmina Pionki is a rural gmina (administrative district) in Radom County, Masovian Voivodeship, in east-central Poland. Its seat is the town of Pionki, although the town is not part of the territory of the gmina.

The gmina covers an area of 230.82 square kilometres (89.1 sq mi), and as of 2006 its total population is 9,841.

== Villages ==
Gmina Pionki contains the villages and settlements of Adolfin, Augustów, Bieliny, Brzezinki, Brzeziny, Czarna Wieś, Czarna-Kolonia, Działki Suskowolskie, Helenów, Huta, Januszno, Jaroszki, Jaśce, Jedlnia, Jedlnia-Kolonia, Kieszek, Kolonka, Krasna Dąbrowa, Laski, Marcelów, Mireń, Płachty, Poświętne, Sałki, Sokoły, Stoki, Sucha, Suskowola, Tadeuszów, Wincentów, Zadobrze, Zalesie and Żdżary.

== Neighbouring gminas ==
Gmina Pionki is bordered by the gminas of Garbatka-Letnisko, Głowaczów, Gózd, Jastrzębia, Jedlnia-Letnisko, Kozienice, Policzna and Zwoleń.
