= Okuniew =

- Village
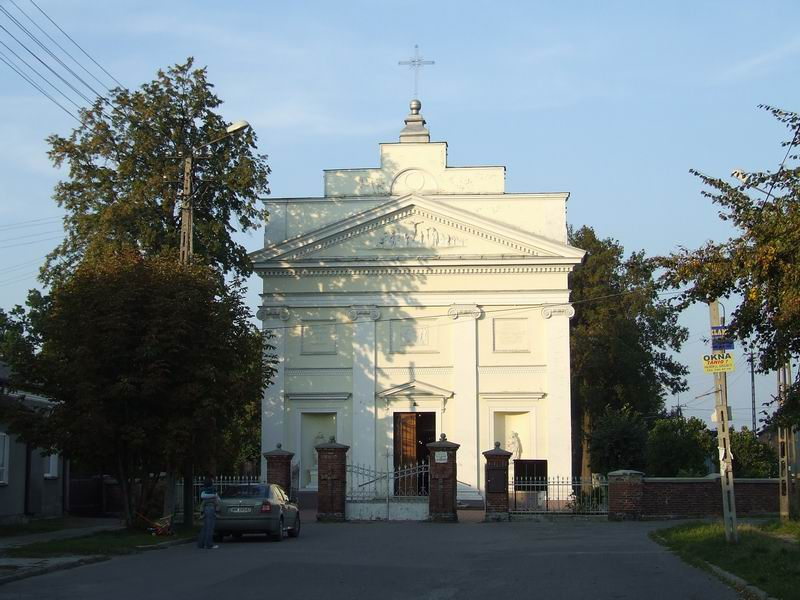
- Church of Saint Stanisław Kostka

- Location within Poland
- Coordinates: 52°16′N 21°18′E
- Country: Poland
- Voivodeship: Masovian
- County: Mińsk
- Gmina: Halinów

Population
  - Total: 1,900

Okuniew [ɔˈkuɲɛf] is a village in the administrative district of Gmina Halinów, within Mińsk County, Masovian Voivodeship, in east-central Poland.
