= Sokoły, Masovian Voivodeship =

Sokoły
- Village
- Location within Poland
- Coordinates: 51°27′21″N 21°24′12″E
- Country: Poland
- Voivodeship: Masovian
- County: Radom
- Gmina: Pionki

Sokoły [sɔˈkɔwɨ] is a village in the administrative district of Gmina Pionki, within Radom County, Masovian Voivodeship, in east-central Poland.
