= Suskowola =

- Village
- Location within Poland
- Coordinates: 51°28′N 21°29′E
- Country: Poland
- Voivodeship: Masovian
- County: Radom
- Gmina: Pionki
- Population: 860

Suskowola [suskɔˈvɔla] is a village in the administrative district of Gmina Pionki, within Radom County, Masovian Voivodeship, in east-central Poland.
