= Sucha, Radom County =

Sucha
- Village
- Location within Poland
- Coordinates: 51°25′N 21°30′E
- Country: Poland
- Voivodeship: Masovian
- County: Radom
- Gmina: Pionki
- Population: 650

Sucha [ˈsuxa] is a village in the administrative district of Gmina Pionki, within Radom County, Masovian Voivodeship, in east-central Poland.
