= Nowy Konik =

- Village
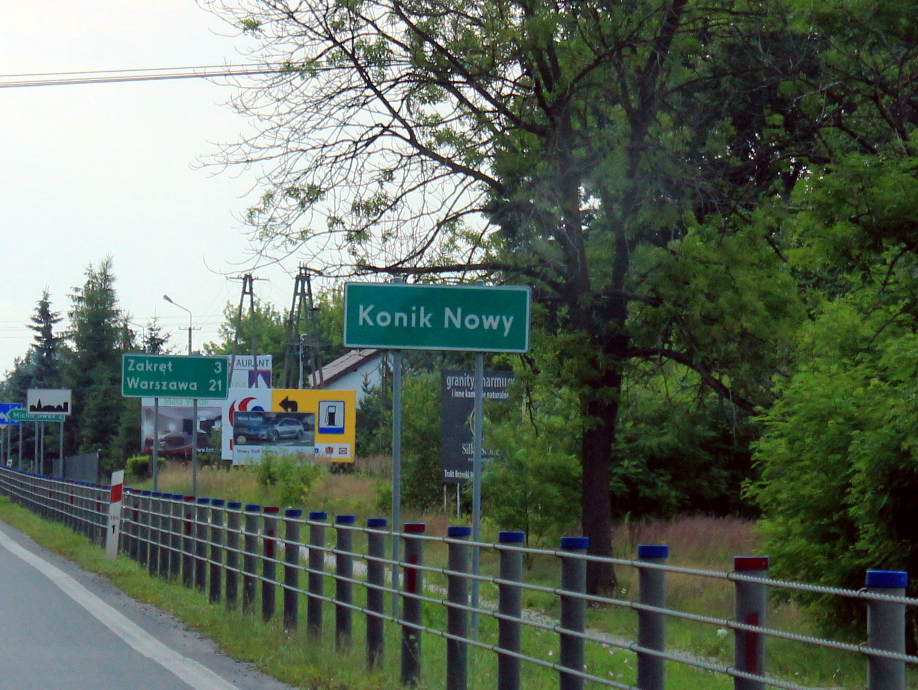

- Location within Poland
- Coordinates: 52°13′N 21°18′E
- Country: Poland
- Voivodeship: Masovian
- County: Mińsk
- Gmina: Halinów
- Population: 230

Nowy Konik [ˈnɔvɨ ˈkɔnik] is a village in the administrative district of Gmina Halinów, within Mińsk County, Masovian Voivodeship, in east-central Poland.
