= Grabina, Gmina Halinów =

Grabina
- Village
- Location within Poland
- Coordinates: 52°14′6″N 21°18′49″E
- Country: Poland
- Voivodeship: Masovian
- County: Mińsk
- Gmina: Halinów

Grabina [ɡraˈbina] is a village in the administrative district of Gmina Halinów, within Mińsk County, Masovian Voivodeship, in east-central Poland.
