= Augustów, Gmina Pionki =

Augustów
- Village
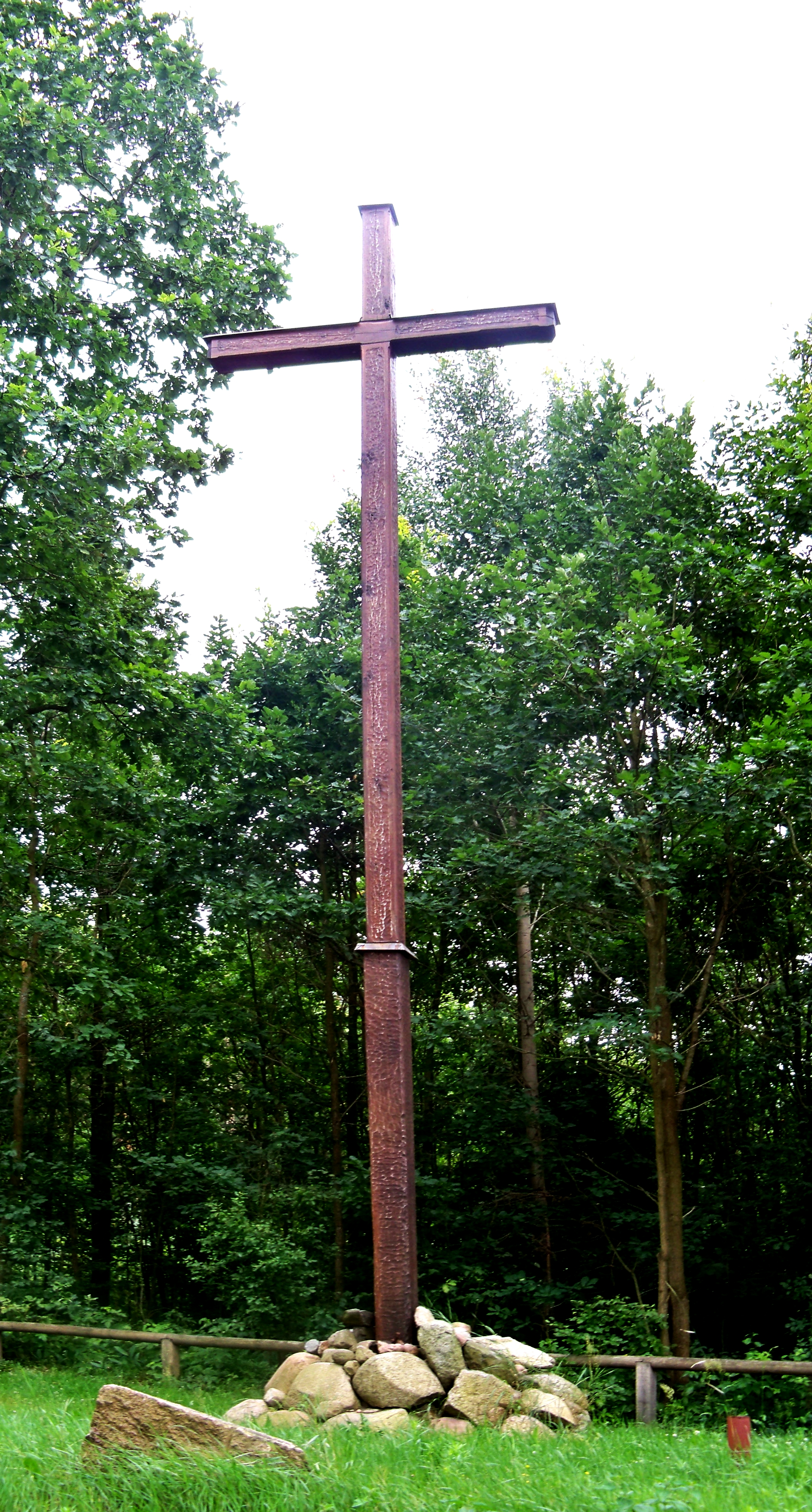

- Location within Poland
- Coordinates: 51°31′17.4″N 21°28′27.7″E
- Country: Poland
- Voivodeship: Masovian
- County: Radom
- Gmina: Pionki

Augustów [auˈɡustuf] is a village in the administrative district of Gmina Pionki, within Radom County, Masovian Voivodeship, in east-central Poland.
