= Michałów, Mińsk County =

Michałów
- Village
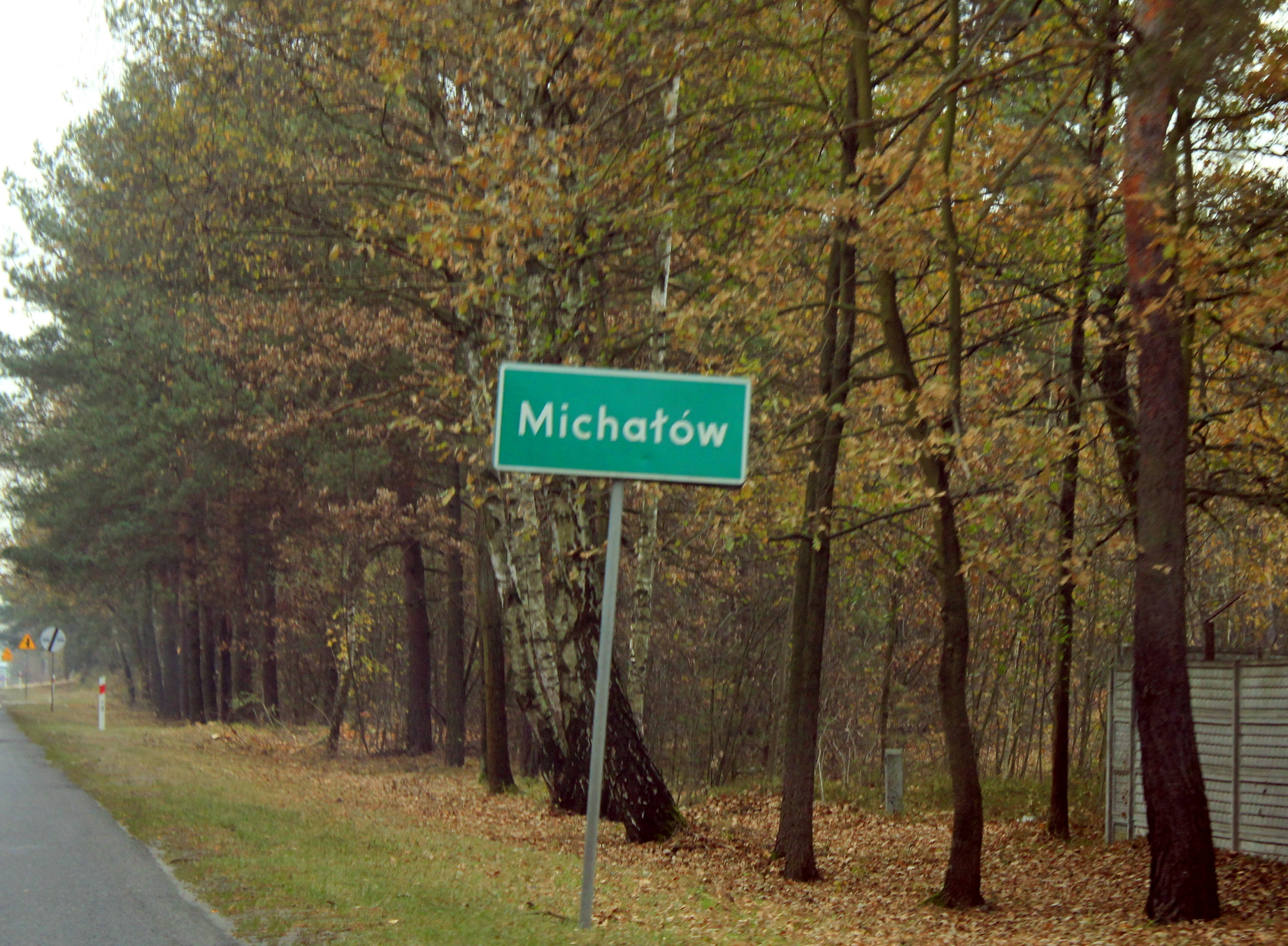

- Location within Poland
- Coordinates: 52°16′N 21°23′E
- Country: Poland
- Voivodeship: Masovian
- County: Mińsk
- Gmina: Halinów

Population
  - Total: 461

Michałów [miˈxawuf] is a village in the administrative district of Gmina Halinów, within Mińsk County, Masovian Voivodeship, in east-central Poland.
