= Krasna Dąbrowa =

Village in Gmina Pionki, Poland

- Village
- Location within Poland
- Coordinates: 51°29′43″N 21°32′07″E
- Country: Poland
- Voivodeship: Masovian
- County: Radom
- Gmina: Pionki

Krasna Dąbrowa [ˈkrasna dɔmˈbrɔva] is a village in the administrative district of Gmina Pionki, within Radom County, Masovian Voivodeship, in east-central Poland.
