= Chobot, Masovian Voivodeship =

Chobot
- Village
- Location within Poland
- Coordinates: 52°15′N 21°24′E
- Country: Poland
- Voivodeship: Masovian
- County: Mińsk
- Gmina: Halinów
- Population: 161

Chobot [ˈxɔbɔt] is a village in the administrative district of Gmina Halinów, within Mińsk County, Masovian Voivodeship, in east-central Poland.
