= Helenów, Radom County =

Helenów
- Village
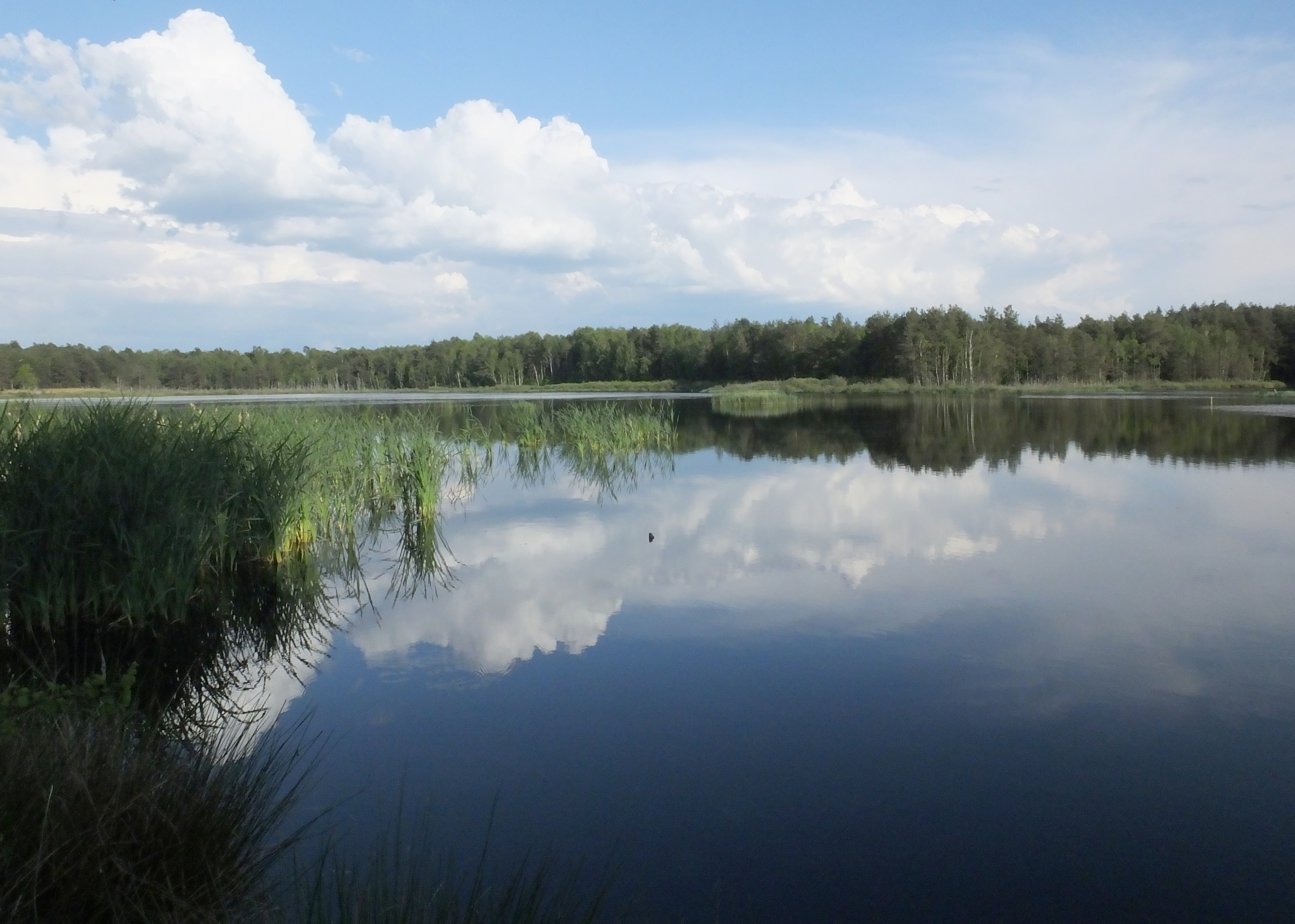
- Pond in Helenowie

- Location within Poland
- Coordinates: 51°24′6″N 21°26′26″E
- Country: Poland
- Voivodeship: Masovian
- County: Radom
- Gmina: Pionki

Helenów [xɛˈlɛnuf] is a village in the administrative district of Gmina Pionki, within Radom County, Masovian Voivodeship, in east-central Poland.
