= Poświętne, Radom County =

Poświętne
- Village
- Location within Poland
- Coordinates: 51°28′7″N 21°21′41″E
- Country: Poland
- Voivodeship: Masovian
- County: Radom
- Gmina: Pionki
- Population (approx.): 150

Poświętne [pɔɕˈfjɛntnɛ] is a village in the administrative district of Gmina Pionki, within Radom County, Masovian Voivodeship, in east-central Poland.
