= Stoki, Masovian Voivodeship =

Stoki
- Village
- Location within Poland
- Coordinates: 51°30′26″N 21°20′13″E
- Country: Poland
- Voivodeship: Masovian
- County: Radom
- Gmina: Pionki

Stoki [ˈstɔki] is a village in the administrative district of Gmina Pionki within Radom County, Masovian Voivodeship, in east-central Poland.
