= Brzezinki, Radom County =

Brzezinki
- Village
- Location within Poland
- Coordinates: 51°28′51″N 21°20′59″E
- Country: Poland
- Voivodeship: Masovian
- County: Radom
- Gmina: Pionki

Brzezinki [bʐɛˈʑinki] is a village in the administrative district of Gmina Pionki, within Radom County, Masovian Voivodeship, in east-central Poland.
