= Wielgolas Brzeziński =

- Village
- Location within Poland
- Coordinates: 52°12′16″N 21°23′20″E
- Country: Poland
- Voivodeship: Masovian
- County: Mińsk
- Gmina: Halinów
- Population: 813

Wielgolas Brzeziński [vjɛlˈɡɔlas bʐɛˈʑiɲski] is a village in the administrative district of Gmina Halinów, within Mińsk County, Masovian Voivodeship, in east-central Poland.
