= Żdżary, Radom County =

Żdżary
- Village
- Location within Poland
- Coordinates: 51°27′N 21°23′E
- Country: Poland
- Voivodeship: Masovian
- County: Radom
- Gmina: Pionki

Żdżary [ˈʐd͡ʐarɨ] is a village in the administrative district of Gmina Pionki, within Radom County, Masovian Voivodeship, in east-central Poland.
