= Marcelów, Gmina Pionki =

Marcelów
- Village
- Location within Poland
- Coordinates: 51°25′50″N 21°24′59″E
- Country: Poland
- Voivodeship: Masovian
- County: Radom
- Gmina: Pionki

Marcelów [marˈt͡sɛluf] is a village in the administrative district of Gmina Pionki, within Radom County, Masovian Voivodeship, in east-central Poland.
