= Czarna-Kolonia =

- Village
- Location within Poland
- Coordinates: 51°25′34″N 21°26′27″E
- Country: Poland
- Voivodeship: Masovian
- County: Radom
- Gmina: Pionki

Czarna-Kolonia [ˈt͡ʂarna kɔˈlɔɲa] is a village in the administrative district of Gmina Pionki, within Radom County, Masovian Voivodeship, in east-central Poland.
