= Wielgolas Duchnowski =

- Village
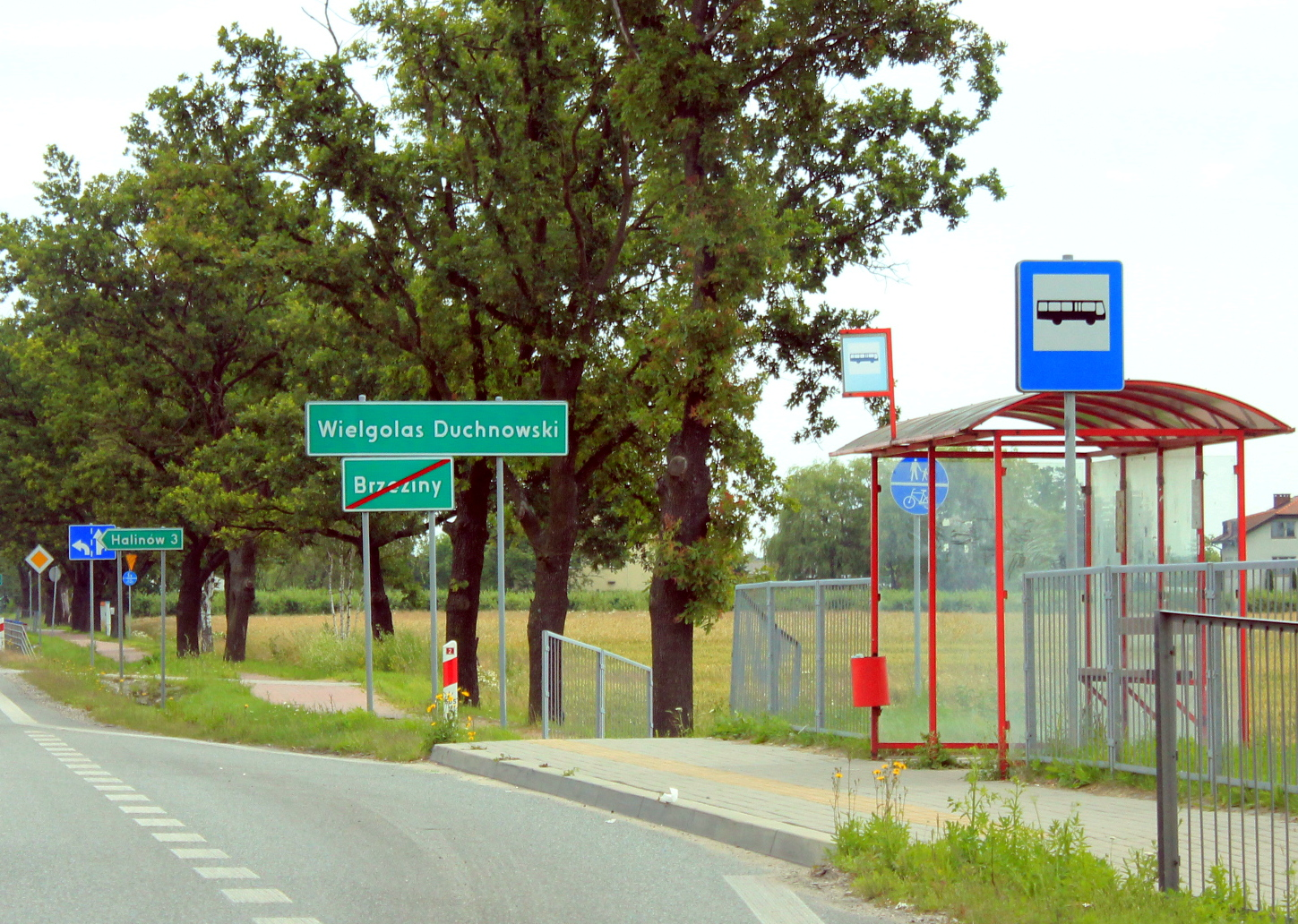

- Location within Poland
- Coordinates: 52°11′39″N 21°24′16″E
- Country: Poland
- Voivodeship: Masovian
- County: Mińsk
- Gmina: Halinów
- Population: 480

Wielgolas Duchnowski [vjɛlˈɡɔlas duxˈnɔfski] is a village in the administrative district of Gmina Halinów, within Mińsk County, Masovian Voivodeship, in east-central Poland.
