= Brzeziny, Mińsk County =

Brzeziny
- Village
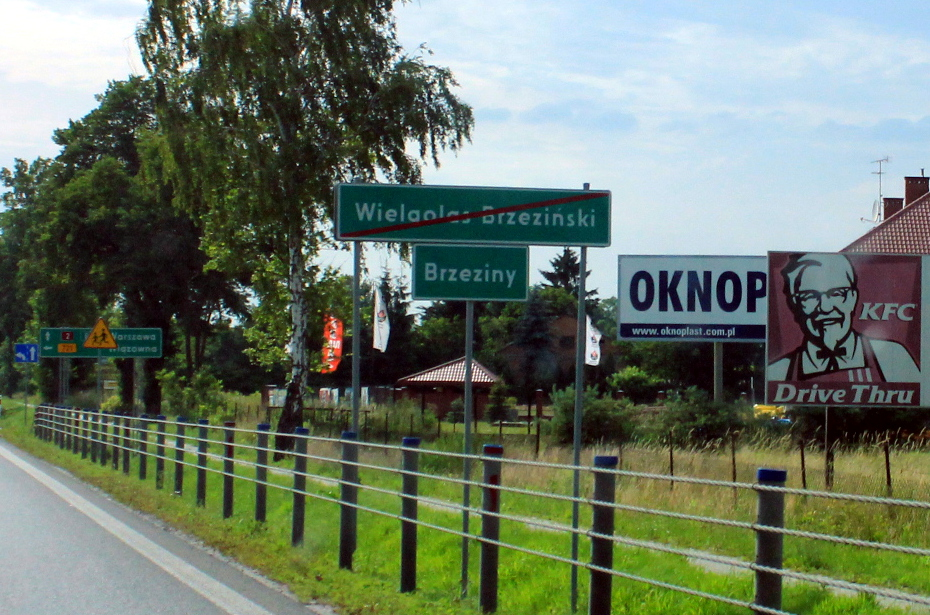

- Location within Poland
- Coordinates: 52°12′N 21°22′E
- Country: Poland
- Voivodeship: Masovian
- County: Mińsk
- Gmina: Halinów

Brzeziny [bʐɛˈʑinɨ] is a village in the administrative district of Gmina Halinów, within Mińsk County, Masovian Voivodeship, in east-central Poland.
