= Brzeziny, Warsaw =

Neighbourhood in Warsaw, Masovian Voivodeship, Poland

Brzeziny
- Neighbourhood and Municipal Information System area
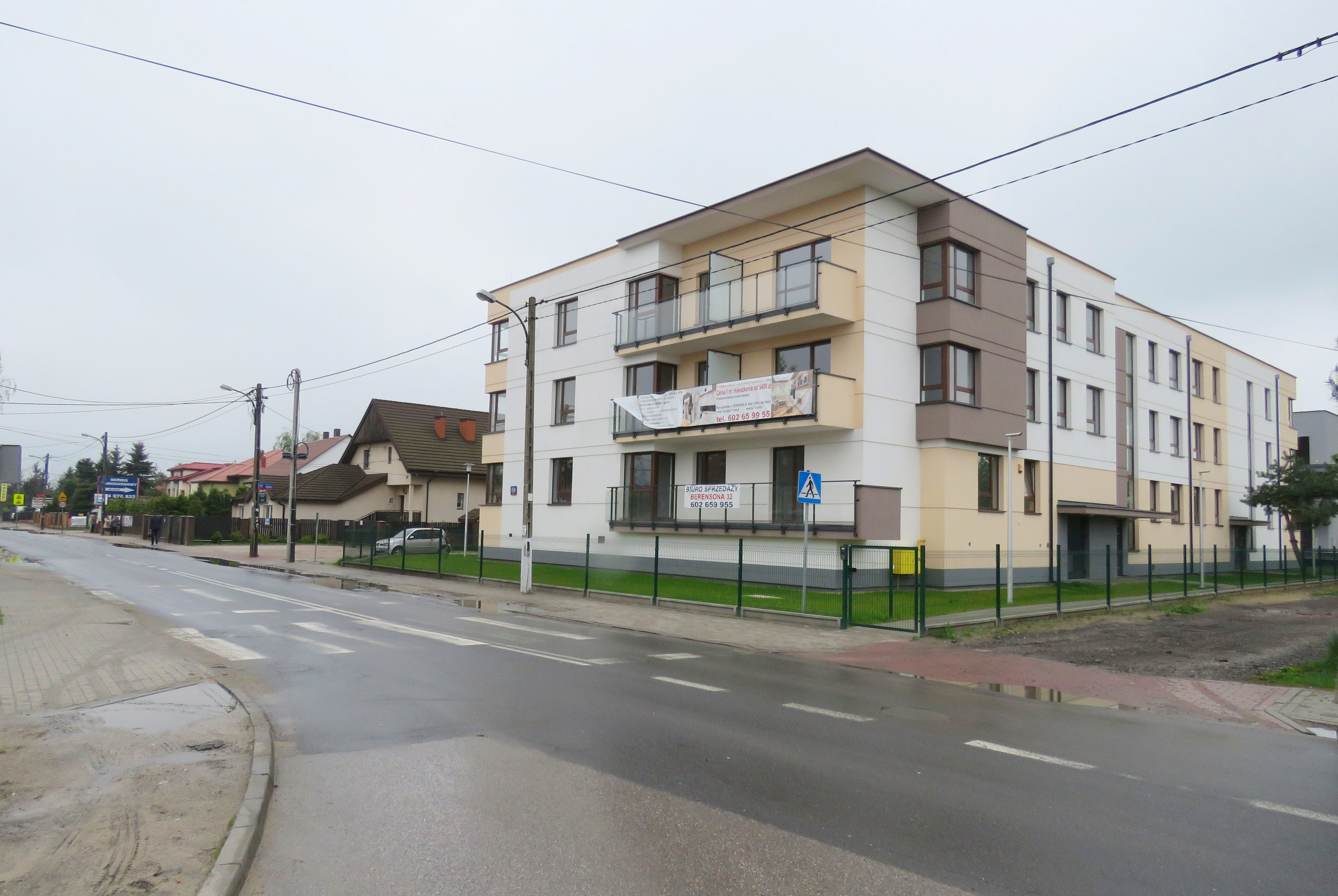

- Location of Brzeziny within the district of Białołęka, in accordance to the Municipal Information System.
- Coordinates: 52°19′23″N 21°01′58″E
- Country: Poland
- Voivodeship: Masovian Voivodeship
- City county: Warsaw
- District: Białołęka
- Time zone: UTC+1 (CET)
  - Summer (DST): UTC+2 (CEST)
- Area code: +48 22

Brzeziny (Note: Polish pronunciation: [bʐɛˈʑinɨ]) is a neighbourhood, and an area of the Municipal Information System, in the city of Warsaw, Poland, located within the district of Białołęka.

== History ==
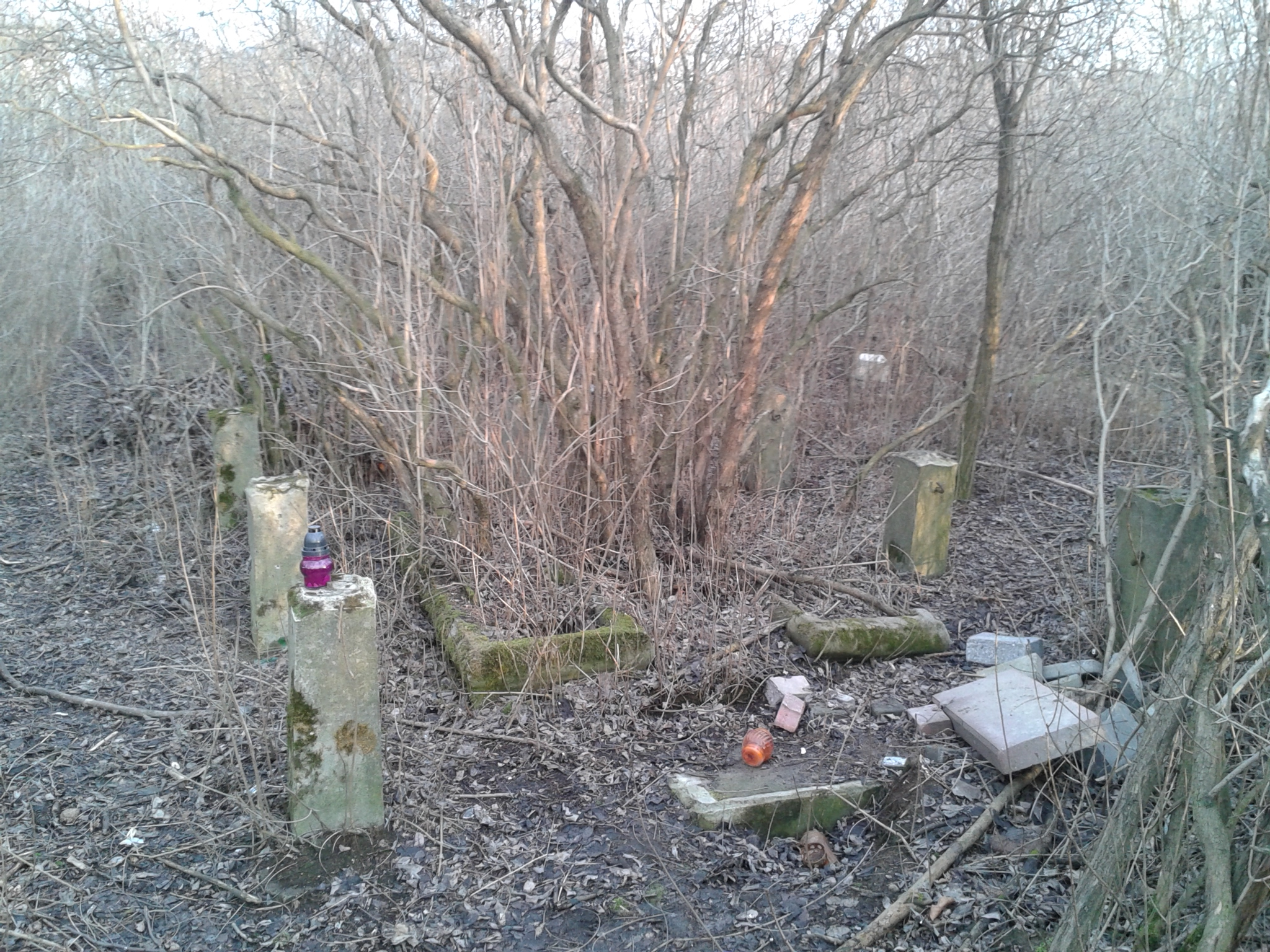
Brzeziny Evangelical Cemetery in 2015.

In the 19th century, the area of Brzeziny was settled by Olęders, a group of people of German origin.

By 1880, Brzeziny was a small village located near the city of Warsaw.

In 1941, during the occupation of Poland in Second World War by Nazi Germany, the Olęder inhabitants of the area were forcefully removed and relocated, most likely to the Province of Pomerania, Germany. The Brzeziny Evangelical Cemetery is the remainder of the Olęder presence in the area. Following their expulsion, the cemetery had been closed.

On 15 May 1951, Brzeziny had been incorporated into the city of Warsaw.
