= Halinów =

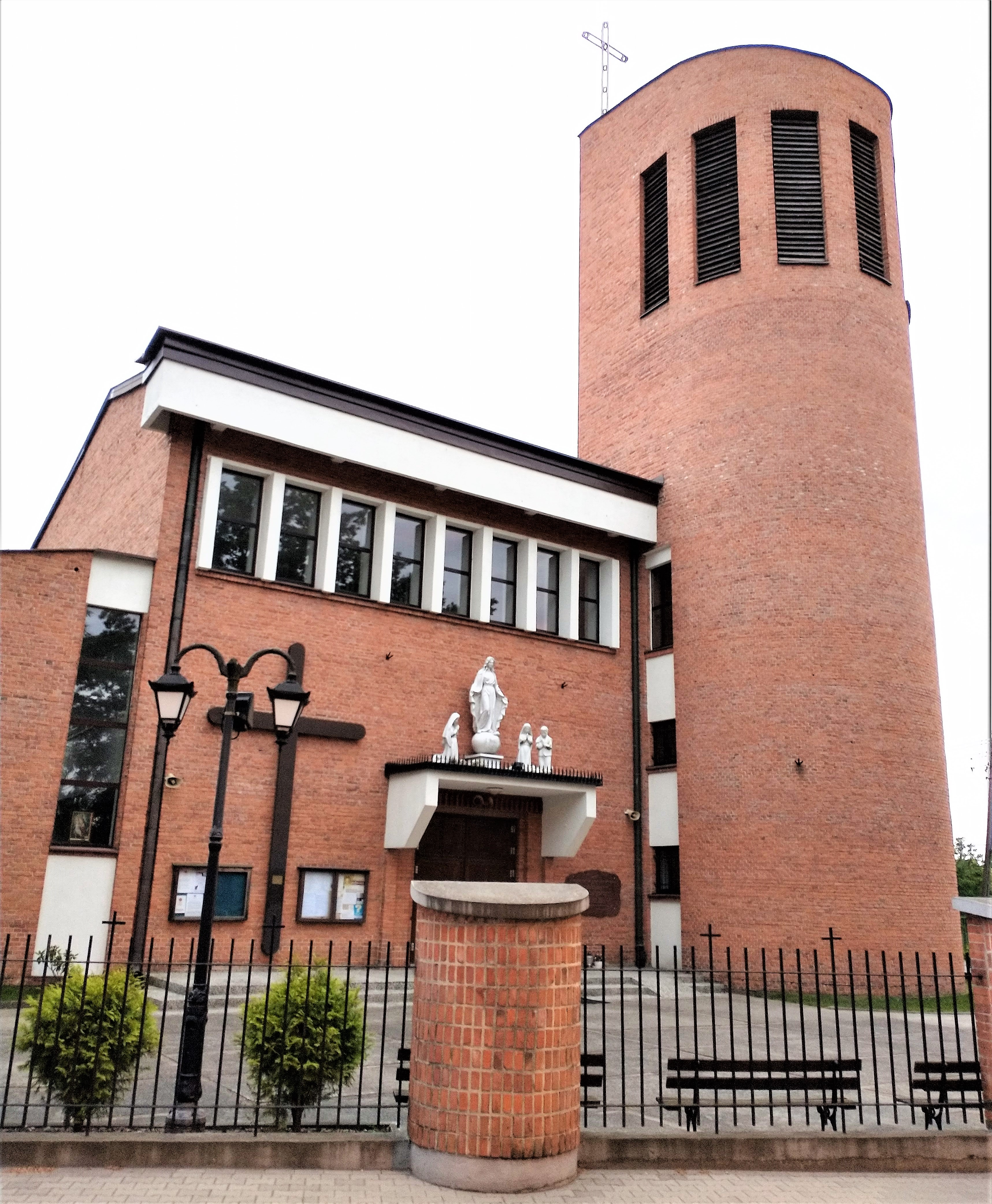
- Our Lady of Graces church in Halinów

- Coat of arms

- Location within Poland
- Coordinates: 52°14′N 21°21′E
- Country: Poland
- Voivodeship: Masovian
- County: Mińsk
- Gmina: Halinów
- Established: 19th century
- Town rights: 2001

Government
  - Mayor: Adam Ciszkowski

Area
  - Total: 2.84 km^{2} (1.10 sq mi)

Population (2022)
  - Total: 3,752
  - Density: 1,320/km^{2} (3,420/sq mi)
- Time zone: UTC+1 (CET)
  - Summer (DST): UTC+2 (CEST)
- Postal code: 05-074
- Area code: +48 22
- Car plates: WM
- Website: http://www.halinow.pl/

Halinów [xaˈlʲinuf] is a town in Mińsk County, Masovian Voivodeship, Poland, with 3,752 inhabitants (2022).

== Transport ==
There is a train station in Halinów, and the Polish A2 motorway (part of the European route E30) runs nearby, just south of the town. Exit 34 of the A2 motorway serves the town.
