= Brzeziny, Radom County =

Brzeziny
- Village
- Location within Poland
- Coordinates: 51°29′N 21°23′E
- Country: Poland
- Voivodeship: Masovian
- County: Radom
- Gmina: Pionki

Brzeziny [bʐɛˈʑinɨ] is a village in the administrative district of Gmina Pionki, within Radom County, Masovian Voivodeship, in east-central Poland.
