= Straza =

Straza may refer to:

== Bosnia and Herzegovina ==
- Straža, Bosnia and Herzegovina

== Croatia ==
- Straža, Croatia, a village near Netretić

== North Macedonia ==
- Straža, Lipkovo

== Poland ==
- Straża

== Serbia ==
- Straža (Loznica), a village in Mačva District
- Straža (Vršac), a village in South Banat District

== Slovakia ==
- Stráža

== Slovenia ==
- Municipality of Straža, in southeastern Slovenia
- Straža, Cerkno, a settlement in the Municipality of Cerkno
- Straža, Lukovica, a settlement in the Municipality of Lukovica
- Straža pri Dolu, a settlement in the Municipality of Vojnik
- Straža na Gori, a settlement in the Municipality of Šentjur
- Straža pri Krškem, a settlement in the Municipality of Krško
- Straža pri Moravčah, a settlement in the Municipality of Moravče
- Straža pri Novi Cerkvi, a settlement in the Municipality of Vojnik
- Straža pri Oplotnici, a settlement in the Municipality of Oplotnica
- Straža pri Raki, a settlement in the Municipality of Krško
- Straža, Šentrupert, a settlement in the Municipality of Šentrupert
- Straža, Straža, a settlement in the Municipality of Straža
- Straža Party – Catholic National Party, a nationalist political party in Slovenia

== See also ==
- Stróża (disambiguation)
- Strazha (disambiguation)
- Straja (disambiguation)
