= 1951 LOT Lisunov Li-2 crash =

Aviation disaster

Coordinates: 51°34′49″N 19°30′24″E

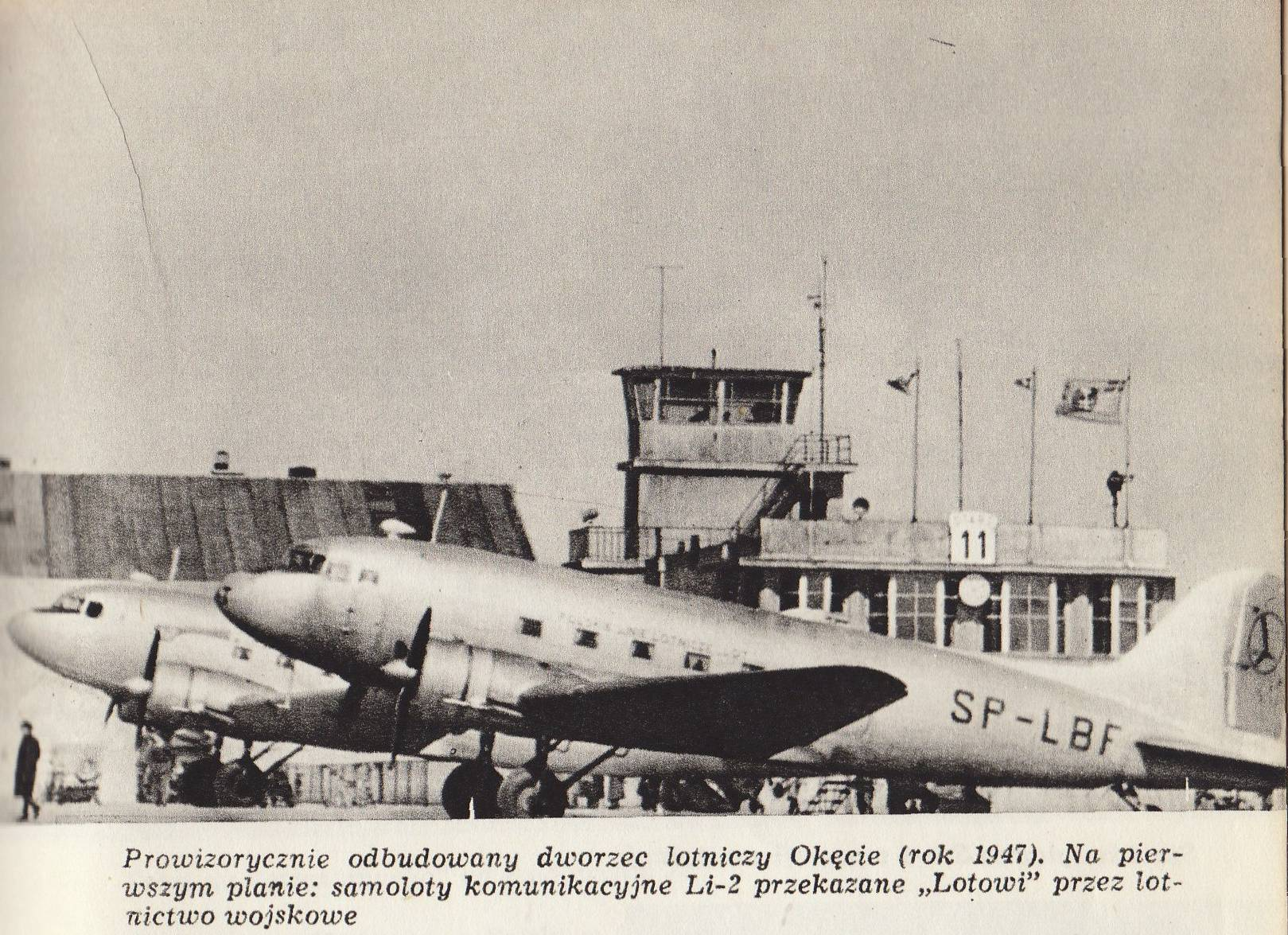
- Two Li-2s, similar to the accident aircraft, at Warsaw Chopin Airport in 1947.

Accident
- Date: 15 November 1951
- Summary: Engine failure, loss of control
- Site: Tuszyn, Poland

Aircraft
- Aircraft type: Lisunov Li-2
- Operator: LOT Polish Airlines
- Registration: SP-LKA
- Flight origin: Lublinek Airport
- Destination: John Paul II International Airport Kraków–Balice
- Occupants: 18
- Passengers: 15
- Crew: 3
- Fatalities: 18
- Survivors: 0

The 1951 LOT Lisunov Li-2 crash occurred on 15 November 1951 when a LOT Polish Airlines Lisunov Li-2 flew into power lines near Tuszyn, crashed and burst into flames. All 15 passengers and 3 crew died. It was the first LOT aircraft crash since the end of World War II.

== Incident ==
On 15 November 1951 a LOT Lisunov Li-2 was en route from Łódź to Kraków–Balice. Shortly after take-off while flying through Górki Duże near Tuszyn it flew into power lines, crashed and went into flames. All 15 passengers and 3 crew died. The Captain of the flight was Marian Buczkowski, father of Polish actor Zbigniew Buczkowski.

== Cause ==
The official cause of the disaster was attributed to bad weather conditions (low clouds and fog) and pilot error. However, an independent investigation conducted by journalists claimed that the cause was different, due to a lack of documentation in LOT archives.

The Li-2 flew in from Szczecin that day and after landing Buczkowski pointed out that one of the engines may have been faulty and refused to continue flying because he did not want to endanger the lives of the passengers.

A Ministry of Public Security officer entered the cockpit, calling him an "imperial reactionary" and stating that his behavior was a provocation. The officer stressed that a high-ranking officer urgently needed to get to Kraków and accused him of being friends with the pilots of the Royal Air Force. Buczkowski calmly emphasized again that he refused to fly because he did not want to endanger the lives of the passengers, but at this the officer drew his pistol and held it to Buczkowski's head. After arming the pistol, he gave a choice to Buczkowski: continue flying or be shot. Buczkowski asked first officer Bakalus to gather the rest of the crew and announced that they would be continuing to Kraków. Buczkowski reluctantly got back on the plane.

Due to the faulty engine the plane stalled, tipped over the power lines and crashed into a field.

== Memorial ==
On 27 November 2010, an obelisk was erected to commemorate the victims of the crash.
