= Górki Małe, Łódź Voivodeship =

Górki Małe
- Village
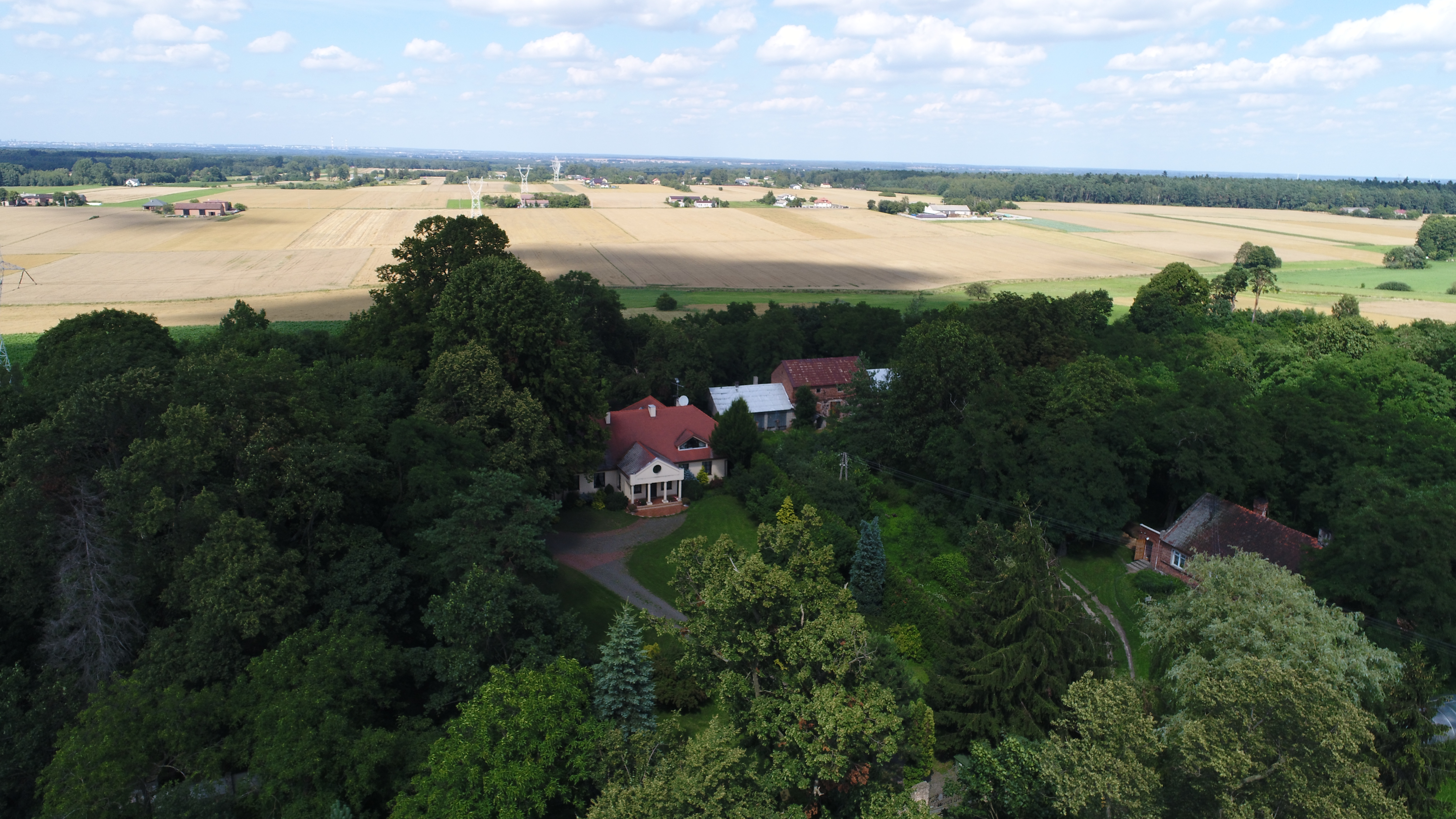
- Manor

- Location within Poland
- Coordinates: 51°34′49″N 19°30′24″E
- Country: Poland
- Voivodeship: Łódź
- County: Łódź East
- Gmina: Tuszyn

Górki Małe [ˈɡurki ˈmawɛ] is a village in the administrative district of Gmina Tuszyn, within Łódź East County, Łódź Voivodeship, in central Poland.
