= Garbów (disambiguation) =

Garbów may refer to the following places:

- Garbów, Kutno County in Łódź Voivodeship (central Poland)
- Garbów, Łódź East County in Łódź Voivodeship (central Poland)
- Garbów in Lublin Voivodeship (east Poland)
- Garbów, Sieradz County in Łódź Voivodeship (central Poland)
- Garbów, Opole Voivodeship (south-west Poland)
