= Garbówek =

- Village
- Location within Poland
- Coordinates: 51°34′51″N 19°32′34″E
- Country: Poland
- Voivodeship: Łódź
- County: Łódź East
- Gmina: Tuszyn
- Population: 70

Garbówek [ɡarˈbuvɛk] is a village in the administrative district of Gmina Tuszyn, within Łódź East County, Łódź Voivodeship, in central Poland.
