= Janówka =

Janówka may refer to the following places in Poland:

- Janówka, Lower Silesian Voivodeship (south-west Poland)
- Janówka, Gmina Biała Podlaska in Lublin Voivodeship (east Poland)
- Janówka, Gmina Piszczac in Lublin Voivodeship (east Poland)
- Janówka, Chełm County in Lublin Voivodeship (east Poland)
- Janówka, Podlaskie Voivodeship (north-east Poland)
- Janówka, Bełchatów County in Łódź Voivodeship (central Poland)
- Janówka, Łódź East County in Łódź Voivodeship (central Poland)
- Janówka, Piotrków County in Łódź Voivodeship (central Poland)
- Janówka, Włodawa County in Lublin Voivodeship (east Poland)
- Janówka, Zamość County in Lublin Voivodeship (east Poland)
- Janówka, Opole Voivodeship (south-west Poland)
- Janówka, Pomeranian Voivodeship (north Poland)
