= Badzyn =

Badzyn may refer to:

- Bądzyn, Masovian Voivodeship, Poland
- Bądzyń, Łódź Voivodeship, Poland
