= Żeromin =

- Village
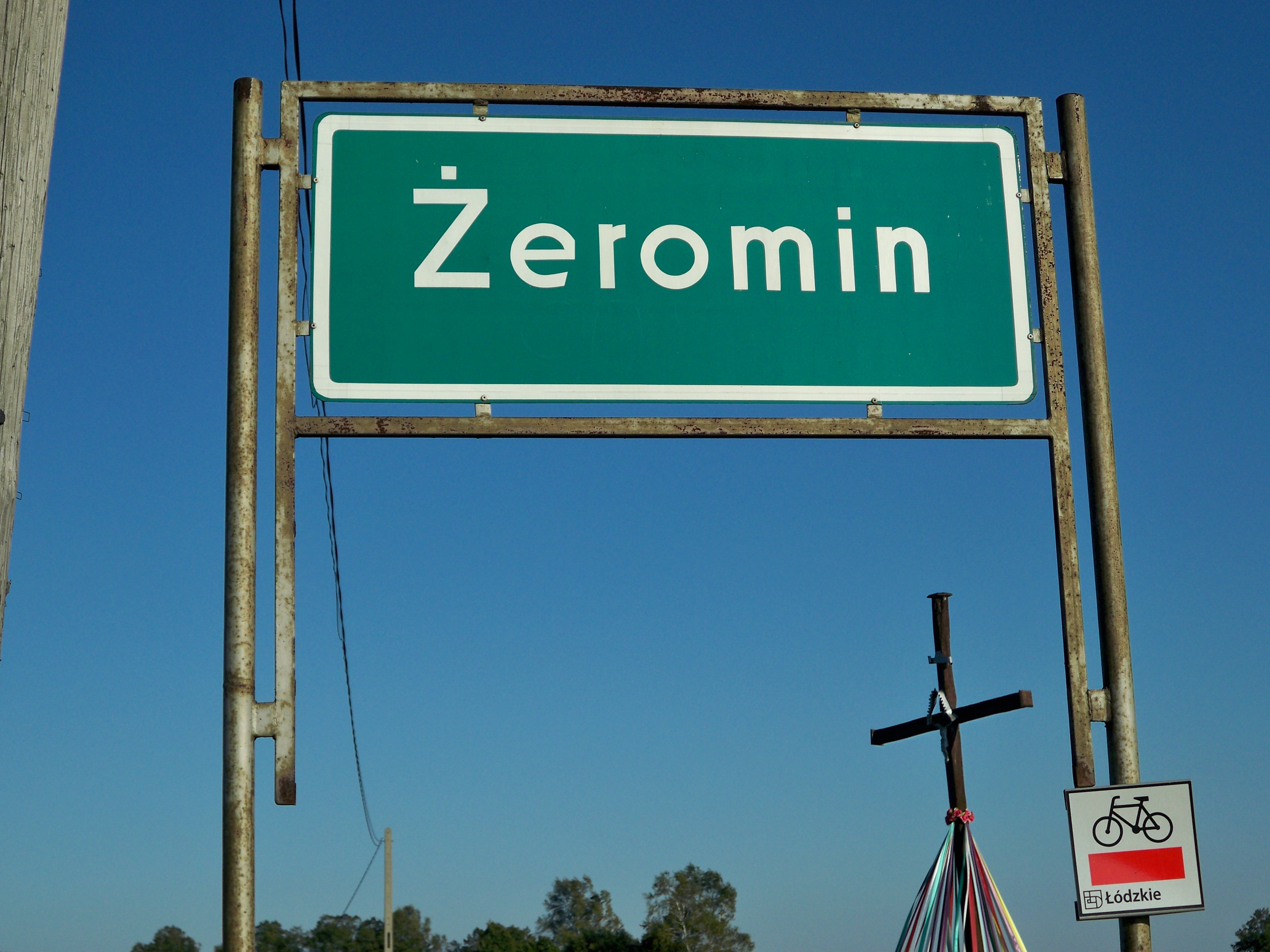

- Location within Poland
- Coordinates: 51°36′N 19°36′E
- Country: Poland
- Voivodeship: Łódź
- County: Łódź East
- Gmina: Tuszyn

Żeromin [ʐɛˈrɔmin] is a village in the administrative district of Gmina Tuszyn, within Łódź East County, Łódź Voivodeship, in central Poland.
