= Głuchów, Łódź East County =

Głuchów
- Village
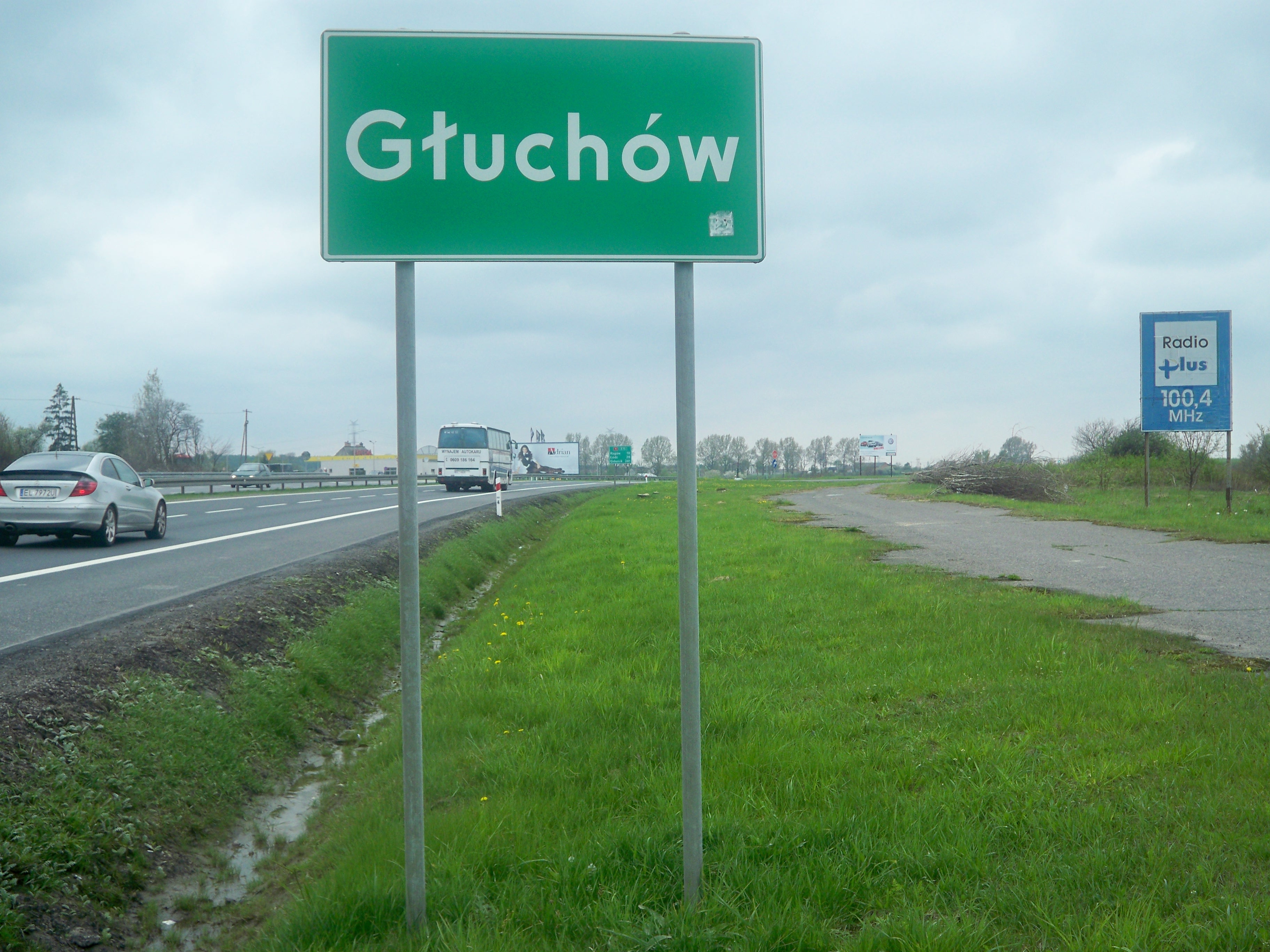

- Location within Poland
- Coordinates: 51°34′N 19°36′E
- Country: Poland
- Voivodeship: Łódź
- County: Łódź East
- Gmina: Tuszyn

Głuchów [ˈɡwuxuf] is a village in the administrative district of Gmina Tuszyn, within Łódź East County, Łódź Voivodeship, in central Poland.
