= Zielona Góra (disambiguation) =

Zielona Góra may refer to the following places:

- Zielona Góra, Greater Poland Voivodeship (west-central Poland)
- Zielona Góra, Łódź Voivodeship (central Poland)
- Zielona Góra in Lubusz Voivodeship (west Poland)
- Zielona Góra, Pomeranian Voivodeship (north Poland)

== See also ==
- Zielonagóra, in Szamotuły County, Greater Poland Voivodeship
