= Helen Colin =

Polish-born American Holocaust survivor (born 1923)

Helen Colin, born Hela Goldstein (April 15, 1923 - July 22, 2016) was a Jewish survivor of the Holocaust. On April 24, 1945, she gave the first audio-visual testimony provided by a Holocaust survivor.

== Early life ==
Helen Colin was born Hela Goldstein in Tuszyn, Poland to Miriam (Fried) and Joseph Goldstein. She had an older sister, Stefa, an older brother, Romek, and a younger sister, Celine (Selinka).

== The Holocaust ==
After the Nazis invaded Poland, Colin's father applied for visas to enter Israel, then the British Mandate of Palestine. Colin's sister, Stefa, contracted appendicitis the night before their departure and the family missed their ship.

The Goldsteins were forced into the Łódź Ghetto in 1942. Joseph Goldstein died while in the ghetto. His body was found by Colin and Stefa Goldstein in a pile of corpses after he did not return home after a day of forced labour.

Colin married Kopel Colin while in the ghetto.

During the 1944 liquidation of the ghetto, Colin, her husband, mother, and siblings were sent to Auschwitz where her mother, brother, and sister, Selinka, were murdered in the gas chambers.

Colin and her sister, Stefa, were selected as slave laborers and were moved between various concentration camps. Colin contracted typhus, but survived.

The sisters were last enslaved at Bergen-Belsen until its liberation on April 15, 1945.

== Testimony ==
On April 24, 1945, the British Army Film and Photographic unit filmed Colin as she spoke about her experiences. At the time, she was standing near a mass grave holding over 5,000 bodies.

Colin's testimony was the first audio-visual account provided by a victim of the Holocaust.

== Post-Holocaust ==
Colin and Stefa were sent to a displaced persons camp in Germany where Colin's husband, Kopel, located them.

Hela and Kopel Colin immigrated to America in late 1946. They briefly lived in New York before moving to Houston where they opened a jewelry store.

The couple had two daughters, Muriel and Jeanie.

Hela, who was later known as Helen, continued to tell her story and recorded interviews for the USC Shoah Foundation and the Holocaust Museum Houston.

Her memoir, My Dream of Freedom: From Holocaust to My Beloved America, was published in March 2013.

== Death ==
Colin died on July 22, 2016, at the age of 93.

== Publications ==
My Dream of Freedom: From Holocaust to My Beloved America, March 24, 2013
