= Kraszew, Łódź East County =

Kraszew
- Village
- Location within Poland
- Coordinates: 51°42′59″N 19°38′59″E
- Country: Poland
- Voivodeship: Łódź
- County: Łódź East
- Gmina: Andrespol
- Population: 425

Kraszew [ˈkraʂɛf] is a village in the administrative district of Gmina Andrespol, within Łódź East County, Łódź Voivodeship, in central Poland.
