= Dylew, Łódź Voivodeship =

Dylew
- Village
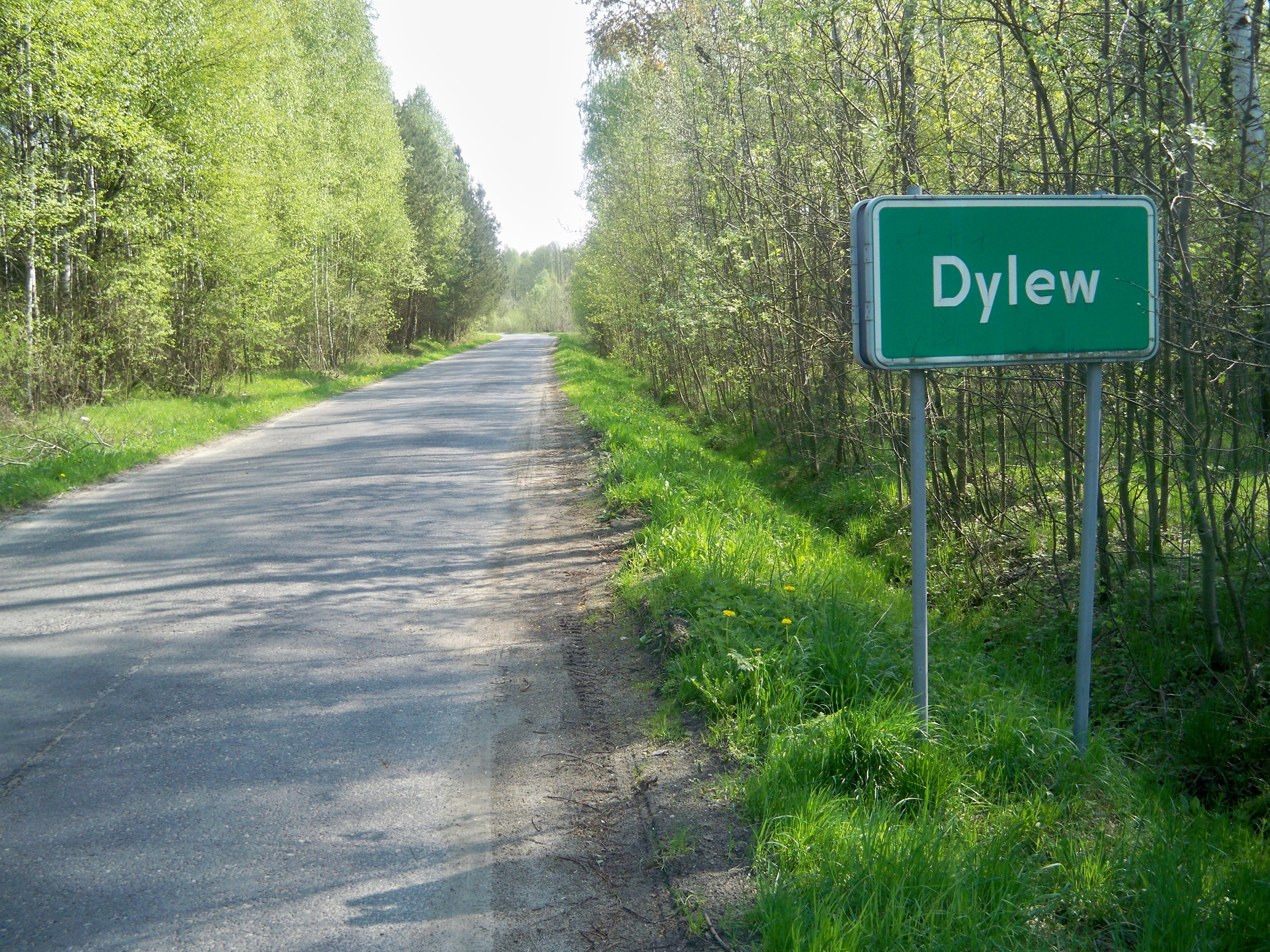

- Location within Poland
- Coordinates: 51°35′N 19°29′E
- Country: Poland
- Voivodeship: Łódź
- County: Łódź East
- Gmina: Tuszyn

Dylew [ˈdɨlɛf] is a village in the administrative district of Gmina Tuszyn, within Łódź East County, Łódź Voivodeship, in central Poland.
