= Kruszów =

- Village
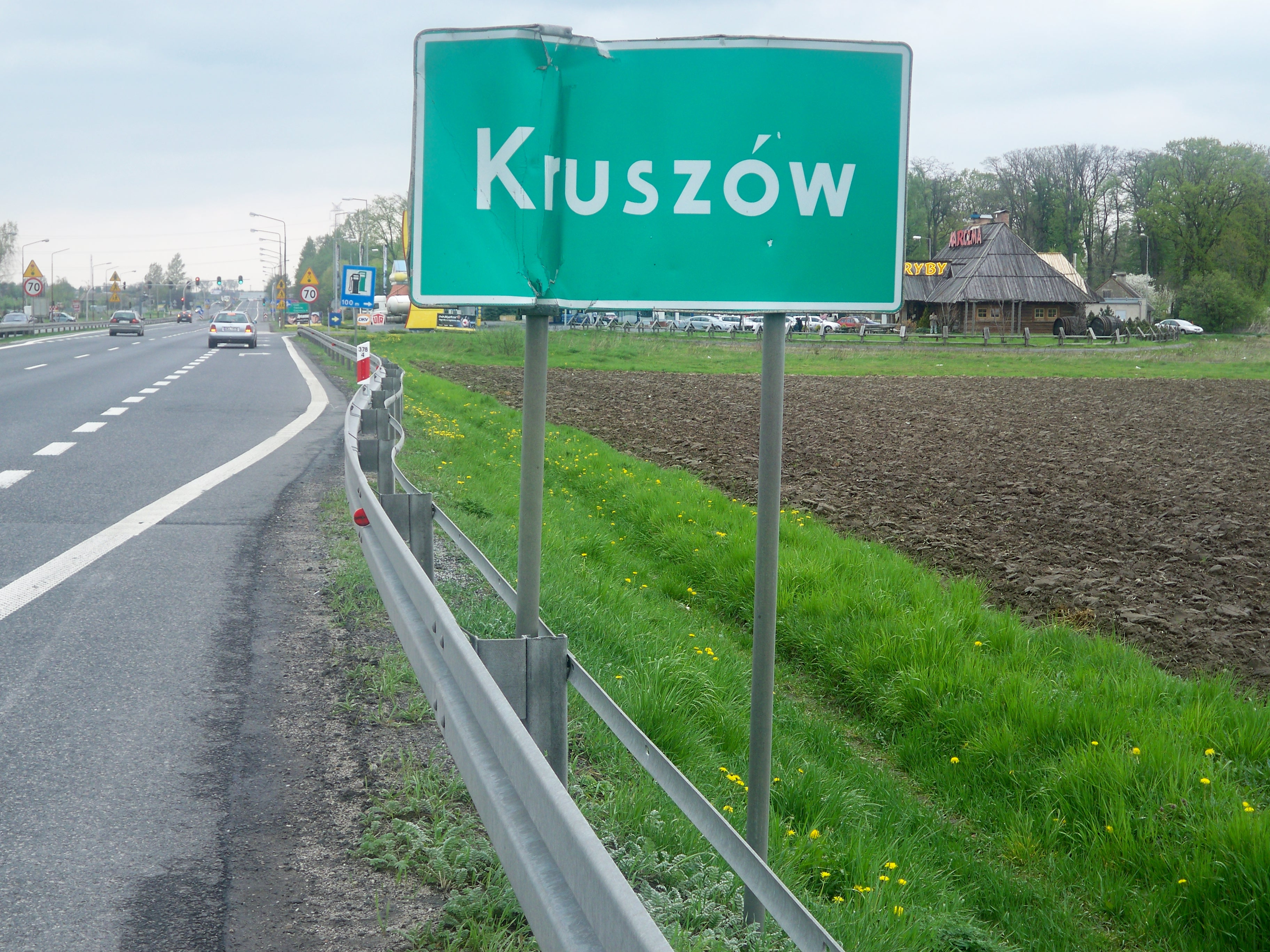

- Location within Poland
- Coordinates: 51°35′N 19°34′E
- Country: Poland
- Voivodeship: Łódź
- County: Łódź East
- Gmina: Tuszyn

Kruszów [ˈkruʂuf] is a village in the administrative district of Gmina Tuszyn, within Łódź East County, Łódź Voivodeship, in central Poland.
