= Szczukwin =

- Village
- Location within Poland
- Coordinates: 51°33′19″N 19°31′52″E
- Country: Poland
- Voivodeship: Łódź
- County: Łódź East
- Gmina: Tuszyn

Szczukwin [ˈʂt͡ʂukfin] is a village in the administrative district of Gmina Tuszyn, within Łódź East County, Łódź Voivodeship, in central Poland. The village dates back to at least the 16th century.
