= Wiśniowa Góra =

- Village
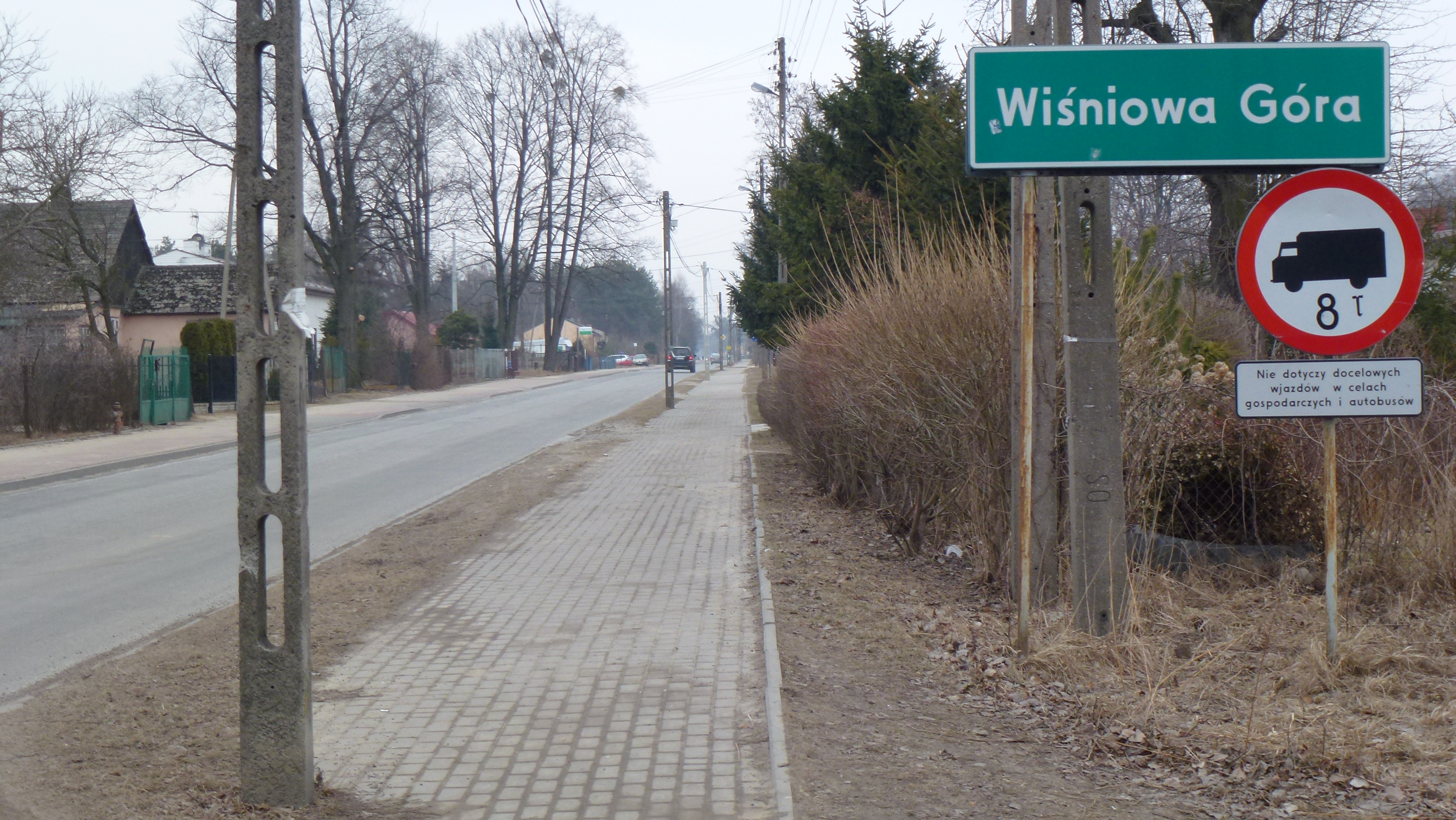

- Location within Poland
- Coordinates: 51°43′N 19°38′E
- Country: Poland
- Voivodeship: Łódź
- County: Łódź East
- Gmina: Andrespol
- Population: 2,485

Wiśniowa Góra [viɕˈɲɔva ˈɡura] is a village in the administrative district of Gmina Andrespol, within Łódź East County, Łódź Voivodeship, in central Poland.
