= Bedoń Przykościelny =

- Village
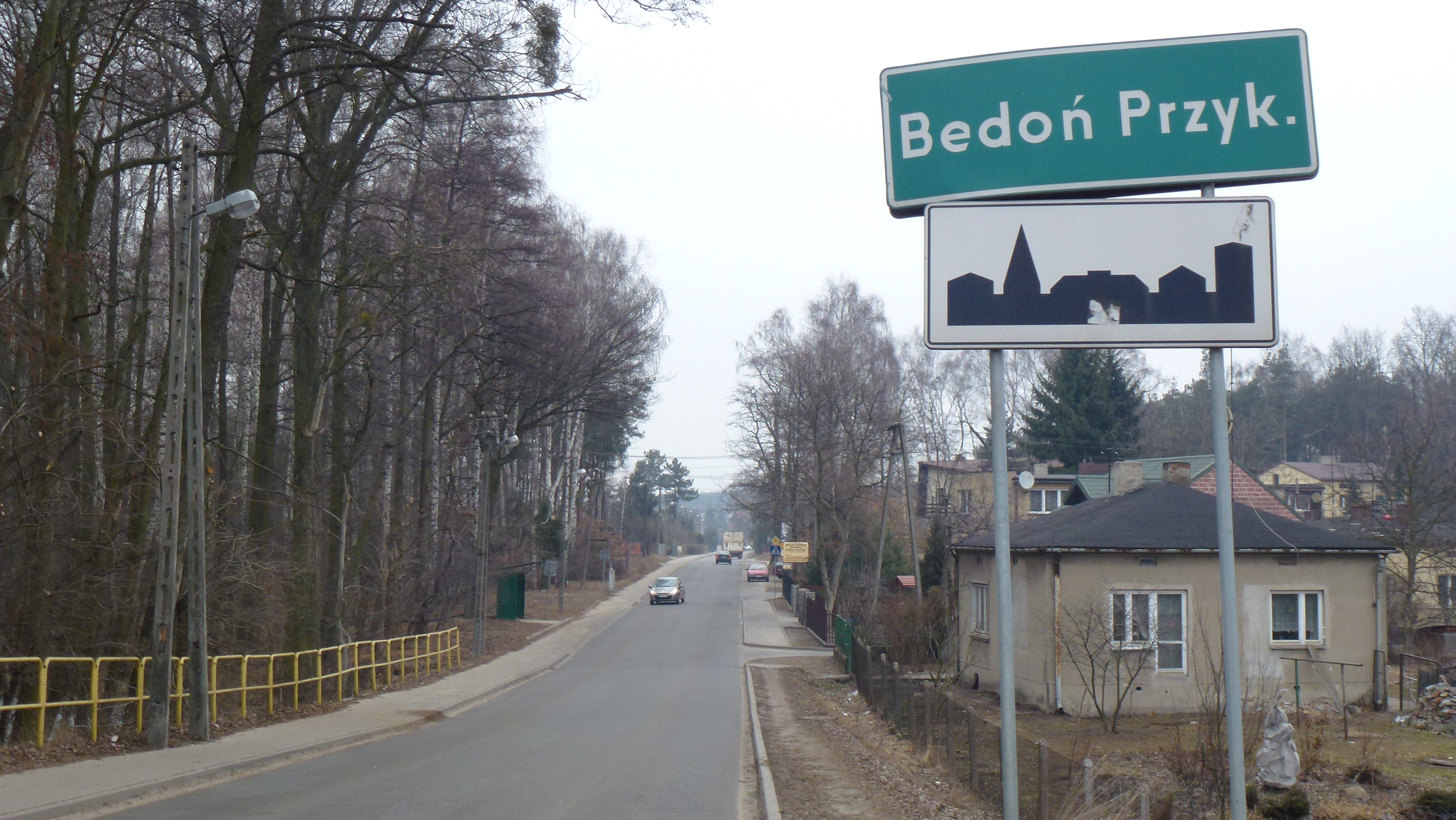

- Location within Poland
- Coordinates: 51°44′24″N 19°37′48″E
- Country: Poland
- Voivodeship: Łódź
- County: Łódź East
- Gmina: Andrespol
- Population: 1,289

Bedoń Przykościelny [ˈbɛdɔɲ pʂɨkɔɕˈt͡ɕɛlnɨ] is a village in the administrative district of Gmina Andrespol, within Łódź East County, Łódź Voivodeship, in central Poland.

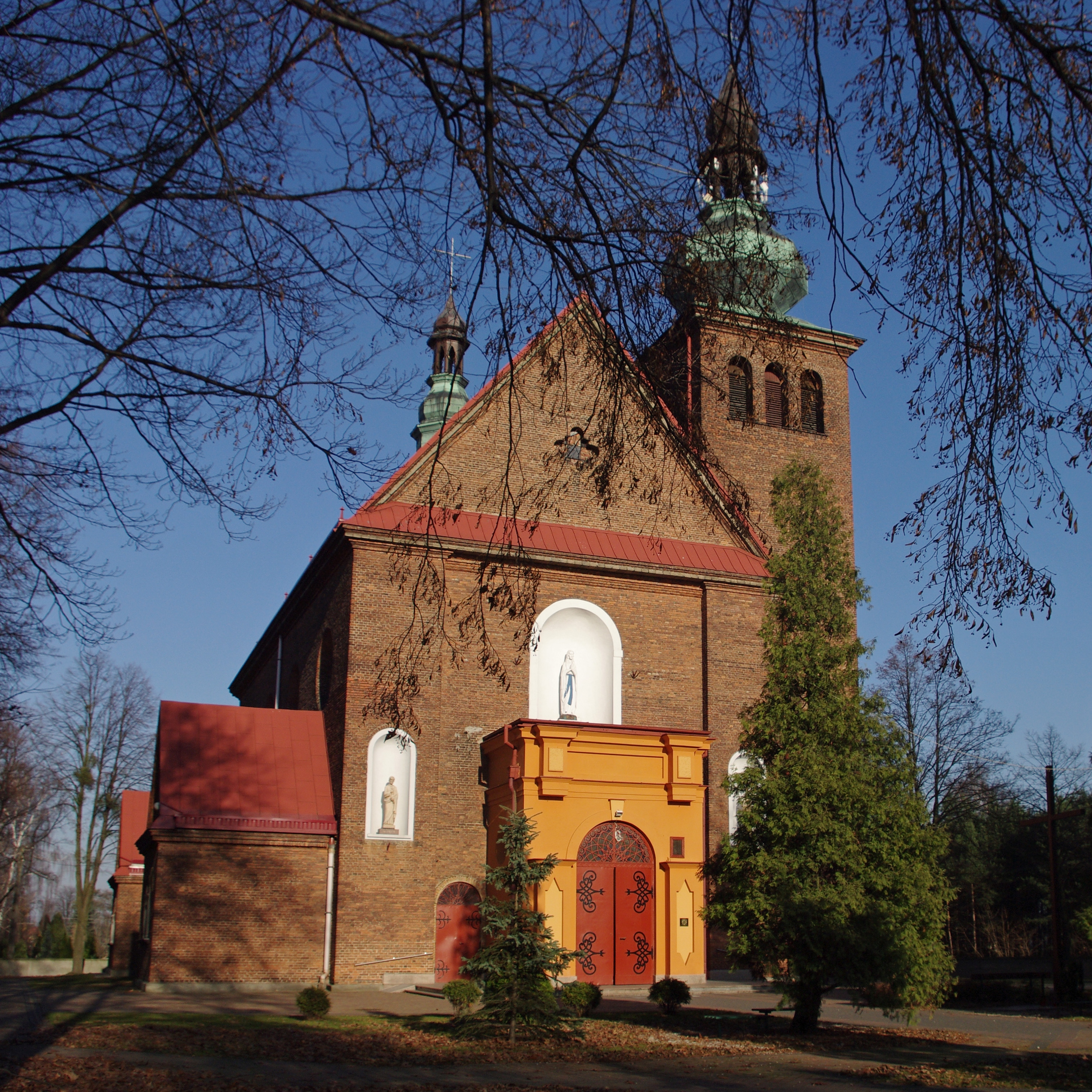
Church of Our Lady in Bedoń
