= Gołygów =

- Village
- Location within Poland
- Coordinates: 51°33′35″N 19°35′4″E
- Country: Poland
- Voivodeship: Łódź
- County: Łódź East
- Gmina: Tuszyn
- Population: 120

Gołygów [ɡɔˈwɨɡuf] is a village in the administrative district of Gmina Tuszyn, within Łódź East County, Łódź Voivodeship, in central Poland.
