= Tuszynek Majoracki =

- Village
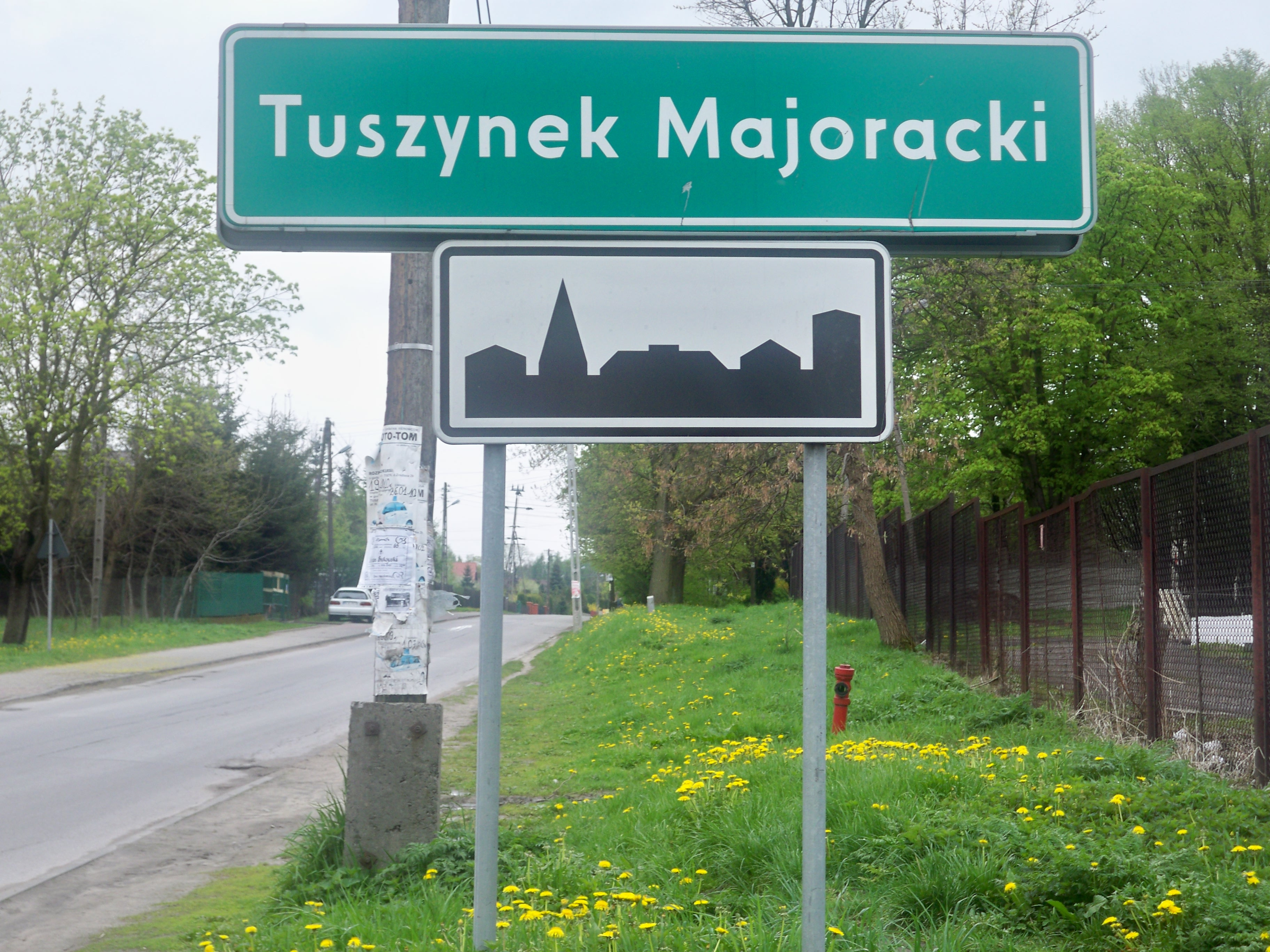

- Location within Poland
- Coordinates: 51°35′46″N 19°33′02″E
- Country: Poland
- Voivodeship: Łódź
- County: Łódź East
- Gmina: Tuszyn

Tuszynek Majoracki [tuˈʂɨnɛk majɔˈrat͡ski] is a village in the administrative district of Gmina Tuszyn, within Łódź East County, Łódź Voivodeship, in central Poland.

== Climate ==
Tuszynek Majoracki has a humid continental climate (Cfb in the Köppen climate classification).

Climate data for Tuszynek Majoracki
Month	Jan	Feb	Mar	Apr	May	Jun	Jul	Aug	Sep	Oct	Nov	Dec	Year
Mean daily maximum °C (°F)	0.2 (32.4)	2.1 (35.8)	6.9 (44.4)	13.5 (56.3)	18.3 (64.9)	21.6 (70.9)	23.6 (74.5)	23.4 (74.1)	18.5 (65.3)	12.6 (54.7)	7.1 (44.8)	2.4 (36.3)	12.5 (54.5)
Daily mean °C (°F)	−2.0 (28.4)	−0.8 (30.6)	3.0 (37.4)	8.9 (48.0)	14.0 (57.2)	17.4 (63.3)	19.5 (67.1)	19.1 (66.4)	14.4 (57.9)	9.3 (48.7)	4.7 (40.5)	0.4 (32.7)	9.0 (48.2)
Mean daily minimum °C (°F)	−4.4 (24.1)	−3.8 (25.2)	−0.9 (30.4)	3.9 (39.0)	9.0 (48.2)	12.6 (54.7)	15.0 (59.0)	14.6 (58.3)	10.5 (50.9)	6.1 (43.0)	2.3 (36.1)	−1.7 (28.9)	5.3 (41.5)
Average precipitation mm (inches)	48 (1.9)	43 (1.7)	52 (2.0)	51 (2.0)	73 (2.9)	73 (2.9)	96 (3.8)	65 (2.6)	63 (2.5)	49 (1.9)	48 (1.9)	50 (2.0)	711 (28.1)
Source: https://en.climate-data.org/europe/poland/łodz-voivodeship/tuszynek-majoracki-859662/
