= Modlica, Łódź Voivodeship =

Modlica
- Village
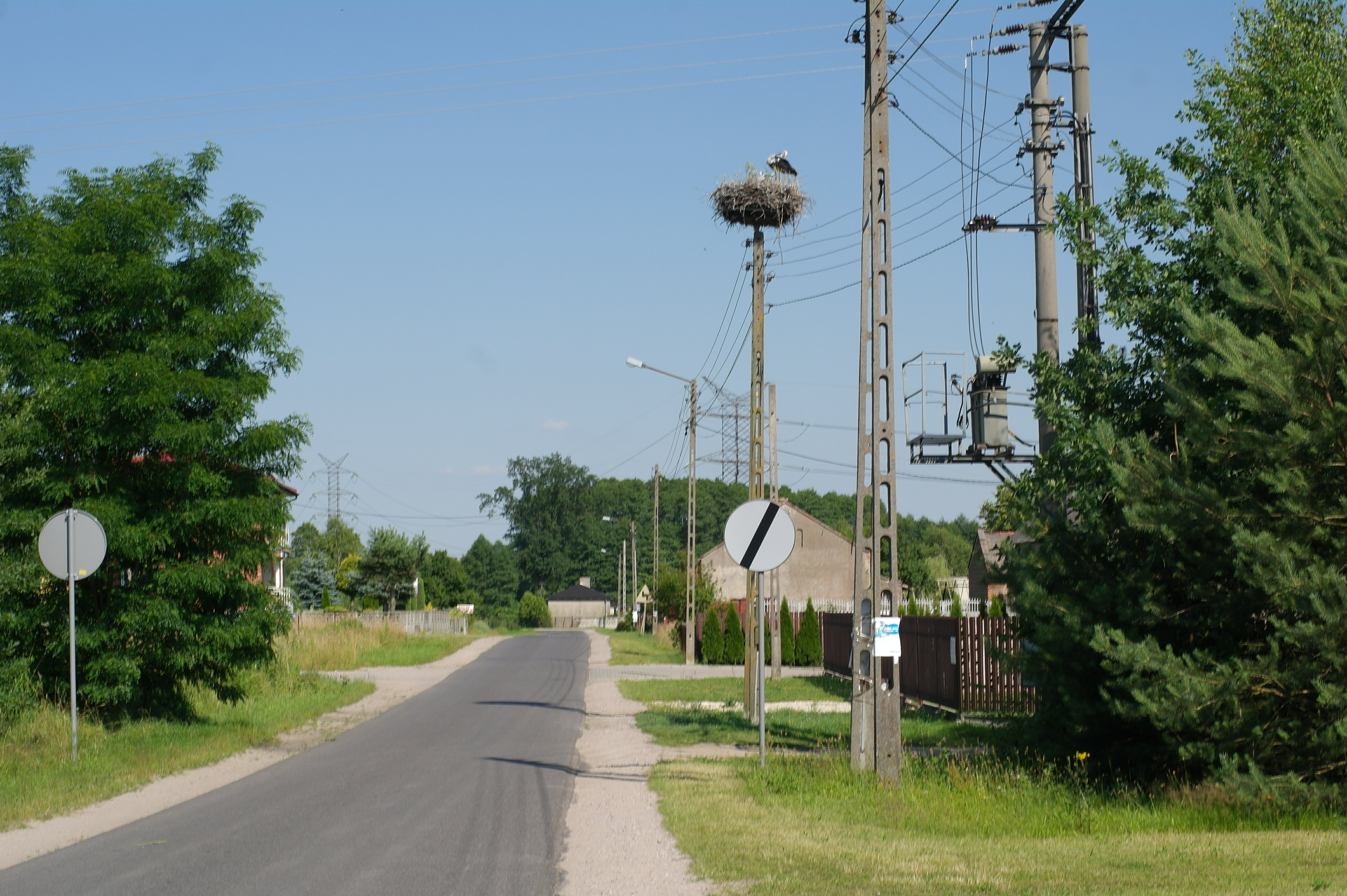

- Location within Poland
- Coordinates: 51°38′N 19°33′E
- Country: Poland
- Voivodeship: Łódź
- County: Łódź East
- Gmina: Tuszyn

Modlica [mɔdˈlit͡sa] is a village in the administrative district of Gmina Tuszyn, within Łódź East County, Łódź Voivodeship, in central Poland.
