= Wola Kazubowa =

- Village
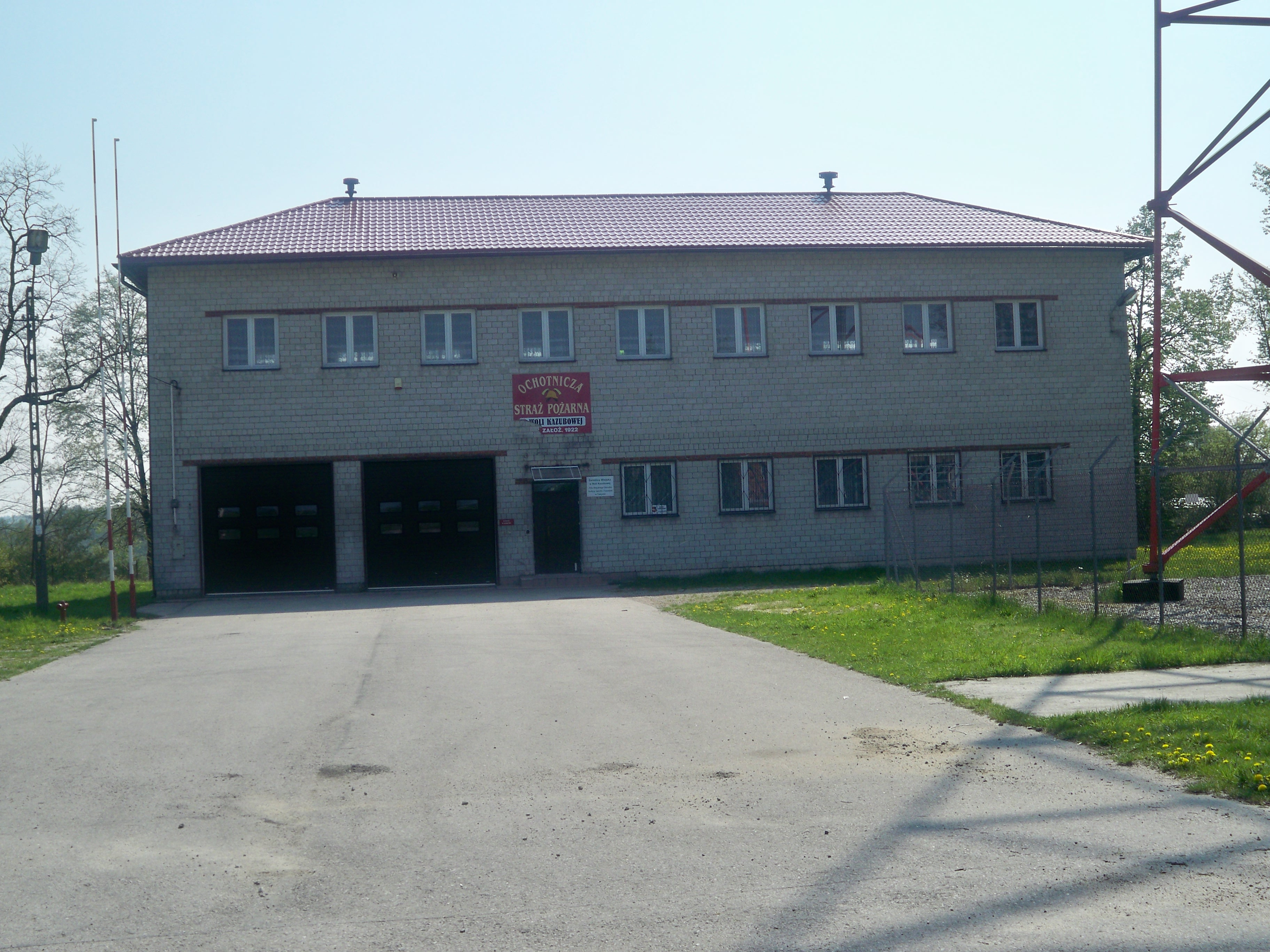

- Location within Poland
- Coordinates: 51°34′43″N 19°28′35″E
- Country: Poland
- Voivodeship: Łódź
- County: Łódź East
- Gmina: Tuszyn

Wola Kazubowa [ˈvɔla kazuˈbɔva] is a village in the administrative district of Gmina Tuszyn, within Łódź East County, Łódź Voivodeship, in central Poland.
