= Jutroszew =

- Village
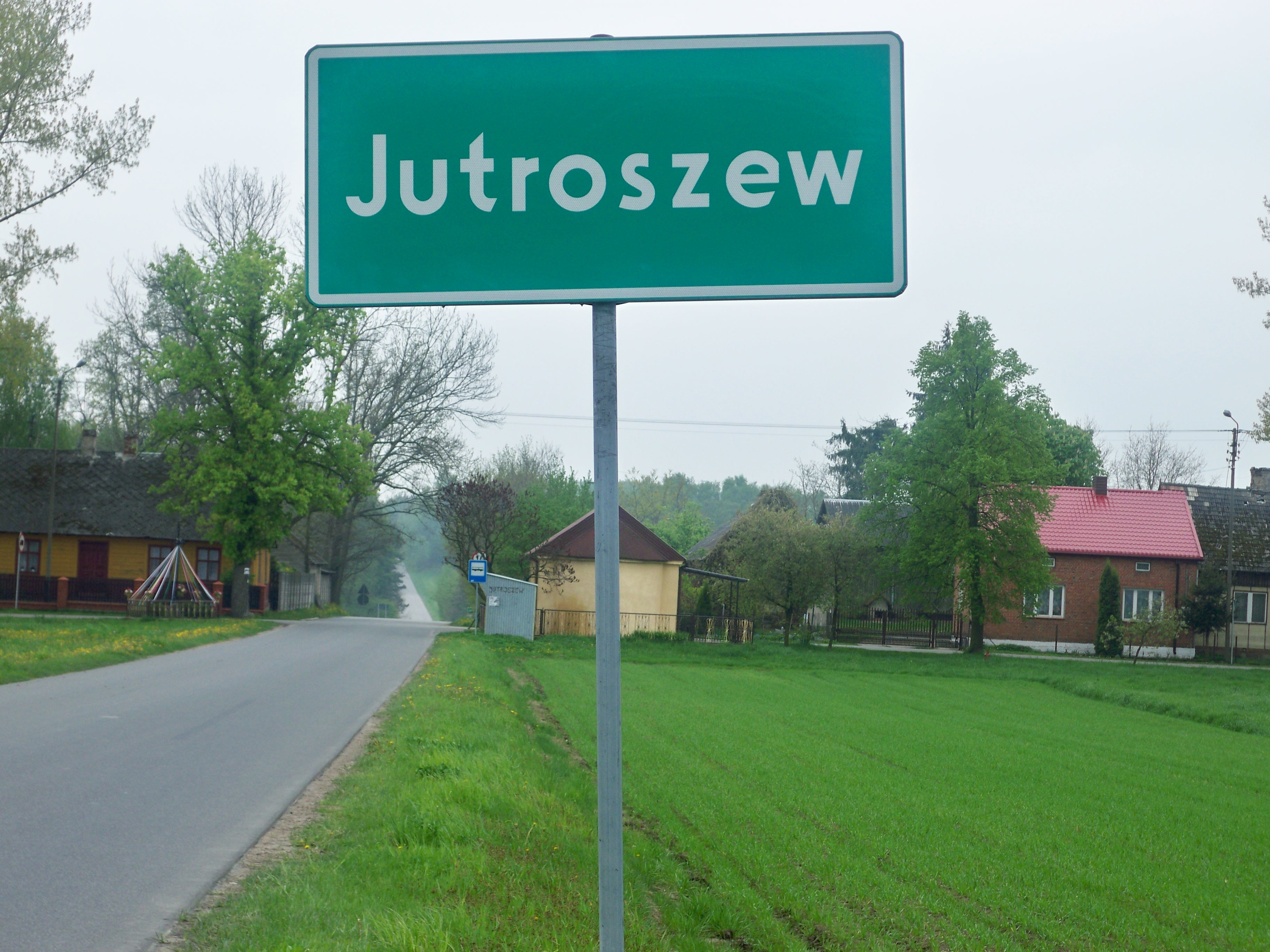
- Street and road sign of Jutroszew

- Location within Poland
- Coordinates: 51°32′52.8″N 19°29′00.8″E
- Country: Poland
- Voivodeship: Łódź
- County: Łódź East
- Gmina: Tuszyn

Jutroszew [juˈtrɔʂɛf] is a village in the administrative district of Gmina Tuszyn, within Łódź East County, Łódź Voivodeship, in central Poland.
