= Rydzynki =

- Village
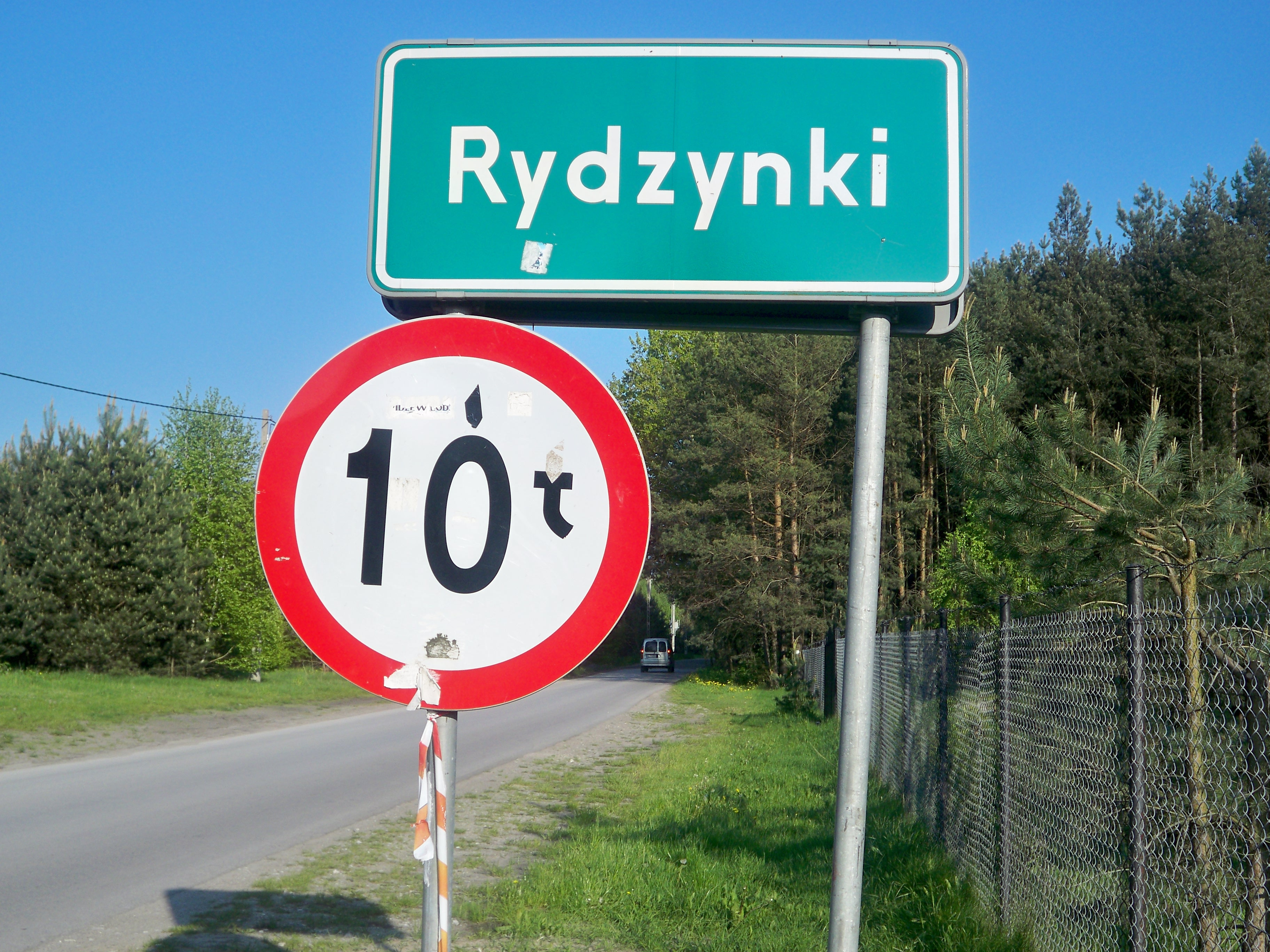

- Location within Poland
- Coordinates: 51°37′N 19°28′E
- Country: Poland
- Voivodeship: Łódź
- County: Łódź East
- Gmina: Tuszyn
- Website: http://www.rydzynki.yoyo.pl

Rydzynki [rɨˈd͡zɨŋki] is a village in the administrative district of Gmina Tuszyn, within Łódź East County, Łódź Voivodeship, in central Poland.
