= Wodzin Majoracki =

- Village
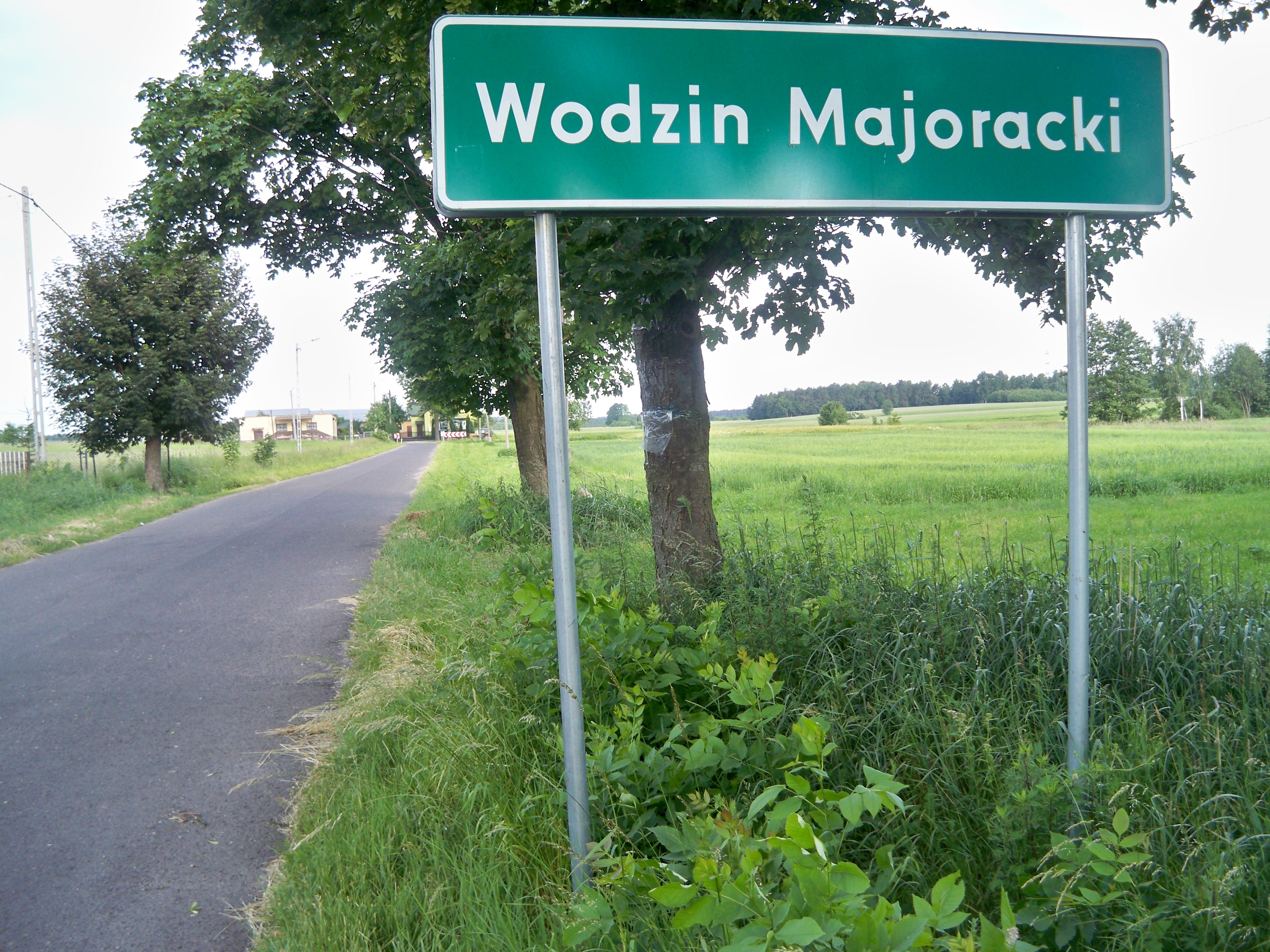

- Location within Poland
- Coordinates: 51°31′56″N 19°34′11″E
- Country: Poland
- Voivodeship: Łódź
- County: Łódź East
- Gmina: Tuszyn

Wodzin Majoracki [ˈvɔd͡ʑin majɔˈrat͡ski] is a village in the administrative district of Gmina Tuszyn, within Łódź East County, Łódź Voivodeship, in central Poland.
