= Zofiówka =

Zofiówka may refer to:

- Zofiówka, Russian Trochenbrod, a Polish Jewish shtetl, now located in Ukraine
- Sofiyivsky Park in central Ukraine
- Zofiówka, Grajewo County in Podlaskie Voivodeship (north-east Poland)
- Zofiówka, Mońki County in Podlaskie Voivodeship (north-east Poland)
- Zofiówka, Bełchatów County in Łódź Voivodeship (central Poland)
- Zofiówka, Łódź East County in Łódź Voivodeship (central Poland)
- Zofiówka, Lublin Voivodeship (east Poland)
- Zofiówka, Busko County in Świętokrzyskie Voivodeship (south-central Poland)
- Zofiówka, Staszów County in Świętokrzyskie Voivodeship (south-central Poland)
- Zofiówka, Grójec County in Masovian Voivodeship (east-central Poland)
- Zofiówka, Lipsko County in Masovian Voivodeship (east-central Poland)
- Zofiówka, Płock County in Masovian Voivodeship (east-central Poland)
- Zofiówka, Sochaczew County in Masovian Voivodeship (east-central Poland)
- Zofiówka, Greater Poland Voivodeship (west-central Poland)
- Zofiówka, Warmian-Masurian Voivodeship (north Poland)
- Zofiówka, coal mine in Jastrzębie-Zdrój, Poland
- Zofiówka, former colony, in the Wodzisław State country
