= Bedoń-Wieś =

- Village
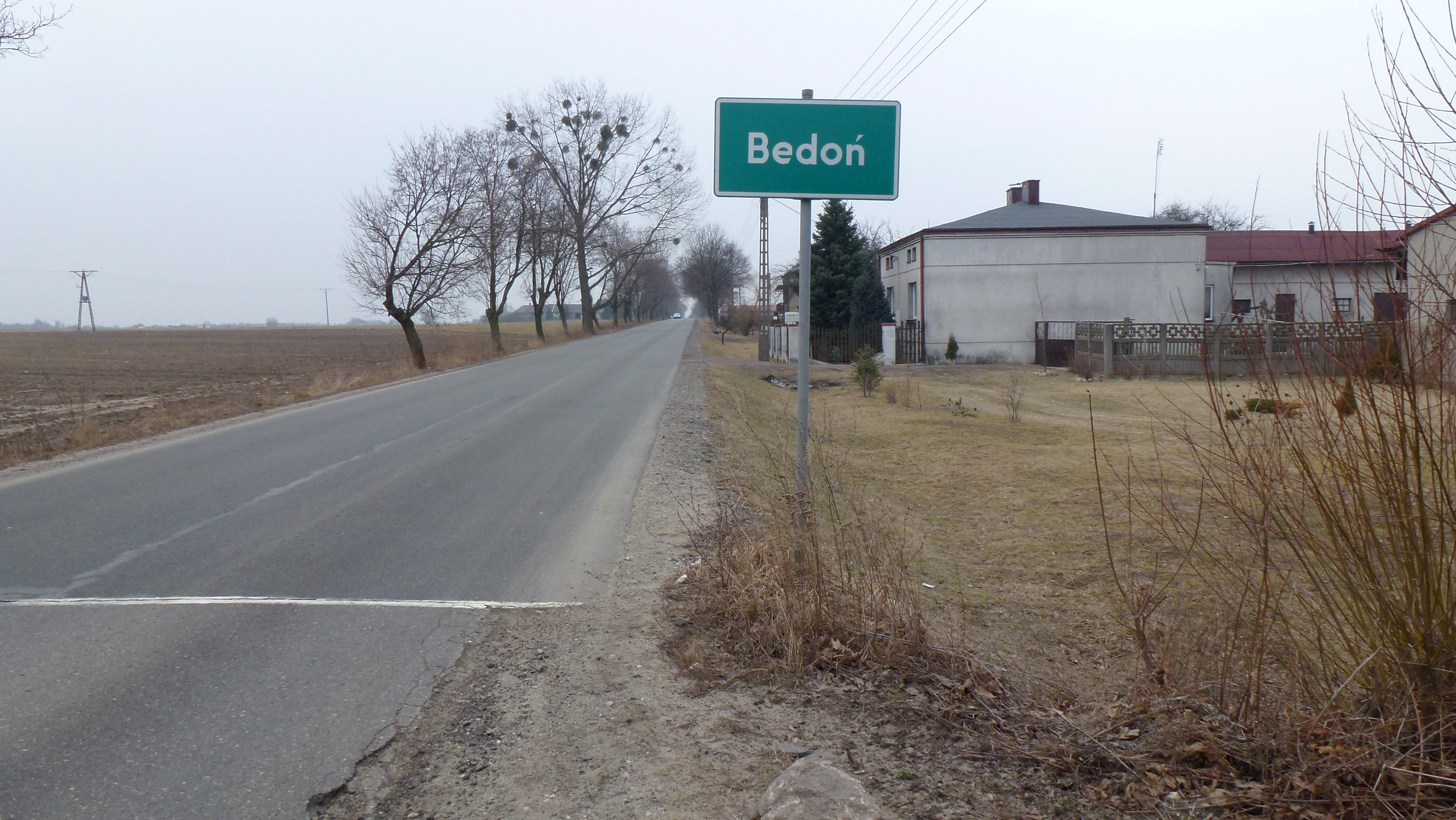

- Location within Poland
- Coordinates: 51°44′57″N 19°38′11″E
- Country: Poland
- Voivodeship: Łódź
- County: Łódź East
- Gmina: Andrespol
- Population: 346

Bedoń-Wieś [ˈbɛdɔɲ ˈvjɛɕ] is a village in the administrative district of Gmina Andrespol, within Łódź East County, Łódź Voivodeship, in central Poland.
