= Wodzinek =

- Village
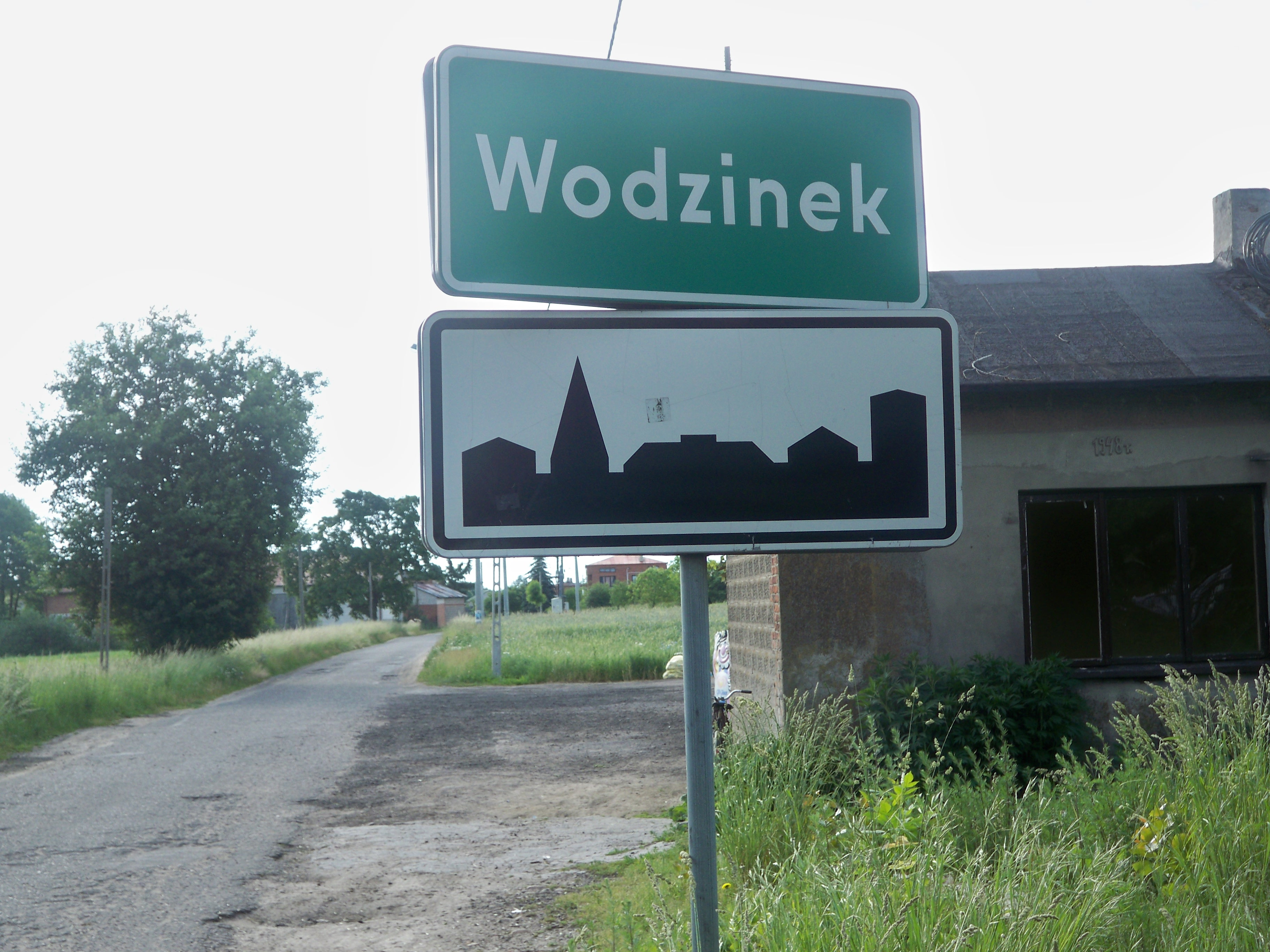

- Location within Poland
- Coordinates: 51°32′N 19°36′E
- Country: Poland
- Voivodeship: Łódź
- County: Łódź East
- Gmina: Tuszyn
- Population: 200

Wodzinek [vɔˈd͡ʑinɛk] is a village in the administrative district of Gmina Tuszyn, within Łódź East County, Łódź Voivodeship, in central Poland.
