= Syski, Łódź East County =

Syski
- Village
- Location within Poland
- Coordinates: 51°31′N 19°33′E
- Country: Poland
- Voivodeship: Łódź
- County: Łódź East
- Gmina: Tuszyn

Syski [ˈsɨski] is a village in the administrative district of Gmina Tuszyn, within Łódź East County, Łódź Voivodeship, in central Poland.
