= Mąkoszyn =

Mąkoszyn may refer to the following places:

- Mąkoszyn, Greater Poland Voivodeship (west-central Poland)
- Mąkoszyn, Kuyavian-Pomeranian Voivodeship (north-central Poland)
- Mąkoszyn, Łódź Voivodeship (central Poland)

== See also ==
- Makoszyn
