= Zofiówka, Łódź East County =

Zofiówka
- Village
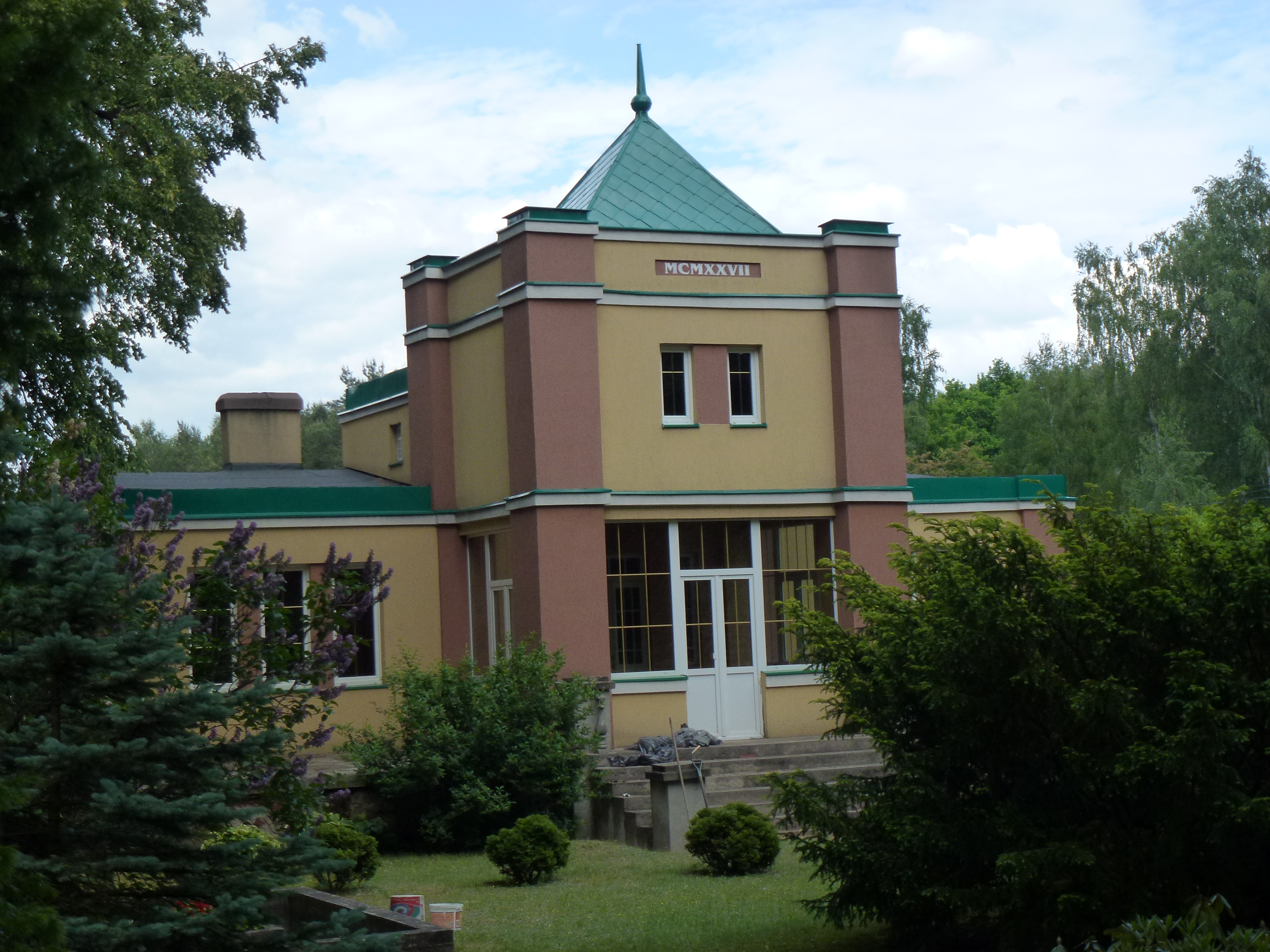

- Location within Poland
- Coordinates: 51°36′N 19°28′E
- Country: Poland
- Voivodeship: Łódź
- County: Łódź East
- Gmina: Tuszyn

Zofiówka [zɔˈfjufka] is a village in the administrative district of Gmina Tuszyn, within Łódź East County, Łódź Voivodeship, in central Poland.
