= Andrespol =

- Village
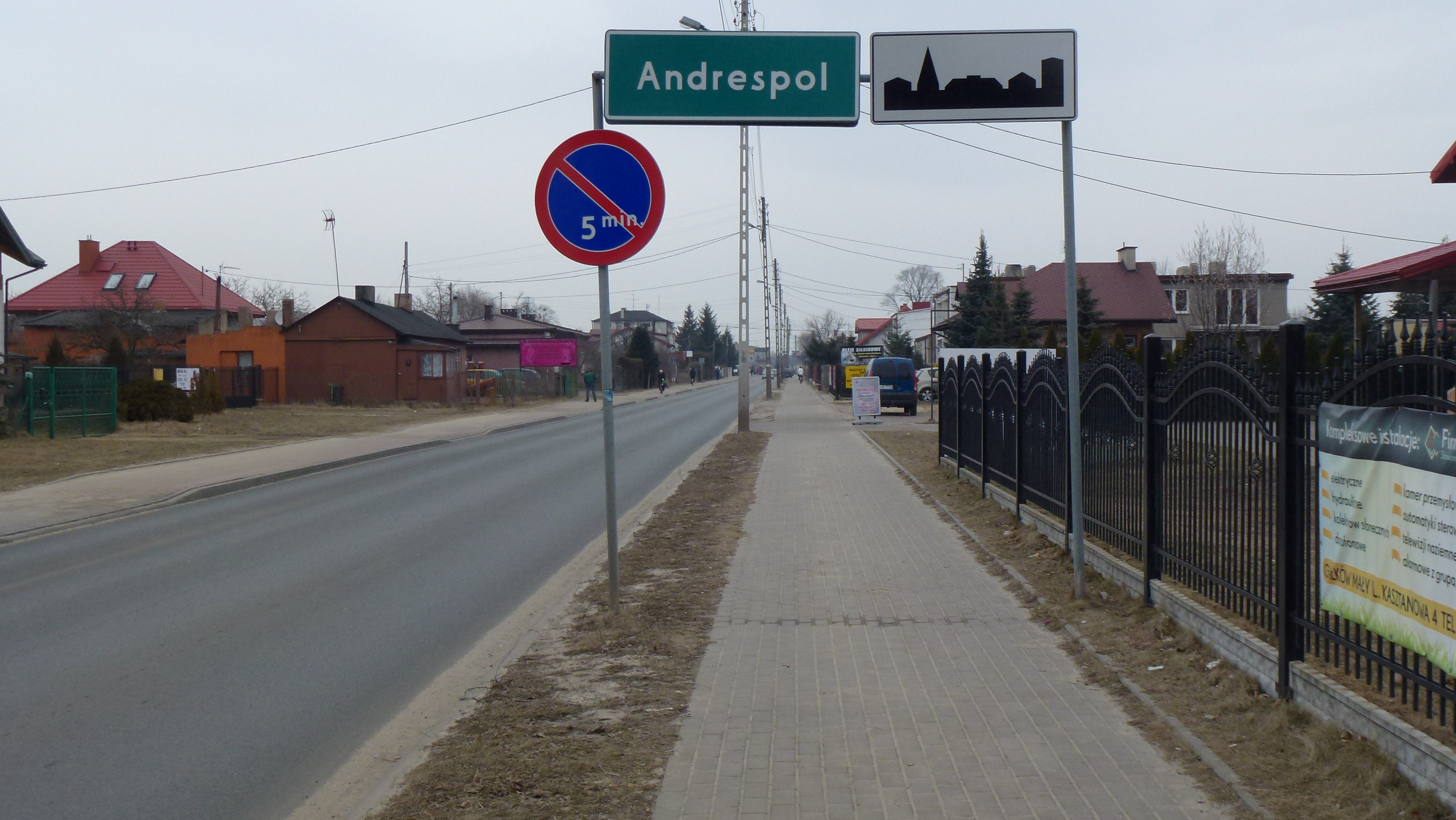

- Location within Poland
- Coordinates: 51°43′28″N 19°38′16″E
- Country: Poland
- Voivodeship: Łódź
- County: Łódź East
- Gmina: Andrespol
- Population: 3,367

Andrespol [anˈdrɛspɔl] is a village in Łódź East County, Łódź Voivodeship, in central Poland. It is the seat of the gmina (administrative district) called Gmina Andrespol.

On 20 October 1807, Magdalena von Jordan-Tuchecka from Bedoń signed a settlement agreement with 29 settler families of Low German descent from Pomerania. The settlers had already come to the region during the Prussian rule (1793-1806), probably around 1805. The newly created village was initially given the German name Andreasfeld. It consisted of 29 hooves for the settlers, other hooves were to be divided between the teacher and the village mayor. The colonists were promised six years of freedom from taxation during which they were to clear their land and build residential and commercial buildings from their own funds.

In 1807 the region had become a part of the newly established Duchy of Warsaw and from 1815 it was part of Congress Poland. The Protestant church was destroyed 1945.
