= Straja (disambiguation) =

Straja may refer to several places in Romania:

- Straja, a mountain resort in Hunedoara County
- Straja, Suceava, a commune in Suceava County
- Straja, a village in Berghin Commune, Alba County
- Straja, a village in Căpușu Mare Commune, Cluj County
- Straja, a village in Cojocna Commune, Cluj County
- Straja, a village in Asău Commune, Bacău County
- Straja, a village in Cumpăna Commune, Constanța County
- Straja, a village in Tarcău Commune, Neamț County

And to:

- Straja Țării, a paramilitary youth organization in Romania (1935–1940)

== See also ==
- Straža (disambiguation)
- Strazha (disambiguation)
