= Dunaj, Krško =

Dunaj
- Location in Slovenia
- Coordinates: 45°58′40.93″N 15°27′11.2″E
- Country: Slovenia
- Traditional region: Lower Carniola
- Statistical region: Lower Sava
- Municipality: Krško

Area
  - Total: 0.64 km^{2} (0.25 sq mi)
- Elevation: 390.6 m (1,281 ft)

Population (2002)
  - Total: 38
- Postal code: 8270

Dunaj (pronounced [ˈduːnai̯]) is a small settlement in the hills above the right bank of the Sava River in the Municipality of Krško in eastern Slovenia. The area is part of the traditional region of Lower Carniola. It is now included with the rest of the municipality in the Lower Sava Statistical Region.

== History ==
Late Neolithic, Bronze, Iron Age, and Roman graves have been found in the area and show continuous settlement of the site.

During the Second World War, the Slovene population of the village was evicted and Gottschee Germans were settled in their place. The village was joined with neighboring Straža pri Krškem, and the two villages were jointly renamed Lorenzberg.
