= Stróża, Łódź East County =

Stróża
- Village
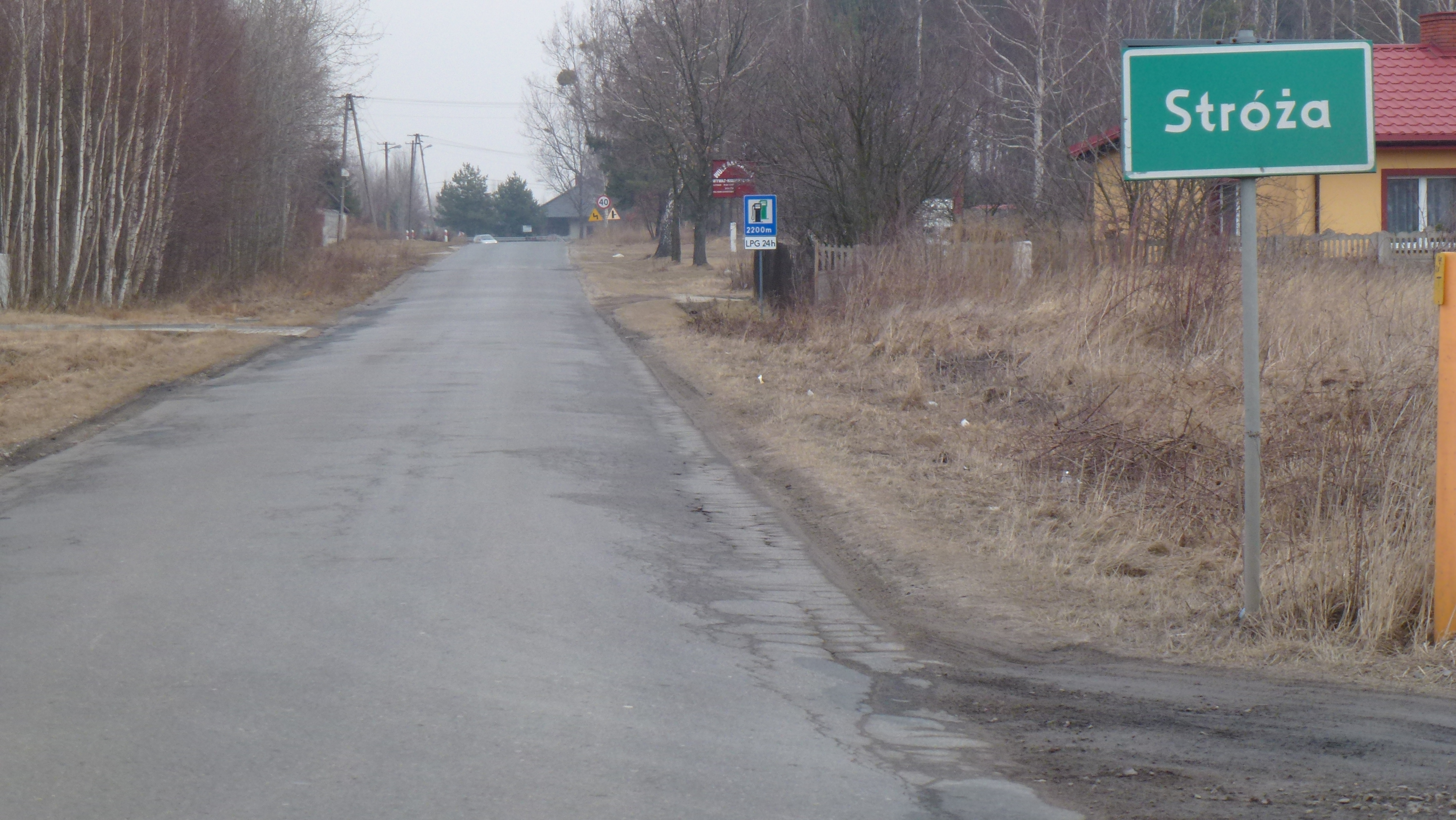

- Location within Poland
- Coordinates: 51°41′42″N 19°37′9″E
- Country: Poland
- Voivodeship: Łódź
- County: Łódź East
- Gmina: Andrespol
- Population: 548

Stróża [ˈstruʐa] is a village in the administrative district of Gmina Andrespol, within Łódź East County, Łódź Voivodeship, in central Poland.
