= Bądzyń =

- Village
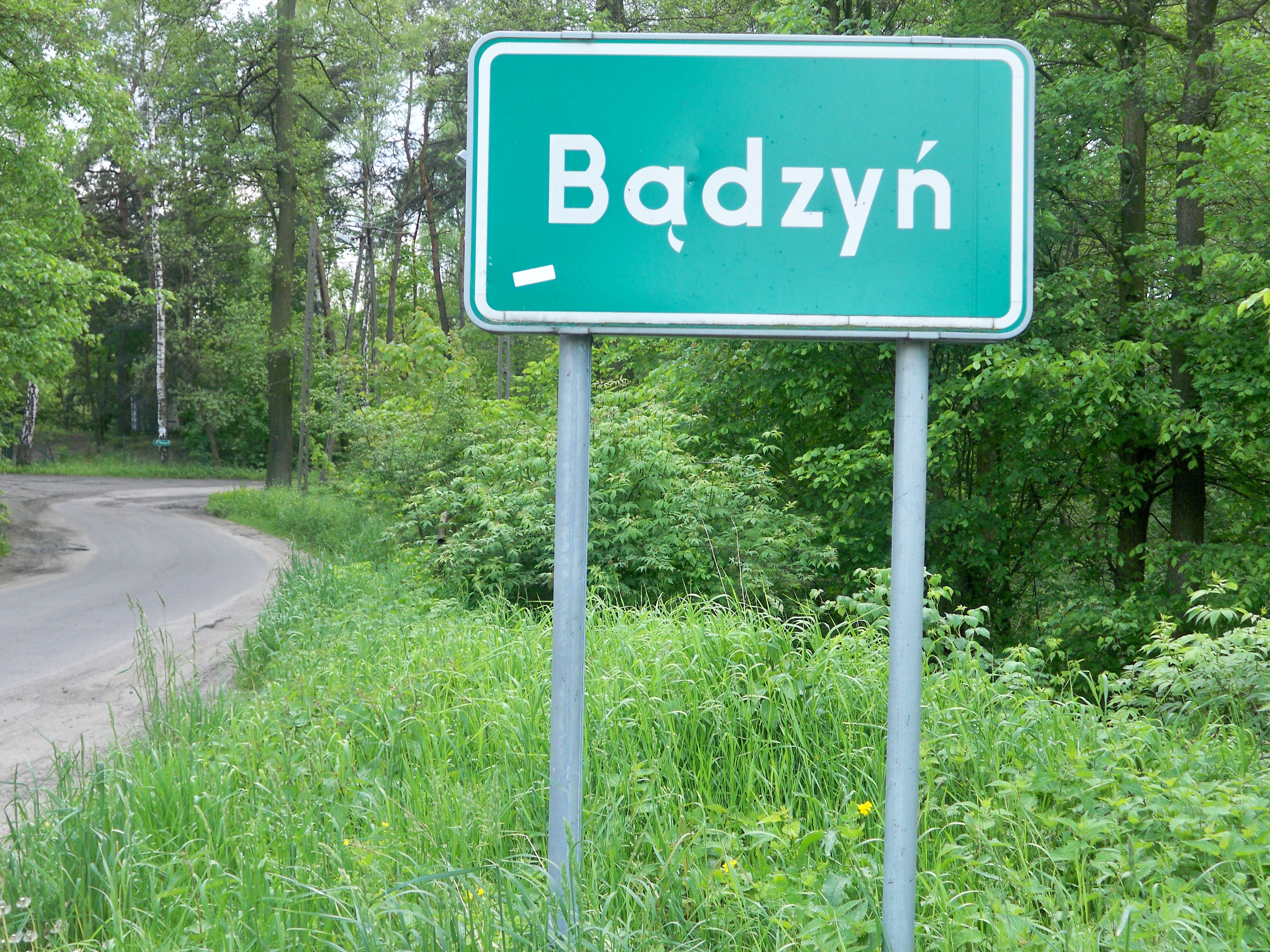

- Location within Poland
- Coordinates: 51°35′41″N 19°28′57″E
- Country: Poland
- Voivodeship: Łódź
- County: Łódź East
- Gmina: Tuszyn

Bądzyń [ˈbɔnd͡zɨɲ] is a village in the administrative district of Gmina Tuszyn, within Łódź East County, Łódź Voivodeship, in central Poland.
