= Strazha =

Strazha may refer to:

- Strazha, Smolyan Province, a village in Smolyan municipality, Smolyan Province
- Strazha, Targovishte Province, a village in Targovishte municipality, Targovishte Province

== See also ==
- Straža (disambiguation)
- Straja (disambiguation)
