= Garbów, Łódź East County =

Garbów
- Village
- Location within Poland
- Coordinates: 51°34′N 19°33′E
- Country: Poland
- Voivodeship: Łódź
- County: Łódź East
- Gmina: Tuszyn

Garbów [ˈɡarbuf] is a village in the administrative district of Gmina Tuszyn, within Łódź East County, Łódź Voivodeship, in central Poland.
