= Janówka, Łódź East County =

Janówka
- Village
- Location within Poland
- Coordinates: 51°44′13″N 19°41′6″E
- Country: Poland
- Voivodeship: Łódź
- County: Łódź East
- Gmina: Andrespol
- Population: 665

Janówka [jaˈnufka] is a village in the administrative district of Gmina Andrespol, within Łódź East County, Łódź Voivodeship, in central Poland.
