= Stróża =

Stróża may refer to:

- Stróża, Wołów County in Lower Silesian Voivodeship (south-west Poland)
- Stróża, Wrocław County in Lower Silesian Voivodeship (south-west Poland)
- Stróża, Lublin Voivodeship (east Poland)
- Stróża, Łódź East County in Łódź Voivodeship (central Poland)
- Stróża, Pajęczno County in Łódź Voivodeship (central Poland)
- Stróża, Limanowa County in Lesser Poland Voivodeship (south Poland)
- Stróża, Myślenice County in Lesser Poland Voivodeship (south Poland)
- Stróża, Świętokrzyskie Voivodeship (south-central Poland)
