= Mąkoszyn, Łódź Voivodeship =

Mąkoszyn
- Village
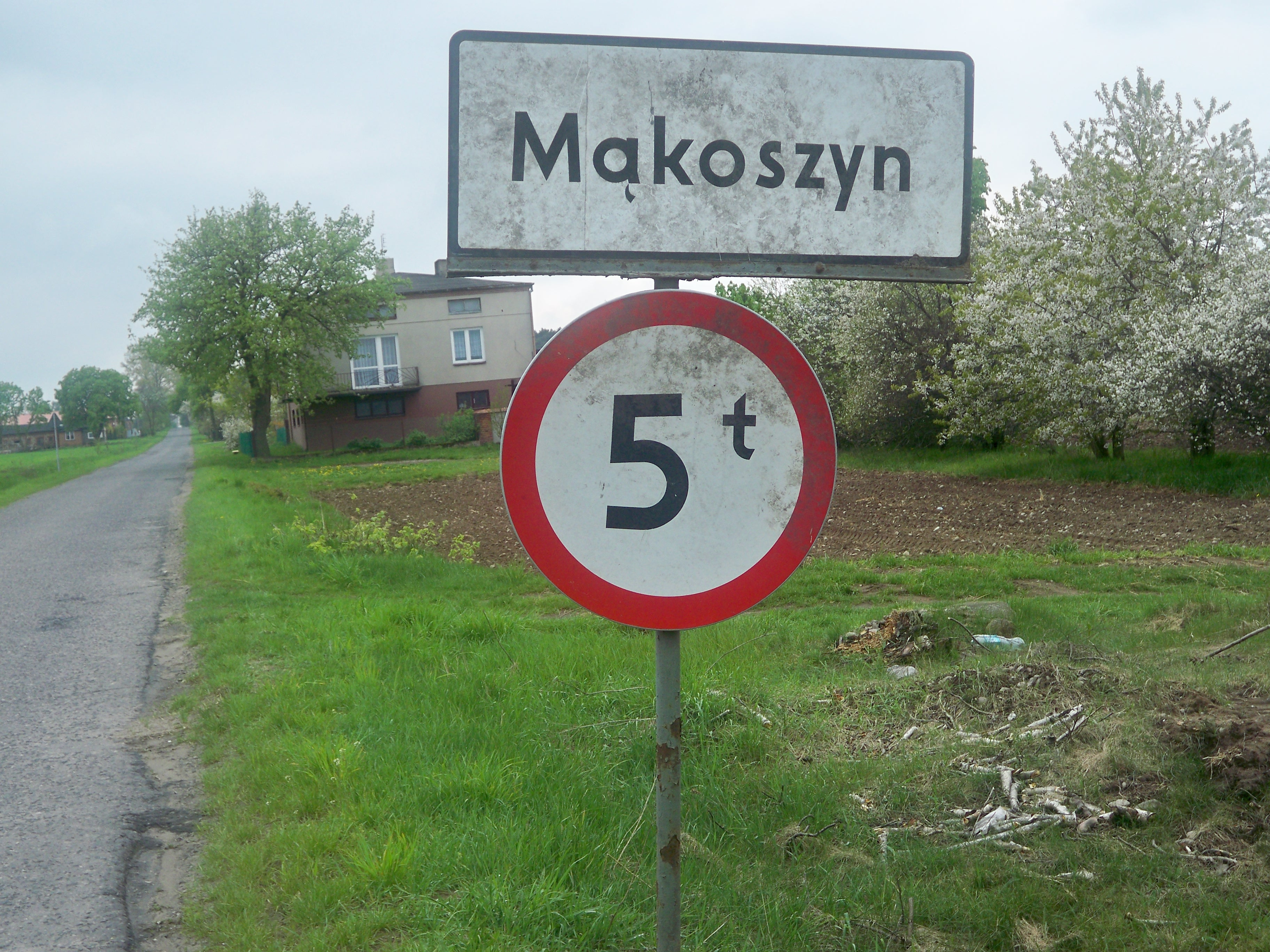

- Location within Poland
- Coordinates: 51°31′16″N 19°34′42″E
- Country: Poland
- Voivodeship: Łódź
- County: Łódź East
- Gmina: Tuszyn

Mąkoszyn [mɔŋˈkɔʂɨn] is a village in the administrative district of Gmina Tuszyn, within Łódź East County, Łódź Voivodeship, in central Poland.
