= Gmina Andrespol =

Gmina Andrespol Andrespol Commune
- Gmina

- Flag Coat of arms
- Interactive map of Gmina Andrespol
- Coordinates (Andrespol): 51°43′28″N 19°38′16″E
- Country: Poland
- Voivodeship: Łódź
- County: Łódź East County
- Seat: Andrespol

Area
  - Total: 23.77 km^{2} (9.18 sq mi)

Population (2010)
  - Total: 12,151
  - Density: 511.2/km^{2} (1,324/sq mi)
- Website: www.andrespol.pl

Gmina Andrespol is a rural gmina (administrative district) in Łódź East County, Łódź Voivodeship, in central Poland. Its seat is the village of Andrespol, which lies approximately 14 kilometres (9 mi) south-east of the regional capital Łódź.

The gmina covers an area of 23.77 square kilometres (9.2 sq mi), and as of 2010 its total population is 12,151

== Villages ==
Gmina Andrespol contains the villages and settlements of:

- Andrespol
- Bedoń Przykościelny
- Bedoń-Wieś
- Janówka
- Justynów
- Kraszew
- Nowy Bedoń
- Stróża
- Wiśniowa Góra
- Zielona Góra

== Neighbouring gminas ==
Gmina Andrespol is bordered by the city of Łódź and by the gminas of Brójce, Brzeziny, Koluszki and Nowosolna.
