= Zielona Góra, Łódź Voivodeship =

Zielona Góra
- Village
- Location within Poland
- Coordinates: 51°42′N 19°42′E
- Country: Poland
- Voivodeship: Łódź
- County: Łódź East
- Gmina: Andrespol

Zielona Góra (Polish: [ʑɛˈlɔna ˈɡura]) is a village in the administrative district of Gmina Andrespol, within Łódź East County, Łódź Voivodeship, in central Poland.
