= Górki Duże, Łódź Voivodeship =

Górki Duże
- Village
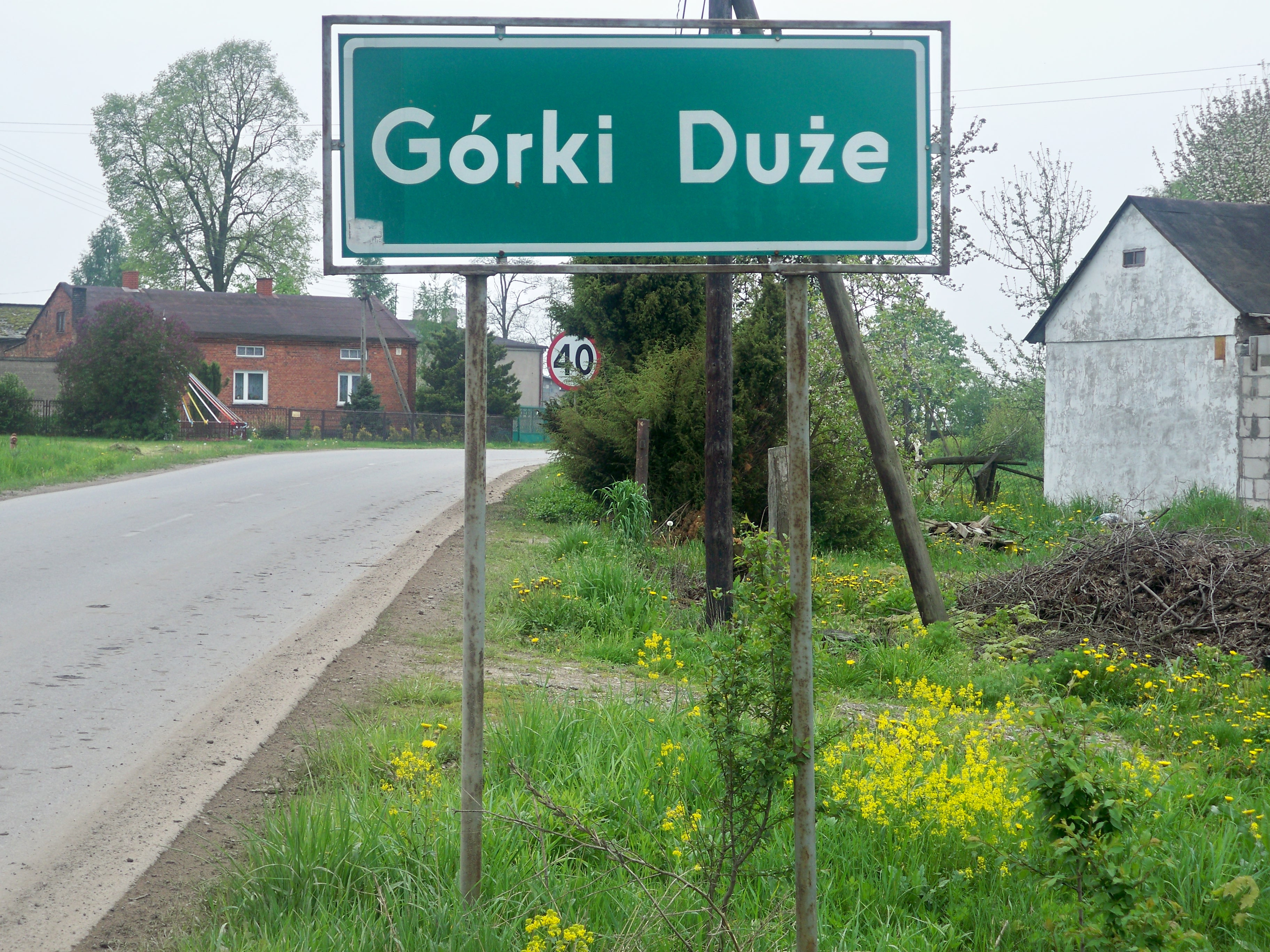
- Road sign in Górki Duże

- Location within Poland
- Coordinates: 51°33′47″N 19°31′09″E
- Country: Poland
- Voivodeship: Łódź
- County: Łódź East
- Gmina: Tuszyn

Górki Duże [ˈɡurki ˈduʐɛ] is a village in the administrative district of Gmina Tuszyn, within Łódź East County, Łódź Voivodeship, in central Poland.
