= Gmina Tuszyn =

Gmina Tuszyn Tuszyn Commune
- Gmina

- Coat of arms
- Interactive map of Gmina Tuszyn
- Coordinates (Tuszyn): 51°36′33″N 19°31′48″E
- Country: Poland
- Voivodeship: Łódź
- County: Łódź East County
- Seat: Tuszyn

Area
  - Total: 128.87 km^{2} (49.76 sq mi)

Population (2006)
  - Total: 11,690
  - Density: 90.71/km^{2} (234.9/sq mi)
  - Urban: 7,178
  - Rural: 4,512
- Website: www.tuszyn.info.pl

Gmina Tuszyn is an urban-rural gmina (administrative district) in Łódź East County, Łódź Voivodeship, in central Poland. Its seat is the town of Tuszyn, which lies approximately 20 kilometres (12 mi) south of the regional capital Łódź.

The gmina covers an area of 128.87 square kilometres (49.8 sq mi), and as of 2006 its total population is 11,690 (out of which the population of Tuszyn amounts to 7,178, and the population of the rural part of the gmina is 4,512).

== Villages ==
Apart from the town of Tuszyn, Gmina Tuszyn contains the villages and settlements of:

- Bądzyń
- Dylew
- Garbów
- Garbówek
- Głuchów
- Gołygów
- Górki Duże
- Górki Małe
- Jutroszew
- Kruszów
- Mąkoszyn
- Modlica
- Rydzynki
- Syski
- Szczukwin
- Tuszynek Majoracki
- Wodzin Majoracki
- Wodzin Prywatny
- Wodzinek
- Wola Kazubowa
- Żeromin
- Zofiówka

== Neighbouring gminas ==
Gmina Tuszyn is bordered by the gminas of Brójce, Czarnocin, Dłutów, Grabica, Moszczenica, Pabianice and Rzgów.

== Twin towns ==
- Bucha, Ukraine
