= Straža, Lipkovo =

Straža Стража Strazhë
- Village
- Location within North Macedonia
- Coordinates: 42°15′N 21°36′E
- Country: North Macedonia
- Region: Southeastern
- Municipality: Lipkovo

Population (2002)
  - Total: 0
- Time zone: UTC+1 (CET)
  - Summer (DST): UTC+2 (CEST)
- Car plates: KU
- Website: .

Straža (Macedonian: Стража, Albanian: Strazhë) is an abandoned village in the municipality of Lipkovo, North Macedonia.

== Demographics ==
The 1971 Yugoslav census was the last to record any people as residing in the village which contained 89 inhabitants, all Albanians. According to the 2002 census, the village had 0 inhabitants.
