= Straža pri Krškem =

Straža pri Krškem Straža Svetega Lovrenca (until 1955)
- Location in Slovenia
- Coordinates: 45°58′38.15″N 15°26′37.73″E
- Country: Slovenia
- Traditional region: Lower Carniola
- Statistical region: Lower Sava
- Municipality: Krško

Area
  - Total: 0.58 km^{2} (0.22 sq mi)
- Elevation: 387.5 m (1,271 ft)

Population (2002)
  - Total: 30
- Postal code: 8270

Straža pri Krškem (pronounced [ˈstɾaːʒa pɾi ˈkəɾʃkɛm]; German: Straža bei Sankt Lorenz) is a small village in the hills above the left bank of the Sava River northwest of the town of Krško in eastern Slovenia. The area is part of the traditional region of Lower Carniola. It is now included with the rest of the municipality in the Lower Sava Statistical Region.

== Name ==
The name of the settlement was changed from Straža Svetega Lovrenca (literally, 'Straža of St. Lawrence') to Straža pri Krškem (literally, 'Straža near Krško') in 1955. The name was changed on the basis of the 1948 Law on Names of Settlements and Designations of Squares, Streets, and Buildings as part of efforts by Slovenia's postwar communist government to remove religious elements from toponyms. In the past the German name was Straža bei Sankt Lorenz.

== History ==
During the Second World War, the Slovene population of the village was evicted and Gottschee Germans were settled in their place. The village was joined together with neighboring Dunaj, and the two villages were jointly renamed Lorenzberg.
