= Straža pri Raki =

Straža pri Raki Straža Svetega Valentina (until 1955)
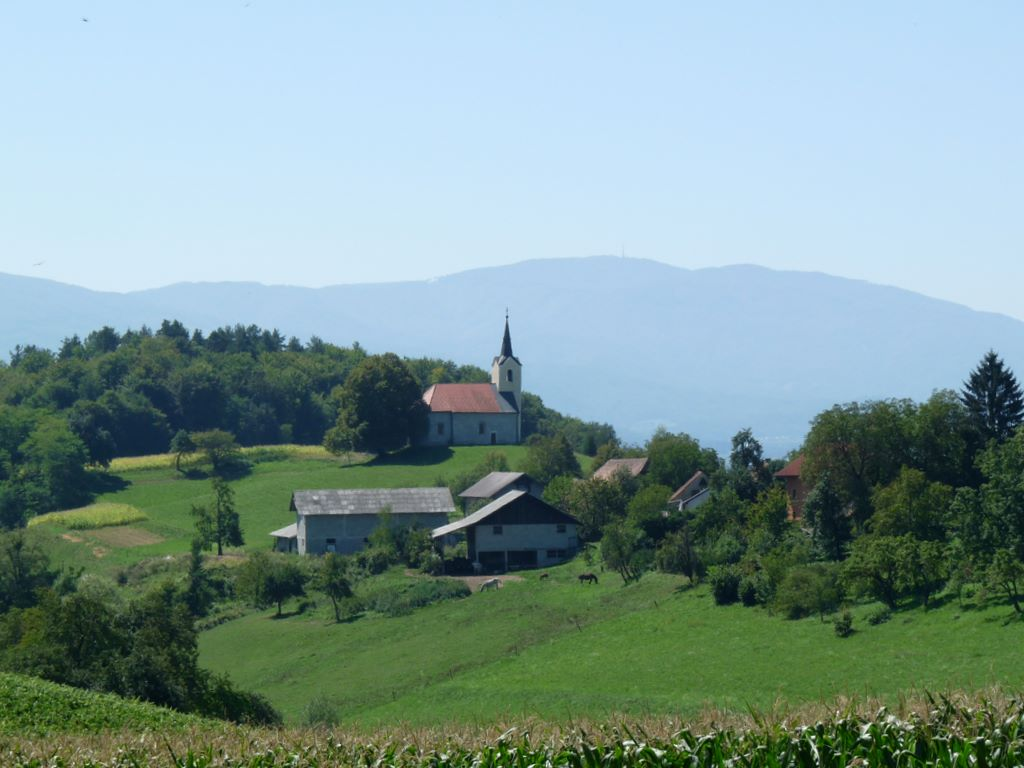

- Location in Slovenia
- Coordinates: 45°55′32.37″N 15°24′42.06″E
- Country: Slovenia
- Traditional region: Lower Carniola
- Statistical region: Lower Sava
- Municipality: Krško

Area
  - Total: 1.37 km^{2} (0.53 sq mi)
- Elevation: 210.5 m (691 ft)

Population (2002)
  - Total: 168
- Postal code: 8274

Straža pri Raki (pronounced [ˈstɾaːʒa pɾi ˈɾaːki]; in older sources also Straza pri Svetem Valentinu, German: Straža bei Sankt Valentin) is a settlement east of Raka in the Municipality of Krško in eastern Slovenia. The area is part of the traditional region of Lower Carniola. It is now included with the rest of the municipality in the Lower Sava Statistical Region.

== Name ==
The name of the settlement was changed from Straža Svetega Valentina (literally, 'Straža of St. Valentine') to Straža pri Raki (literally, 'Straža near Raka') in 1955. The name was changed on the basis of the 1948 Law on Names of Settlements and Designations of Squares, Streets, and Buildings as part of efforts by Slovenia's postwar communist government to remove religious elements from toponyms. In the past the German name was Straža bei Sankt Valentin.

== Church ==
The local church is dedicated to Saint Valentine and belongs to the Parish of Leskovec pri Krškem. It dates to the 17th century.
