= Tuszyn =

Town in Łódź Voivodeship, Poland

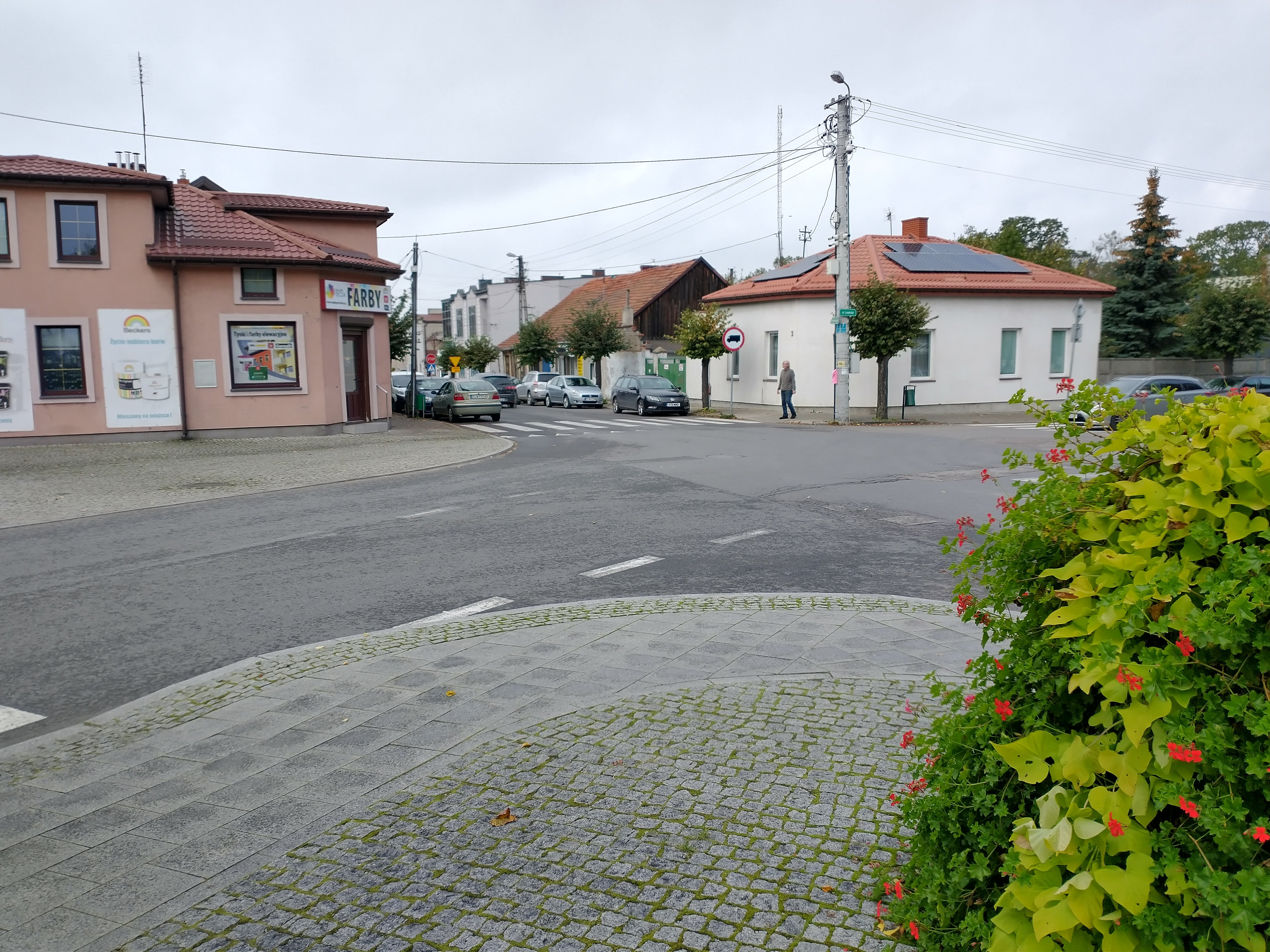
- Part of the Market Square and surrounding streets

- Coat of arms

- Location within Poland
- Coordinates: 51°36′33″N 19°31′48″E
- Country: Poland
- Voivodeship: Łódź
- County: Łódź East
- Gmina: Tuszyn

Government
  - Mayor: Witold Małecki

Area
  - Total: 23.25 km^{2} (8.98 sq mi)

Population (31 December 2020)
  - Total: 7,237 ▼
  - Density: 311.3/km^{2} (806.2/sq mi)
- Time zone: UTC+1 (CET)
  - Summer (DST): UTC+2 (CEST)
- Postal code: 95-080
- Vehicle registration: ELW
- Website: http://www.tuszyn.info.pl

Tuszyn [ˈtuʂɨn] is a small town in Łódź East County, Łódź Voivodeship, central Poland, with 7,237 inhabitants (2020). It is located in the Sieradz Land.

== History ==
Saints Vitalis church

In 1260, Duke Casimir I of Kuyavia stayed in the town and confirmed a privilege for the Sulejów Abbey. Tuszyn was royal town of the Kingdom of Poland, administratively located in the Piotrków County in the Sieradz Voivodeship in the Greater Poland Province.

Following the German-Soviet invasion of Poland, which started World War II in September 1939, the village was occupied by Germany until 1945. Several Poles, who were either born or lived and worked in Tuszyn, including the former chief of the local police, were murdered by the Russians in the Katyn massacre in 1940.

=== Jewish population ===
Jews initially settled in Tuszyn at the request of the local government to help develop the town after its destruction during the Swedish invasion in 1655. By 1781, 86 Jews lived in Tuszyn and by 1883 the population of Jews was 1,248. The Jewish population constituted 36% of the total population by 1897.

Following the invasion of Poland by Nazi Germany, Tuszyn was declared "judenfrei" following mass expulsions in early 1941.

The Jewish cemetery is about 2 hectares in extent. The cemetery was destroyed during WWII and subsequently continued to deteriorate. Today, 40-50 gravestones still exist on site. In 2019, there was a clean-up in which local students participated as part of the cemetery restoration. In 2021, a memorial was installed at the cemetery with a ceremony hosted by local and national groups and descendants from the U.S.

== Demographics ==
Historical population

Year	Pop.	±%
1827	1,230	—
1857	1,835	+49.2%
1921	3,451	+88.1%

Year	Pop.	±%
1931	4,202	+21.8%
2010	7,118	+69.4%
2020	7,237	+1.7%

== Climate ==
Tuszyn has a humid continental climate (Cfb in the Köppen climate classification).

Climate data for Tuszyn
Month	Jan	Feb	Mar	Apr	May	Jun	Jul	Aug	Sep	Oct	Nov	Dec	Year
Mean daily maximum °C (°F)	0.3 (32.5)	2.1 (35.8)	6.9 (44.4)	13.5 (56.3)	18.4 (65.1)	21.7 (71.1)	23.6 (74.5)	23.5 (74.3)	18.6 (65.5)	12.7 (54.9)	7.2 (45.0)	2.4 (36.3)	12.6 (54.6)
Daily mean °C (°F)	−1.9 (28.6)	−0.7 (30.7)	3.0 (37.4)	9.0 (48.2)	14.1 (57.4)	17.5 (63.5)	19.5 (67.1)	19.2 (66.6)	14.5 (58.1)	9.3 (48.7)	4.7 (40.5)	0.4 (32.7)	9.1 (48.3)
Mean daily minimum °C (°F)	−4.3 (24.3)	−3.7 (25.3)	−0.9 (30.4)	4.0 (39.2)	9.1 (48.4)	12.6 (54.7)	15.0 (59.0)	14.6 (58.3)	10.5 (50.9)	6.2 (43.2)	2.3 (36.1)	−1.7 (28.9)	5.3 (41.6)
Average precipitation mm (inches)	48 (1.9)	43 (1.7)	52 (2.0)	51 (2.0)	73 (2.9)	73 (2.9)	96 (3.8)	65 (2.6)	63 (2.5)	49 (1.9)	48 (1.9)	50 (2.0)	711 (28.1)
Source: https://en.climate-data.org/europe/poland/łodz-voivodeship/tuszyn-10374/
