= Łódź East County =

Łódź East County Powiat łódzki wschodni
- County
- Flag Coat of arms

- Location within the voivodeship

- Division into gminas
- Coordinates (Łódź): 51°47′N 19°28′E
- Country: Poland
- Voivodeship: Łódź
- Seat: Łódź
- Gminas: Total 6: Gmina Andrespol; Gmina Brójce; Gmina Koluszki; Gmina Nowosolna; Gmina Rzgów; Gmina Tuszyn

Area
  - Total: 499.32 km^{2} (192.79 sq mi)

Population (2006)
  - Total: 64,574
  - Density: 129.32/km^{2} (334.95/sq mi)
  - Urban: 23,923
  - Rural: 40,651
- Car plates: ELW
- Website: lodzkiwschodni.pl

Łódź East County (Polish: powiat łódzki wschodni) is a unit of territorial administration and local government (powiat) in Łódź Voivodeship, central Poland. It came into being on 1 January 1999 as a result of the Polish local government reforms passed in 1998. Its administrative seat is the city of Łódź, although the city is not part of the county (it constitutes a separate city county). The county consists of areas to the east and south of the city, and contains three towns: Koluszki, which lies 24 km (15 mi) east of Łódź, Tuszyn, 20 km (12 mi) south of Łódź, and Rzgów, 14 km (9 mi) south of Łódź.

The county covers an area of 499.32 square kilometres (192.8 sq mi). As of 2006 its total population is 64,574, out of which the population of Koluszki is 13,407, that of Tuszyn is 7,178, that of Rzgów is 3,338, and the rural population is 40,651.

Until 2002 the county also included the areas which now form Brzeziny County.

== Neighbouring counties ==
Apart from the city of Łódź, Łódź East County is also bordered by Zgierz County to the north, Brzeziny County to the north-east, Tomaszów County to the south-east, Piotrków County to the south and Pabianice County to the west.

== Administrative divisions ==
The county is subdivided into six gminas (three urban-rural and three rural). These are listed in the following table, in descending order of population.

Gmina	Type	Area (km^{2})	Population (2006)	Seat
Gmina Koluszki	urban-rural	157.2	22,985	Koluszki
Gmina Andrespol	rural	23.8	11,693	Andrespol
Gmina Tuszyn	urban-rural	128.9	11,690	Tuszyn
Gmina Rzgów	urban-rural	66.0	9,019	Rzgów
Gmina Brójce	rural	69.6	5,399	Brójce
Gmina Nowosolna	rural	54.0	3,788	Nowosolna
