= Zipser Willkür =

German town law of the Zipser Germans

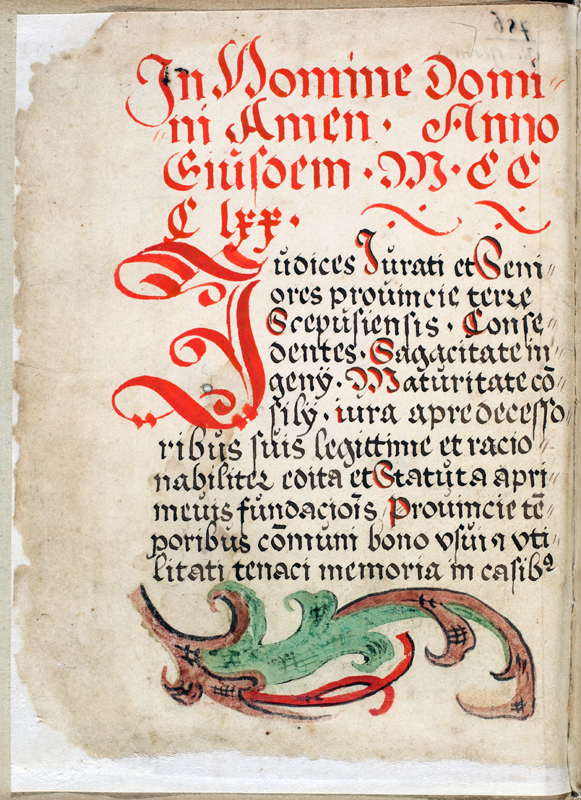
The first page from the medieval manuscript of Zipser Willkür

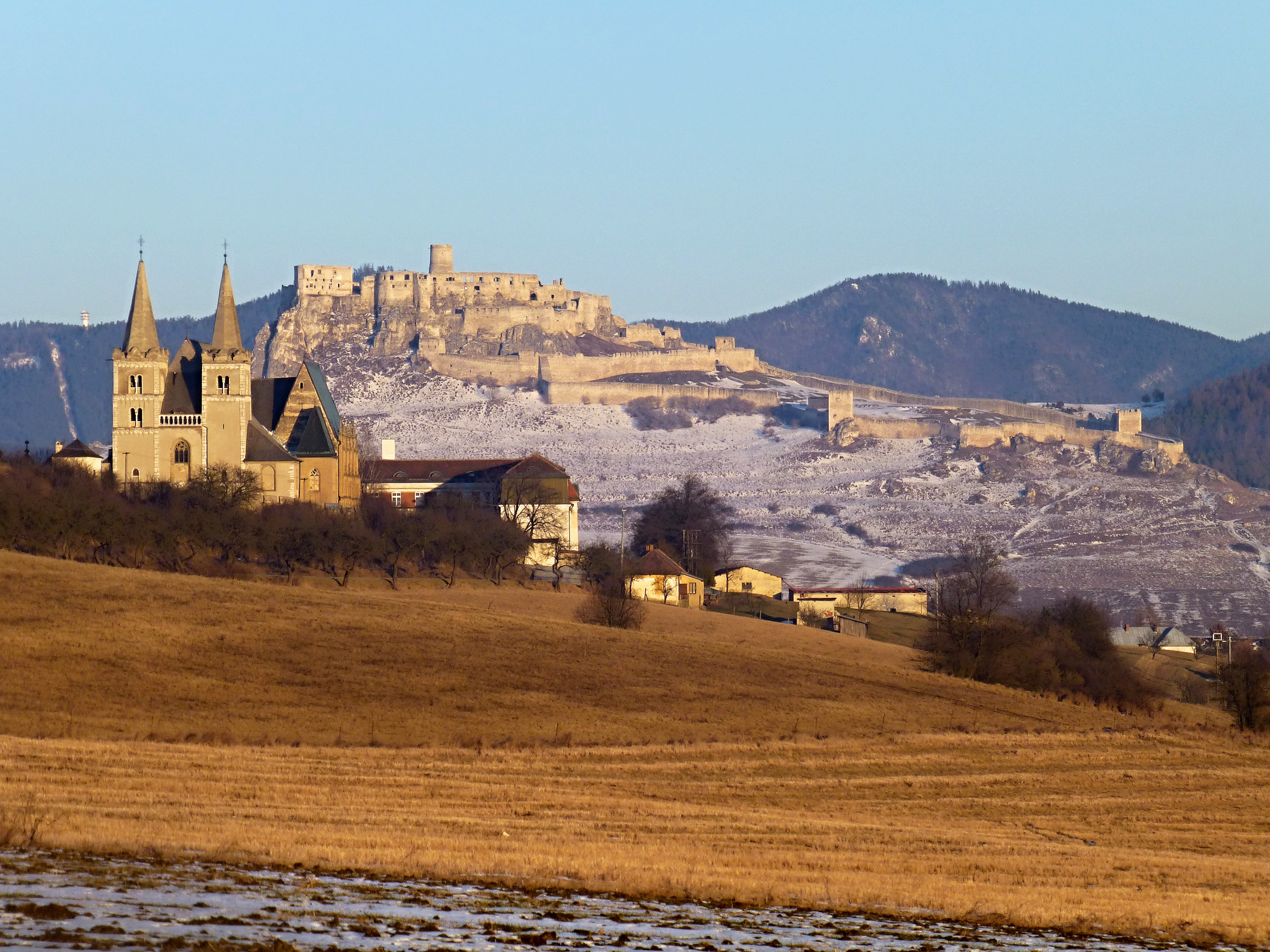
Spišská Kapitula (German: Zipser Kapitel), a notable example of Zipser German settlement in Spiš (German: Zips), Slovakia, and Spiš Castle (German: Zipser Burg) nearby, as seen in winter time.

Zipser Willkür (i.e. Zipser arbitrariness), alternatively known as Zipser Recht (i.e. Zipser Law) as well, was the official German town law (German: Deutsches Stadtrecht) of the Zipser Germans or Zipser Saxons (German: Zipser, Zipser Deutsche or Zipser Sachsen), an ethnic German group which settled in the Szepes County, Kingdom of Hungary, now Spiš (German: Zips), northeastern Slovakia (as well as a small part in the Lesser Poland Voivodeship in southern Poland) starting in the Middle Ages. This particular law is the oldest German town law which was used in medieval Slovakia, thereby applying town privileges where it was in effect.

== Historical background ==
Levoča (German: Leutschau) was the capital of the Zipser Saxons and of Zips komitat in the Middle Ages.

The Zipser Willkür provided a certain degree of local autonomy granted by the Hungarian monarch to the urban settlements inhabited by the Zipser Germans in their komitat (i.e. county) in the former Kingdom of Hungary during the medieval period (and extended towards the constituent villages pertaining to the towns where the law held sway). The law was ratified by King Louis I of Hungary (also known as Ludwig the Great). The capital of the Zips komitat (or Szepes County) was Levoča (German: Leutschau). Its earliest text is preserved by a codex which also contains the Georgenberg Chronicle.

The Zipser Germans have been living on the current territory of Slovakia since the 12th century (then Upper Hungary), being part of or involved in, as other constituent groups of the German diaspora in Central and Eastern Europe (German: Mitteleuropa), the Ostsiedlung process (or the "German eastward settlement" of significant parts of Central Europe and Eastern Europe during the High Middle Ages). They are also related to another German community from Central-Eastern Europe with medieval roots, more specifically the Transylvanian Saxons (German: Siebenbürger Sachsen) in Transylvania (German: Siebenbürgen or Transsilvanien), central Romania.

== See also ==
- Province of 16 Szepes Towns
- Lokator
- List of towns with German town law
- Burgrecht
- Magdeburg rights
- Sachsenspiegel
- Transylvanian Saxon University
