= List of towns with German town law =

A list of towns in Europe with German town law (German: Deutsches Stadtrecht). The year of law granting is listed when known.

== Schleswig law ==
German: Schleswiger Recht)

- Schleswig

== Lübeck law ==
(Lübisches Recht)

- Klaipėda (Memel), 1258
- Braniewo (Braunsberg), 1254
- Elbląg (Elbing), 1237
- Gdańsk (Danzig), 1240
- Hamburg, ca. 1190
- Kołobrzeg (Kolberg), 1255
- Koszalin (Köslin), 1266
- Lübeck, 1143
- Rostock, 1218
- Słupsk (Stolp), 1265
- Stralsund, 1234
- Tallinn (Reval), 1248
- Rakvere (Wesenberg), 1302
- Narva (Narwa), 1345
- Haapsalu (Hapsal), 1585

== Riga law ==
(Rigaer Recht)

- Riga and several other Livonian towns

== Schwerin-Parchim law ==
(Schweriner und Parchimer Recht)

- Parchim, 1225
- Schwerin, 1160

== Stendal law ==
(Stendaler Recht)

- Stendal, ca. 1160

== Brandenburg law ==
(Brandenburger Recht)

- Berlin, 1225–32
- Brandenburg, 1170
- Frankfurt an der Oder, 1253
- Słupsk (Stolp), 1310
- Stargard Szczeciński (Stargard in Pommern), 1253
- Szczecin (Stettin), 1243
- Wałcz (Deutsch-Krone), 1303

== Kulm law ==
(Kulmer Recht)

- Klaipėda (Memel), 1475
- Biały Bór (Baldenburg), 1382
- Bytów (Bütow), 1346
- Chełmno (Kulm), 1233
- Ciechanów (Ciechanow), 1400
- Działdowo (Soldau), 1344
- Grudziądz (Graudenz), 1291
- Iława (Deutsch-Eylau), 1305
- Kaliningrad (Königsberg), 1286
- Kwidzyń (Marienwerder), 1233
- Olsztyn (Allenstein), 1348
- Płock (Plozk), 1237
- Rawa
- Różan (Rozan), 1378
- Toruń (Thorn), 1233
- Warsaw (Warschau), 1334

== Magdeburg law ==
(Magdeburger Recht)

- Bautzen, not later than 1213 (maybe 1157)
- Brest, Belarus, 1390
- Chemnitz, 1414
- Cottbus
- Dresden, 1299
- Halle an der Saale, ca. 1150
- Kapyl, 1652
- Leipzig, 1161-1170
- Magdeburg, 1188
- Prudnik (Neustadt in Oberschlesien), 1279

== Görlitz law ==
(Görlitzer Recht)

- Görlitz/Zgorzelec, 1303

== Lwówek Śląski law ==
(Löwenberger Recht)

- Cieszyn/Český Těšín (Teschen), 1374
- Lwówek Śląski (Löwenberg), before 1217
- Oświęcim (Auschwitz)
- Žilina (Sillein), 1357

== Cheb law ==
(Egerer Recht)

- Cheb (Eger), 1266

== Old Prague law ==
(Prag-Altstädter Recht)

- České Budějovice (Budweis), 1251
- Plzeň (Pilsen), 1298
- Prague (Prag), ca. 1230
- Příbram (Freiberg in Böhmen)

== Litoměřice law ==
(Leitmeritzer Recht)

- Kolín (Kolin), 1261
- Litoměřice (Leitmeritz), 1230

== Jihlava law ==
(Iglauer Recht)

- Havlíčkův Brod (Deutsch-Brod)
- Jihlava (Iglau), 1249
- Kremnica (Kremnitz), 1328
- Kutná Hora (Kuttenberg)
- Prague, Malá Strana, 1267
- Sebeş (Mühlbach)
- Sibiu (Hermannstadt), 1224

== Brno law ==
(Brünner Recht)

- Brno (Brünn), 1243
- Znojmo (Znaim), 1226

== Olomouc law ==
(Olmützer Recht)

- Olomouc (Olmütz), 1261
- Ostrava (Ostrau)
- Uničov (Mährisch-Neustadt), 1223

== Nysa law ==
(Neisser Recht)

- Nysa (Neiße)

== Głubczyce law ==
(Leobschützer Recht)

- Głubczyce (Leobschütz), 1200

== Środa Śląska law ==
(Neumarkter Recht)

Sroda Slaska law (Latin: ius Novi Fori, ius sredense, German: Neumarkt-Magdeburger Recht) was a legal constitution for a municipal form of government used in some Polish cities during the Middle Ages. It was based on town charter of Halle (Saale), a town located in German state of Saxony-Anhalt. Sroda Slaska law was popular in the 13th century in Lower Silesia, eastern Greater Poland and northern Lesser Poland. Altogether, some 100 towns were granted Sroda Slaska law, together with hundreds of villages. Introduction of this law was supported by Silesian Duke Henry I the Bearded, who frequently sent his envoys to Halle for consultation. Compared with Magdeburg rights, Sroda law as less advanced and more conservative, providing limited autonomy to towns. First town in the Kingdom of Poland which was granted Sroda Slaska law was Kostomloty (probably 1241), followed by Ujow and Sobotka.

Kalisz law (Latin: ius Calisiense) was a local variety of Sroda Slaska law, used in eastern Greater Poland and Wieluń Land. In 1283, Duke Przemysl II created high court of German law, located in Kalisz.

- Bardejov (Bartfeld), 1370
- Belz, 1377
- Bochnia (Salzberg), 1253
- Brest, 1390
- Brzeg (Brieg), 1248
- Chełm (Cholm), 1392
- Dubno, 1507
- Głogów (Glogau), 1253
- Gniezno (Gnesen), 1243
- Halych (Halicz)
- Hrodna (Grodno), 1391
- Hrubieszów (Hrubieszow), 1400
- Humenné (Homenau)
- Jarosław (Jaroslau), 1351
- Jasło (Jaslo), 1366
- Kalisz (Kalisch), 1282
- Kamianets-Podilskyi (Kamenez Podolsk), 1374
- Kaunas (Kauen), 1408
- Khmilnyk (Chmelnik), 1448
- Kielce, 1346
- Kiev (Kiew), 1494
- Kluczbork (Kreuzburg in Oberschlesien)
- Kolomyia (Kolomea), 1405
- Koprzywnica (Kopreinitz), 1268
- Kraków (Krakau), 1257
- Krupina (Karpfen), before 1241
- Łódź, 1423
- Lublin, 1317
- Lutsk (Luzk), 1432
- Lviv (Lemberg), 1356
- Minsk, 1496
- Navahrudak
- Nowy Sącz (Neu Sandez)
- Nowy Targ (Neumarkt), 1346
- Oleśnica (Oels), 1255
- Opava (Troppau), 1273
- Polatsk (Polozk)
- Poznań (Posen), 1253
- Przemyśl (Przemysl), 1353
- Radom, 1360
- Radomsko
- Rzeszów (Rzeszow), 1354
- Sambir (Sambor)
- Sandomierz (Sandomir), 1227
- Siedlce, 1549
- Sieradz (Schieratz)
- Słupca (Slupca), 1296
- Slutsk (Sluzk), 1441
- Środa Śląska (Neumarkt in Schlesien), 1211
- Tarnów, 1328
- Terebovlia (Trembowla), 1389
- Trakai (Troki)
- Ujazd (Ujest), 1223
- Vilnius (Wilna), 1387
- Vitsebsk (Witebsk), 1547
- Volodymyr-Volynskyi (Wladimir Wolynsk), before 1324
- Wrocław (Breslau), 1242
- Zgierz, 1224
- Zhytomyr (Schitomir), 1444
- Żmigród (Trachenberg), 1253

== South German law ==
(Süddeutsches Stadtrecht)

- Alba Iulia (Karlsburg)
- Amberg
- Bad Reichenhall
- Banská Bystrica (Neusohl), 1255
- Berehovo, 1342
- Bistriţa (Bistritz)
- Braşov (Kronstadt)
- Bratislava (Pressburg), 1291
- Bruck an der Mur
- Buda (Ofen), ca. 1350
- Celje (Cilli)
- Campulung (Langenau), ca. 1300
- Cluj-Napoca (Klausenburg)
- Dej (Desch)
- Eger (Erlau)
- Esztergom (Gran)
- Gorizia (Görz), 1307
- Graz, 1281
- Győr (Raab), 1271
- Kežmarok (Käsmark), 1269
- Khust (Hust)
- Kočevje (Gottschee)
- Komárom/Komárno (Komorn), 1265
- Košice (Kaschau), 1347
- Levoča (Leutschau), 1271
- Linz, 1241
- Maribor (Marburg an der Drau), 1254
- Munich (München), 1294
- Nitra (Neutra), 1248
- Nuremberg, 1200
- Oradea (Großwardein), 1408
- Passau, 1255
- Pécs (Fünfkirchen)
- Pest, 1244
- Piatra Neamț
- Prešov (Preschau), 1374
- Regensburg, 1207/1230
- Rimavská Sobota (Großsteffelsdorf)
- Salzburg, 1368
- Sankt Pölten, 1159
- Sárospatak
- Satu Mare (Sathmar), 1213
- Sighetu Marmaţiei (Marmarosch Sziget)
- Sighişoara (Schäßburg)
- Sopron (Ödenburg)
- Steyr, 1287
- Suceava (Sutschawa)
- Szeged (Szegedin)
- Székesfehérvár (Stuhlweißenburg), 1237
- Szentgotthárd (Sankt Gotthard)
- Szombathely (Steinamanger)
- Târgu Jiu
- Trnava (Tyrnau) 1238
- Varaždin (Warasdin)
- Vasvár (Eisenburg)
- Vienna (Wien), 1221/1237/1296
- Villach, 1239
- Vukovar
- Wiener Neustadt, 1277
- Zagreb (Agram), 1242
