= Town privileges =

Aspect of city law in medieval Europe

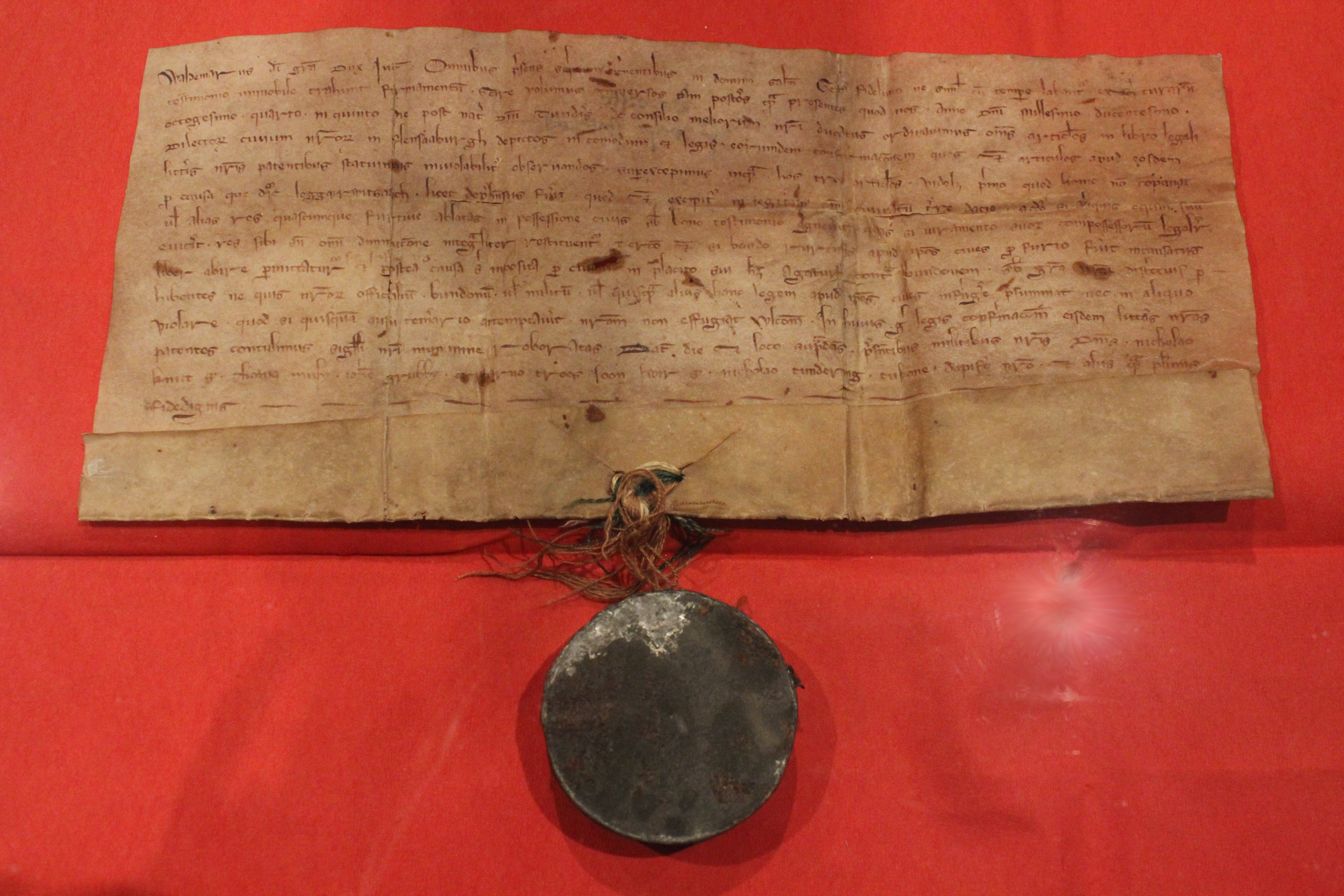
The borough charter of Flensburg (1284)

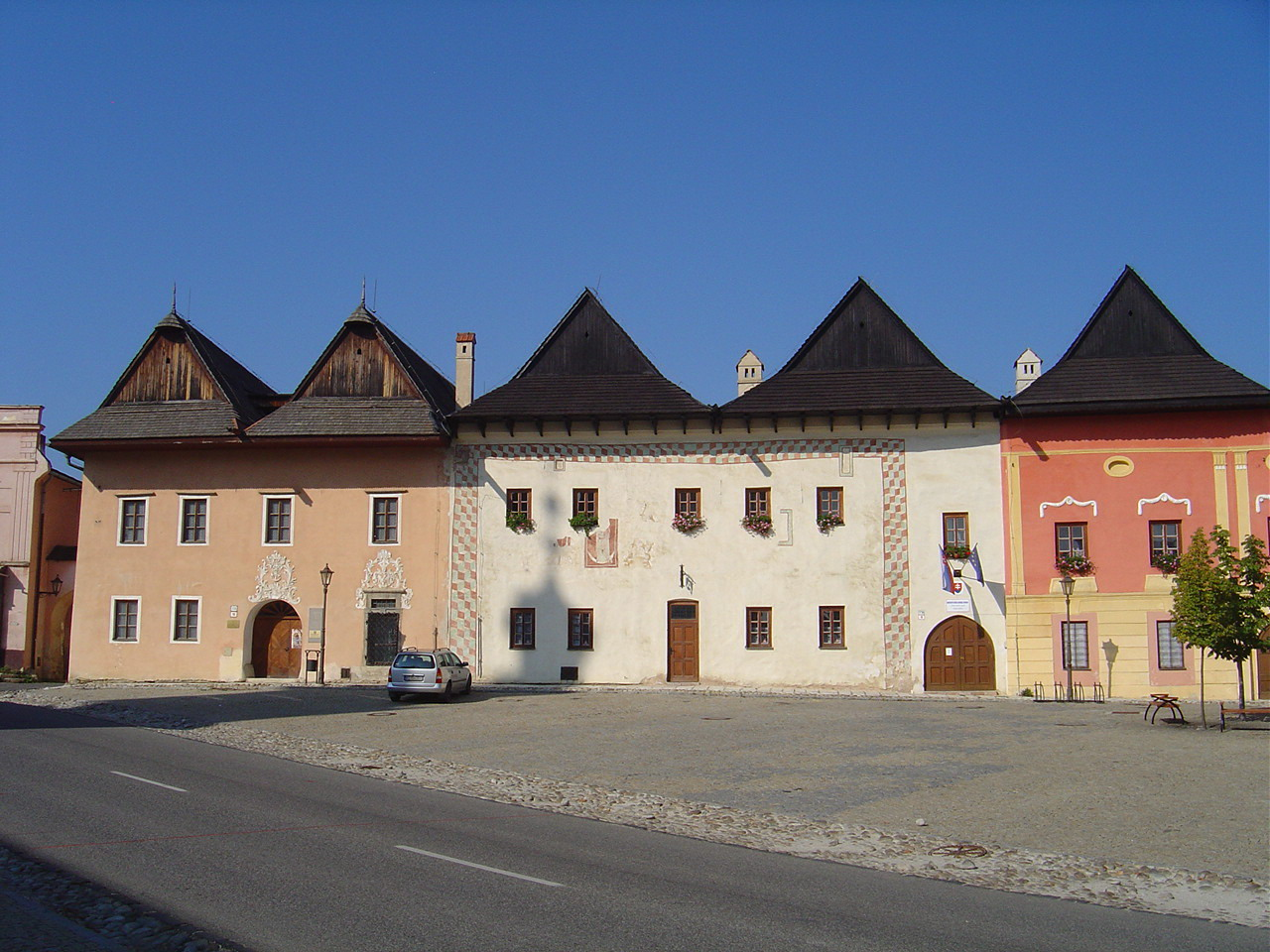
Medieval square in Spišská Sobota, Slovakia (now in Poprad). The former name of the town literally means "Saturday in Spiš" and it is derived from a day of week in which the town was granted a right to organize a market.

Town privileges or borough rights were important features of European towns during most of the second millennium. The city law customary in Central Europe probably dates back to Italian models, which in turn were oriented towards the traditions of the self-administration of Roman cities.

Judicially, a borough (or burgh) was distinguished from the countryside by means of a charter from the ruling monarch that defined its privileges and laws. Common privileges involved trade (marketplace, the storing of goods, etc.) and the establishment of guilds. Some of these privileges were permanent and could imply that the town obtained the right to be called a borough, hence the term "borough rights" (German: Stadtrecht; Dutch: stadsrechten). Some degree of self-government, representation by diet, and tax-relief could also be granted. Multiple tiers existed; for example, in Sweden, the basic royal charter establishing a borough enabled trade, but not foreign trade, which required a higher-tier charter granting staple right.

== See also ==
- City rights in the Low Countries
- City status in the United Kingdom
- Confoederatio cum principibus ecclesiasticis
- German town law
- Town law in Switzerland
- Zipser Willkür
- Imperial free city
- Kulm law
- Lübeck law
- Magdeburg rights
- Market town
- Royal free cities in the Kingdom of Hungary
- Scottish Burgh
- Town privileges in Norway
- Town privileges in Sweden
