= Borzygniew, Lower Silesian Voivodeship =

Borzygniew
- Village
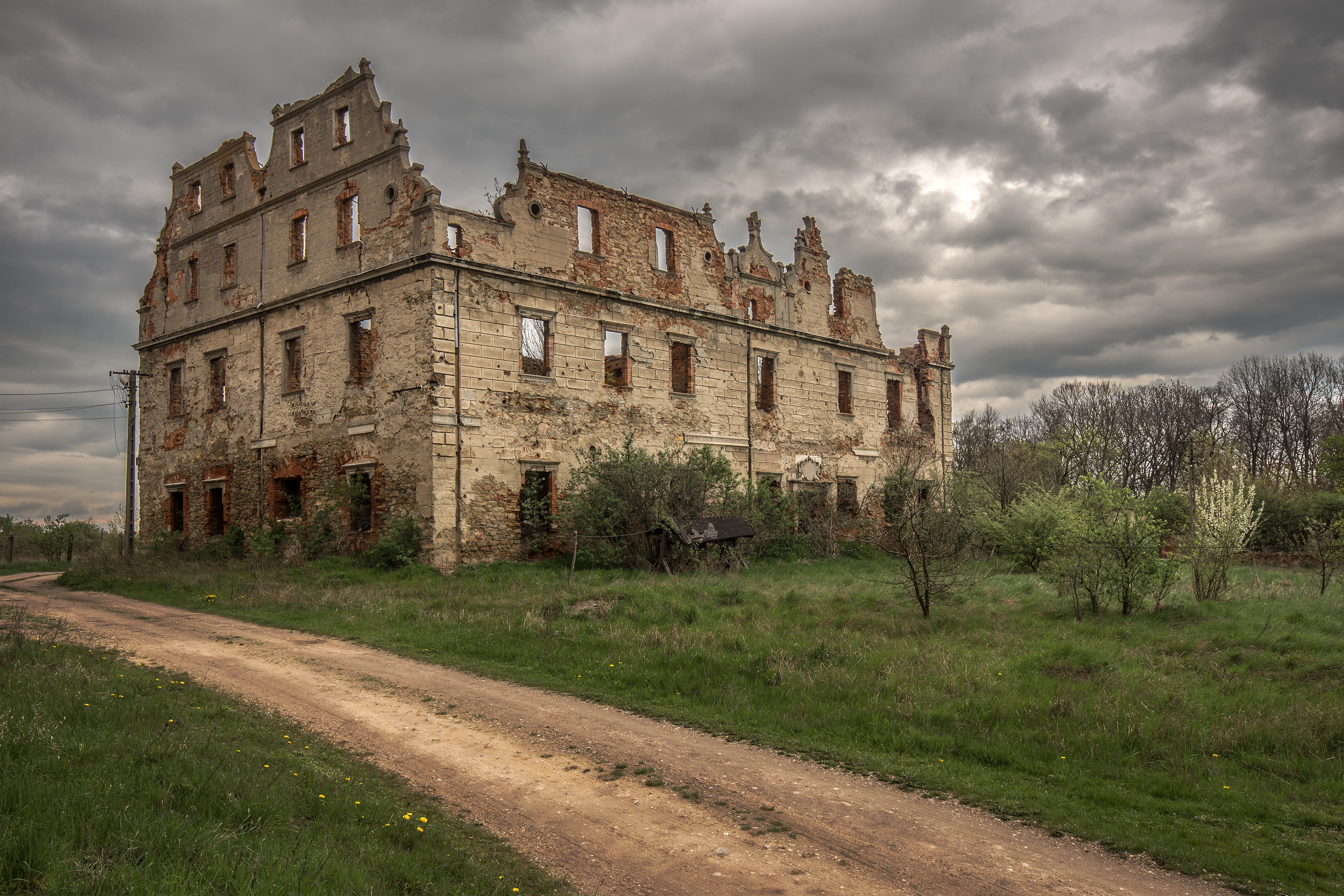
- Palace

- Location within Poland
- Coordinates: 50°58′22″N 16°37′39″E
- Country: Poland
- Voivodeship: Lower Silesian
- County: Wrocław
- Gmina: Mietków

Borzygniew [bɔˈʐɨɡɲɛf] (German: Bergen) is a village in the administrative district of Gmina Mietków, within Wrocław County, Lower Silesian Voivodeship, in south-western Poland.
