= Chwałów, Lower Silesian Voivodeship =

Chwałów
- Village
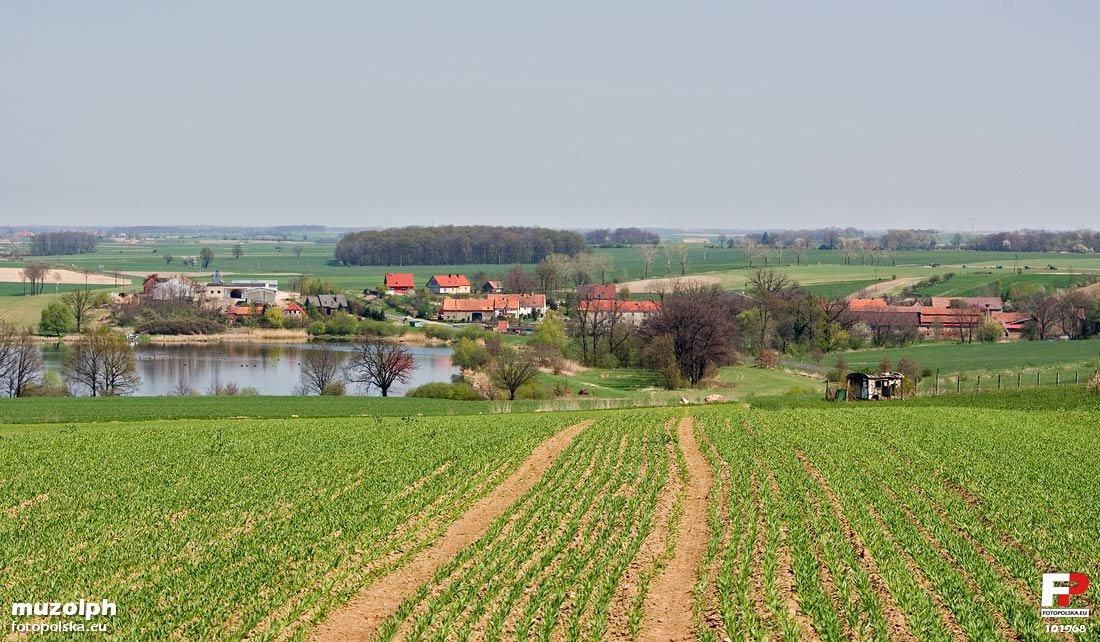

- Location within Poland
- Coordinates: 50°56′12″N 16°37′08″E
- Country: Poland
- Voivodeship: Lower Silesian
- County: Wrocław
- Gmina: Mietków

Chwałów [ˈxfawuf] is a village in the administrative district of Gmina Mietków, within Wrocław County, Lower Silesian Voivodeship, in south-western Poland.
