= Piława, Lower Silesian Voivodeship =

Piława
- Village
- Location within Poland
- Coordinates: 50°59′5″N 16°44′7″E
- Country: Poland
- Voivodeship: Lower Silesian
- County: Wrocław
- Gmina: Mietków
- Time zone: UTC+1 (CET)
  - Summer (DST): UTC+2 (CEST)
- Vehicle registration: DWR

Piława [piˈwava] is a village in the administrative district of Gmina Mietków, within Wrocław County, Lower Silesian Voivodeship, in south-western Poland.
