= Wawrzeńczyce, Lower Silesian Voivodeship =

Wawrzeńczyce
- Village
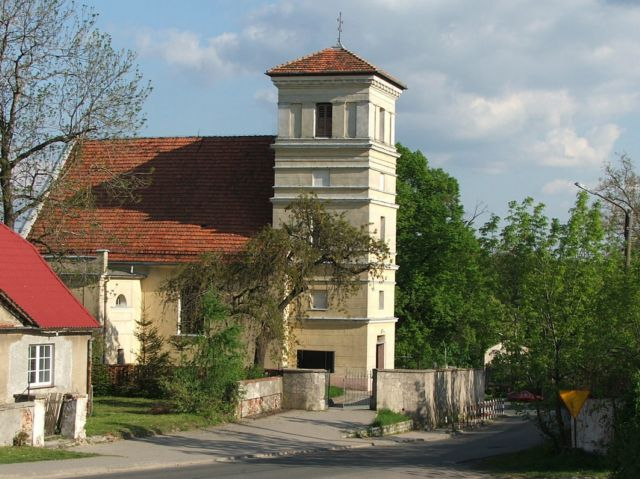
- Local Catholic church

- Location within Poland
- Coordinates: 50°59′39″N 16°38′52″E
- Country: Poland
- Voivodeship: Lower Silesian
- County: Wrocław
- Gmina: Mietków
- Population: 244
- Website: http://www.wawrzenczyce.com

Wawrzeńczyce [vavʐɛɲˈt͡ʂɨt͡sɛ] is a village in the administrative district of Gmina Mietków, within Wrocław County, Lower Silesian Voivodeship, in south-western Poland.
