= Maniów Mały =

- Village
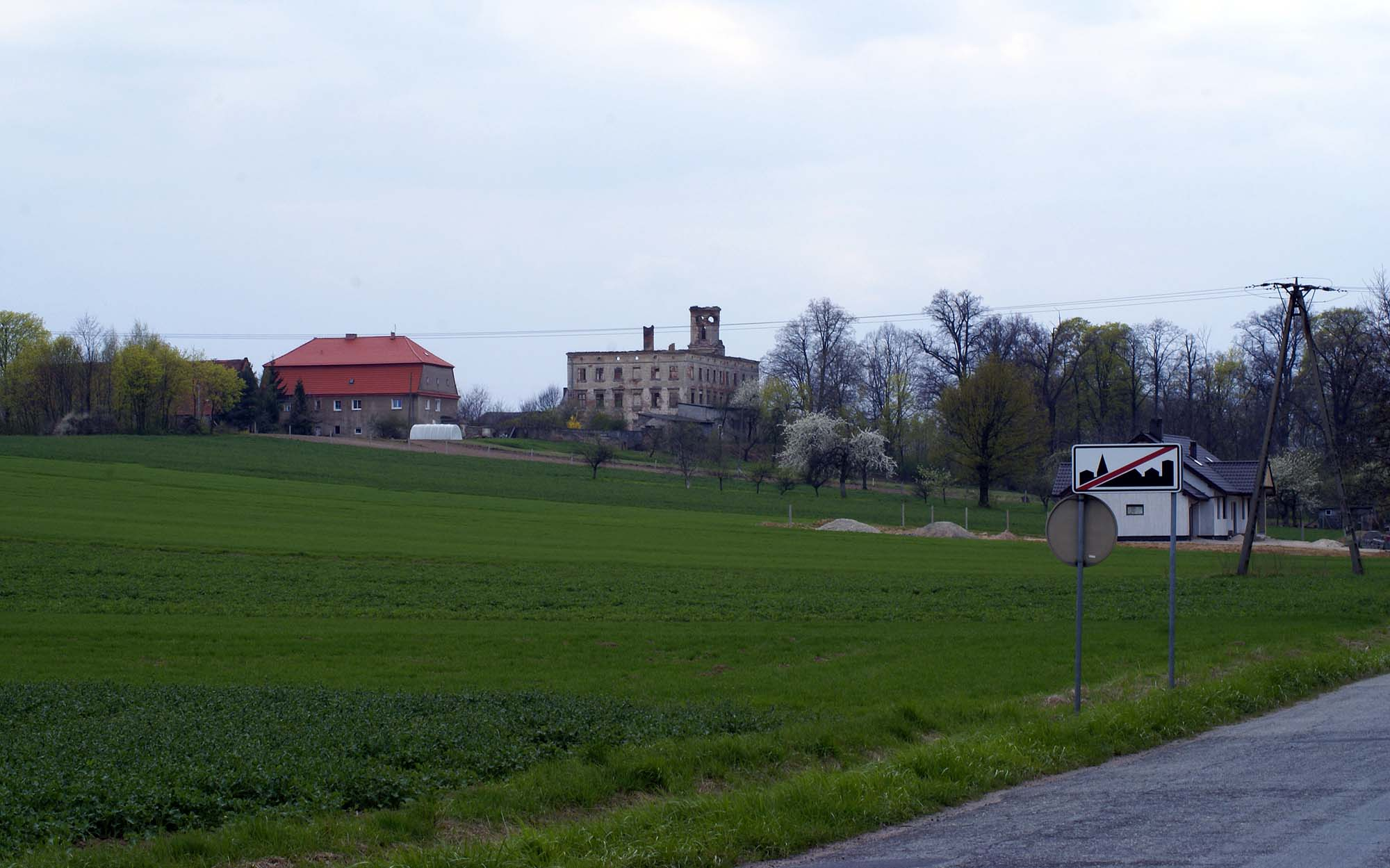

- Location within Poland
- Coordinates: 50°57′N 16°39′E
- Country: Poland
- Voivodeship: Lower Silesian
- County: Wrocław
- Gmina: Mietków

Maniów Mały [ˈmaɲuf ˈmawɨ] is a village in the administrative district of Gmina Mietków, within Wrocław County, Lower Silesian Voivodeship, in south-western Poland.
