= Maniów, Wrocław County =

Maniów
- Village
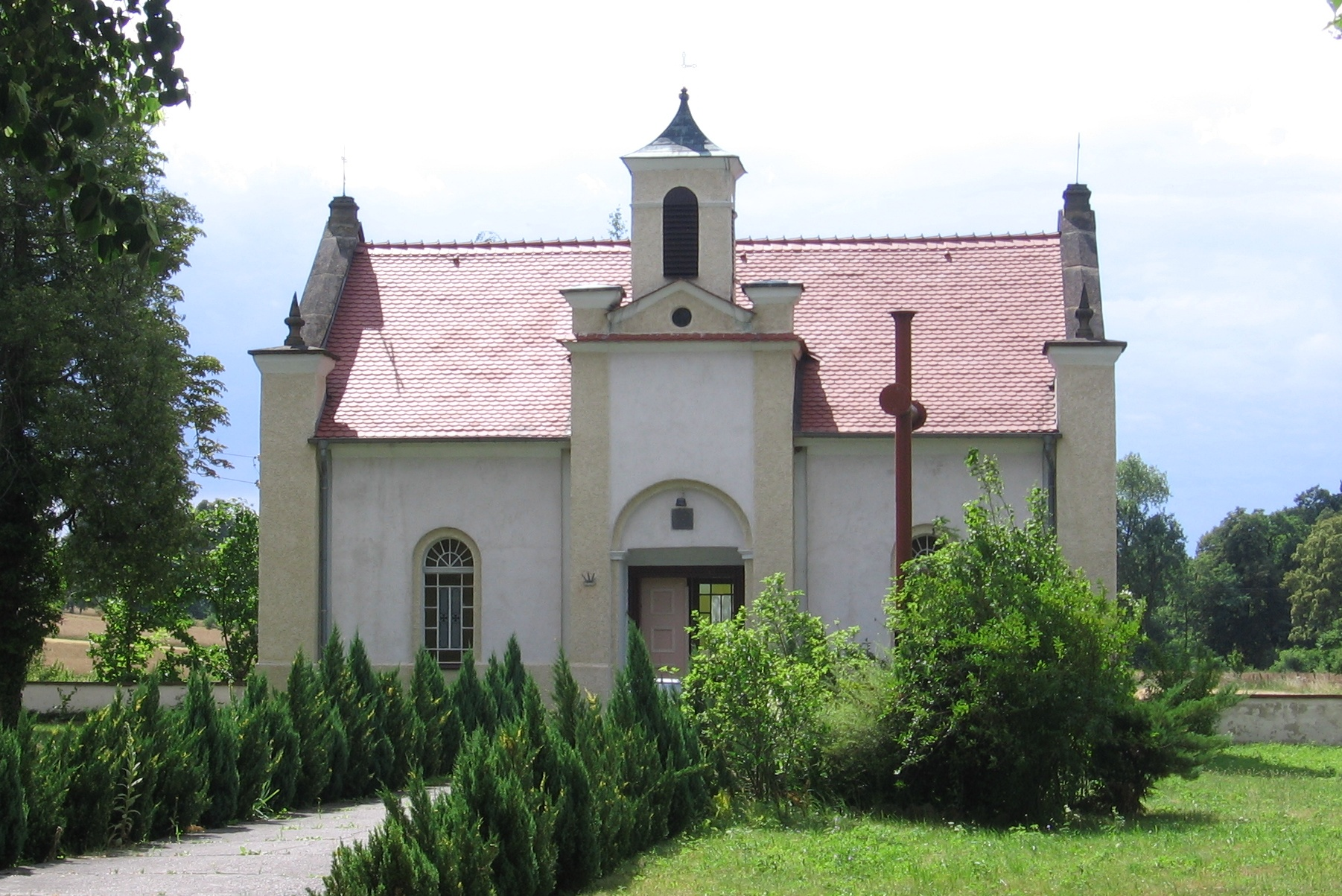
- Maniow-kaplica.cmentarna

- Location within Poland
- Coordinates: 50°57′9″N 16°39′53″E
- Country: Poland
- Voivodeship: Lower Silesian
- County: Wrocław
- Gmina: Mietków

Maniów [ˈmaɲuf] is a village in the administrative district of Gmina Mietków, within Wrocław County, Lower Silesian Voivodeship, in south-western Poland.
