= Milin, Lower Silesian Voivodeship =

Milin
- Village
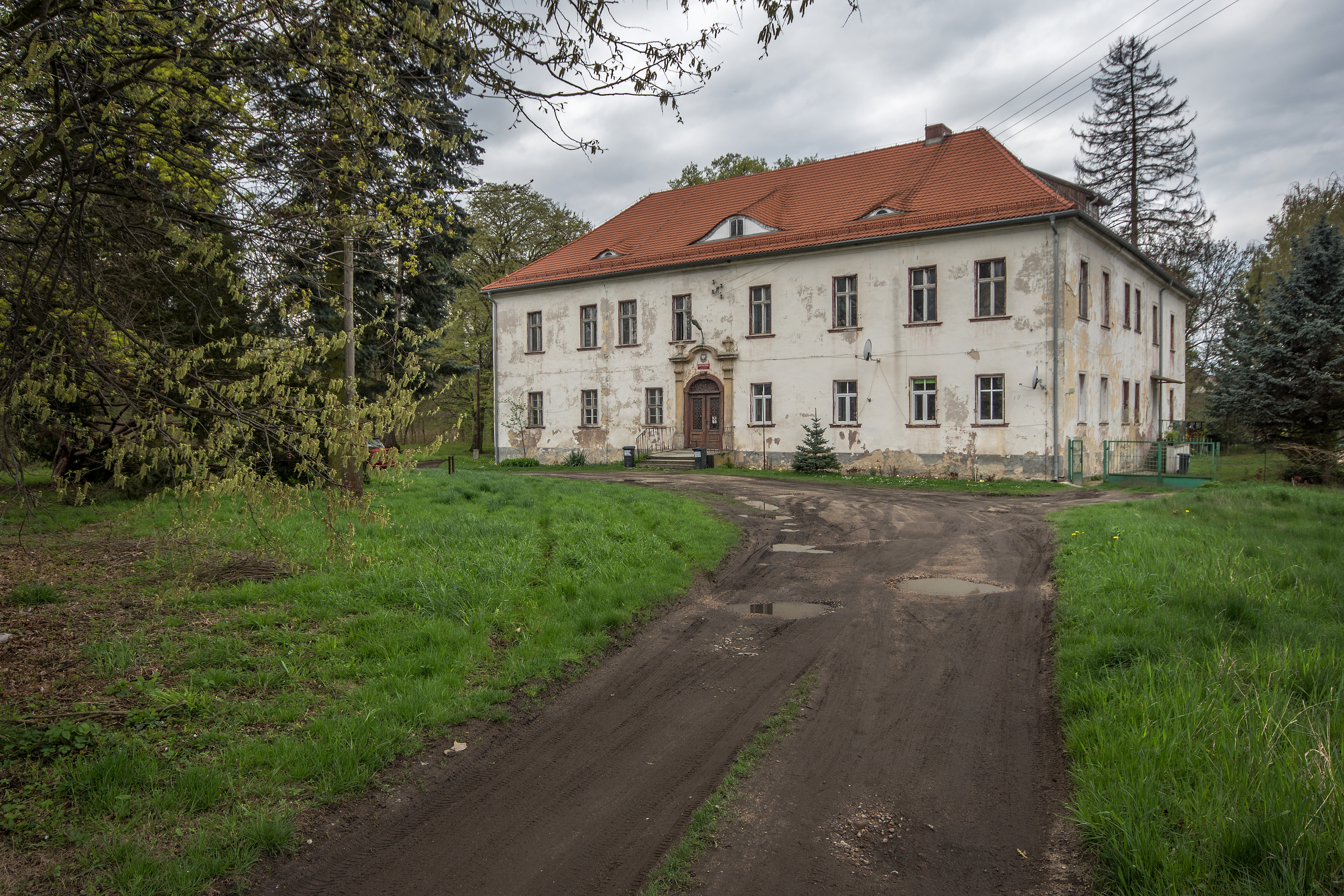

- Location within Poland
- Coordinates: 50°58′37″N 16°41′54″E
- Country: Poland
- Voivodeship: Lower Silesian
- County: Wrocław
- Gmina: Mietków

Milin [ˈmilin] is a village in the administrative district of Gmina Mietków, within Wrocław County, Lower Silesian Voivodeship, in south-western Poland.
