= Town law in Switzerland =

Chartered law of medieval towns in Switzerland

Town law (German: Stadtrecht; French: droit municipal) was the chartered body of law in force in the medieval towns of what is now Switzerland, which set the towns apart from the seigneurial and agrarian countryside and differed from the rural territorial law (Landrecht). Like the latter, town law rested on privileges. It grew as a collection of rights over long periods and was often re-edited several times down to the 19th century. From the 15th century, the town law of the sovereign cantonal capitals increasingly became a subsidiary law ranking above that of their subject towns.

== Origins ==
From the 12th century, the medieval towns of present-day Switzerland developed as distinct legal spheres specializing in trade, crafts, and markets and set apart from their surroundings. A distinction is drawn between grown and founded towns, and between episcopal, imperial, and dynastic towns; in most, however, the town lord granted the burghers their town law as a privilege, whether as a single right (such as a market right) or as a fuller package.

The episcopal towns—all former Roman settlements—came to their own law earliest, usually granted by the bishop only under pressure from the townspeople: Lausanne around 1144, Sion in 1217, Basel in 1264; the town law of Geneva (charter of 1387) probably goes back to 13th-century rights, and the oldest town laws of Chur date from 1368 and 1376. Towns that had grown out of a lay or ecclesiastical lord's estate, such as Zürich (site of a royal palace), St. Gallen, Schaffhausen, and Lucerne, received their first privileges in the 13th and 14th centuries. Towns of imperial rank held directly of the king or the Empire and received their privileges from him, such as Solothurn—a royal palace and a venue for sessions of the Imperial Diet (1038–1052) and the oldest imperial town in Switzerland. In other towns the burghers placed themselves under the direct protection of the Empire to escape their lord or a rival power, as at St. Gallen (1180), Locarno (1186), and Schaffhausen (1190/1191), Zürich, Basel, and Bern in the 13th century, and Lucerne in 1415.

The many, mostly small founded and dynastic towns—only half of which outlasted the Middle Ages—owed their existence to the territorial policy of noble families seeking to secure their power. Among the most important founders were the Zähringen, the Kyburg, and the Habsburgs, as well as the Frohburg and Neuchâtel families in northwestern Switzerland and the Savoy in the west. To make their foundations attractive, they endowed them with town law from the outset; the Zähringen led the way, granting their towns the law of Freiburg im Breisgau (1120), which then served as a model for the towns of the Kyburg, Habsburg, and Savoy.

Some town laws were transferred—sometimes directly, sometimes in modified form—to later foundations, becoming the "mother law" of whole families of town law with complicated filiations. The most widespread, especially in western Switzerland, was that of the two Fribourgs. The law of Lausanne was extended to Avenches and other episcopal towns; that of Bern was taken up at Laupen, Unterseen, and Kirchberg; the Basel model was used at Biel (1275) and later at Delémont and Laufen. For Neuchâtel (1214) the model of Besançon was borrowed, and passed on to Nugerol, Boudry, and Le Landeron. The town law of Konstanz (the Richtebrief) was received by Schaffhausen (1294) and St. Gallen (before 1310), and later by Wil, Bischofszell, Arbon, and Steckborn. The stricter territorial administration of Savoy curtailed some of the burgher liberties of the Zähringen town law when it was transferred to towns in western Switzerland; the law of Moudon in turn became the mother law of an extensive family reaching across Vaud into the Gruyère region. In Ticino, the Bishop of Como granted his towns their own law later than his Lombard towns; that of Lugano (1439) resembles the law of Como, while those of Locarno and Bellinzona survive only in 16th- and 17th-century versions.

== Content and transmission ==
Medieval town law comprised four elements: the keeping of the peace, personal liberty, specific rights, and institutions. The town peace, which the burghers swore to maintain on the town's territory by protecting persons and property, included provisions on the courts and on criminal law. Personal liberty meant that a serf who had spent a year and a day in the town was freed, his lord no longer able to reclaim him ("town air makes free"). The specific rights, adapted to local needs, consisted of rules of civil law (obligations, enforcement, and rules on trade, transport, and the market). The town institutions reflected the communal structure of the medieval town, and the burghers swore an oath to uphold them.

Town law was thus at once a constitution, a code of private law, a penal code, and a code of procedure. It took the form either of a new privilege or of the confirmation of a custom, and always consisted of a rather heterogeneous and incomplete collection with individual characteristics. Applying at first only within the town walls, its reach later extended to the whole district of the town court (the Bannmeile or Burgernziel), and both resident burghers and external burghers were subject to it before the town court; all were equal before it, whatever their social origin. In this, and in its early commitment to writing, town law differed markedly from the arrangements in the countryside.

The commonest form of transmission was a sealed parchment charter, called a Handfeste (from cartam manu firmare, to confirm by hand) or Freiheitsbrief (Latin libertates; French charte de franchises). As their most important legal title, towns had their charters confirmed—sometimes repeatedly—by the town lord or the king down to the 14th century, at considerable expense; even minor towns went through this costly procedure, as at Burgdorf, whose charter was confirmed by the counts of Kyburg in 1300, 1322, and 1326. Owing to their historical value, most of these charters have been published in the Collection of Swiss Law Sources.

== From charter to town statute and cantonal law ==
A town's charter (Handfeste) was the basis of its law, recognized even by the Empire, though not every town that exercised town law held one. In addition to, or in place of, a law granted by the town lord, the burghers swore to law set by the commune itself, known under various names: the sworn letter (geschworener Brief) of Lucerne (1252) or Zürich (1336), the Richtebrief of Zürich (around 1218–1255), Schaffhausen (1291), or St. Gallen (before 1310), and the union (Einung) of Lucerne (1328). Legal opinions requested from another town also entered town law, as when Fribourg advised Burgdorf on inheritance and marriage law in 1274.

From the 14th century, the town councils supplemented these basic rights with their own enactments (town statutes) and with case law that kept pace with institutional and administrative change. Already in the 15th century the heterogeneous chronological collections were brought into some order, and in the 16th century all the larger towns revised and re-recorded their statutes, often aligning them with the terminology and system of Roman law. The results were municipal codes such as the Stadtgerichtsordnung of Basel (1539), the Gerichtssatzung of Bern (1539), and the Gerichtsbuch of Zürich (1553), regarded as mere supplements to the unaltered medieval charters and covering civil, penal, procedural, building, public, and corporate law.

With the development of territorial lordship from the 15th century, the sovereign towns tended to apply their law in their subject towns, whose charters they recognized (or granted, as sovereign, where needed, as at Wiedlisbach in 1516) while reserving a right of supervision and confirmation; they sought above all to check the growth of autonomous town law that might conflict with their own, restricting the competences of subject towns to matters of local interest. During the 16th and 17th centuries the law of the sovereign towns penetrated ever further, directly or through mandates and ordinances, into the town and territorial law of the subject lands, which lost their autonomy. The capitals gave up appealing to their archaic charters and developed their statutes into large, sometimes printed, bodies of law—Bern had its code printed in 1615. In their 18th-century revisions, which sometimes show a markedly more Germanic than Roman conception of the law, the codes' validity was extended in principle to the whole territory, completing their transformation into cantonal law, as at Zürich (Stadt- und Landrecht of 1715) and Bern (Gerichtssatzung of 1761, applying to the capital and the German-speaking towns and countryside but not to Vaud, which had its own law).

Under the Helvetic Republic, the towns, reduced to administrative districts, lost their autonomy; they regained their status in 1803, but the trend was toward equality of rights for citizens and communes alike, whether urban or rural. After 1830, and at the latest in 1874, the Bürgergemeinden had to hand over their political competences to the resident communes, ending their privileges.

== Bibliography ==
- H. Rennefahrt, Grundzüge der bernischen Rechtsgeschichte, 1–2, 1928–1931
- L. Carlen, Rechtsgeschichte der Schweiz, 1968 (3rd ed. 1988)
- J.-F. Poudret, Libertés et franchises dans les pays romands au Moyen Age, 1986
- G. Dilcher, Bürgerrecht und Stadtverfassung im europäischen Mittelalter, 1996, 65–112
- A.-M. Dubler, Die Thuner Handfeste von 1264, 2013

=== Sources ===
- Collection of Swiss Law Sources (SSRQ/SDS)
