= Mietków Lake =

Mietków
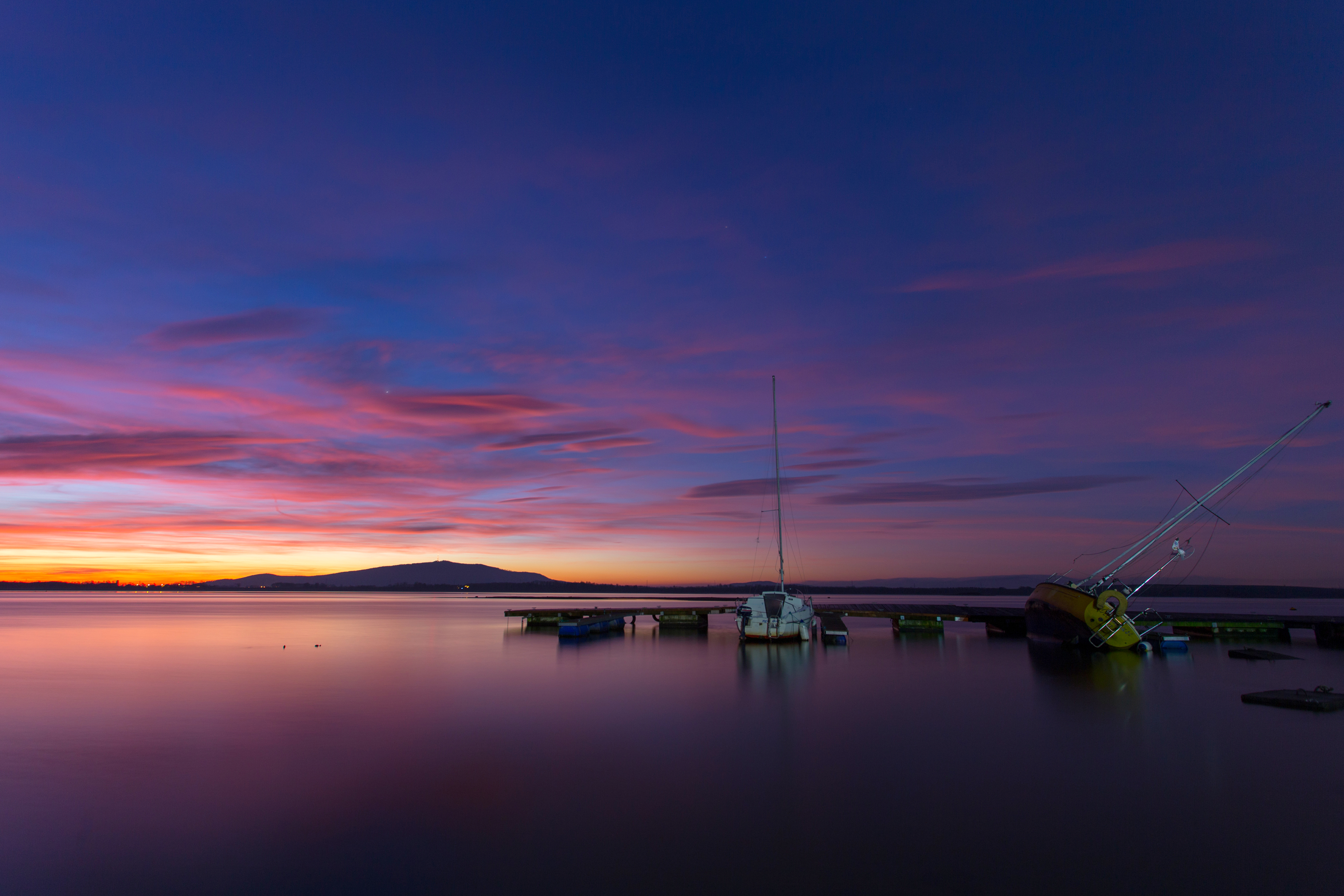
- Mietkowskie Lake

- Location within Lower Silesian Voivodeship Location within Poland
- Coordinates: 50°57′31″N 16°37′08″E
- Type: lake
- Primary outflows: Bystrzyca
- Basin countries: Poland
- Surface area: 9.29 km^{2} (3.59 sq mi)
- Average depth: 11 m (36 ft)
- Water volume: 65×10^{6} m^{3} (53,000 acre⋅ft)
- Surface elevation: 117 m (384 ft)
- Settlements: Mietków

Mietków Lake (Polish: Jezioro Mietkowskie) is the largest lake in the Lower Silesian Voivodeship in Poland. The lake is a retention reservoir created when a dam was built on the river Bystrzyca in Mietków, about 45 kilometres south-west of Wrocław. Geographically the lake is located on the Świdnicka Plain; divided by the Bystrzyca Valley, located in the Bystrzyca Valley Landscape Park. The dam's construction began in 1974, and fully filled in 1986. The lake's dam has a length of 3.2 kilometres and a height of 17 metres. The lake's bank is excavated for aggregate, deepening the lake. The lake's water was lowered and the lake was renovated in 2007 and 2011.
