= Mietków =

- Village
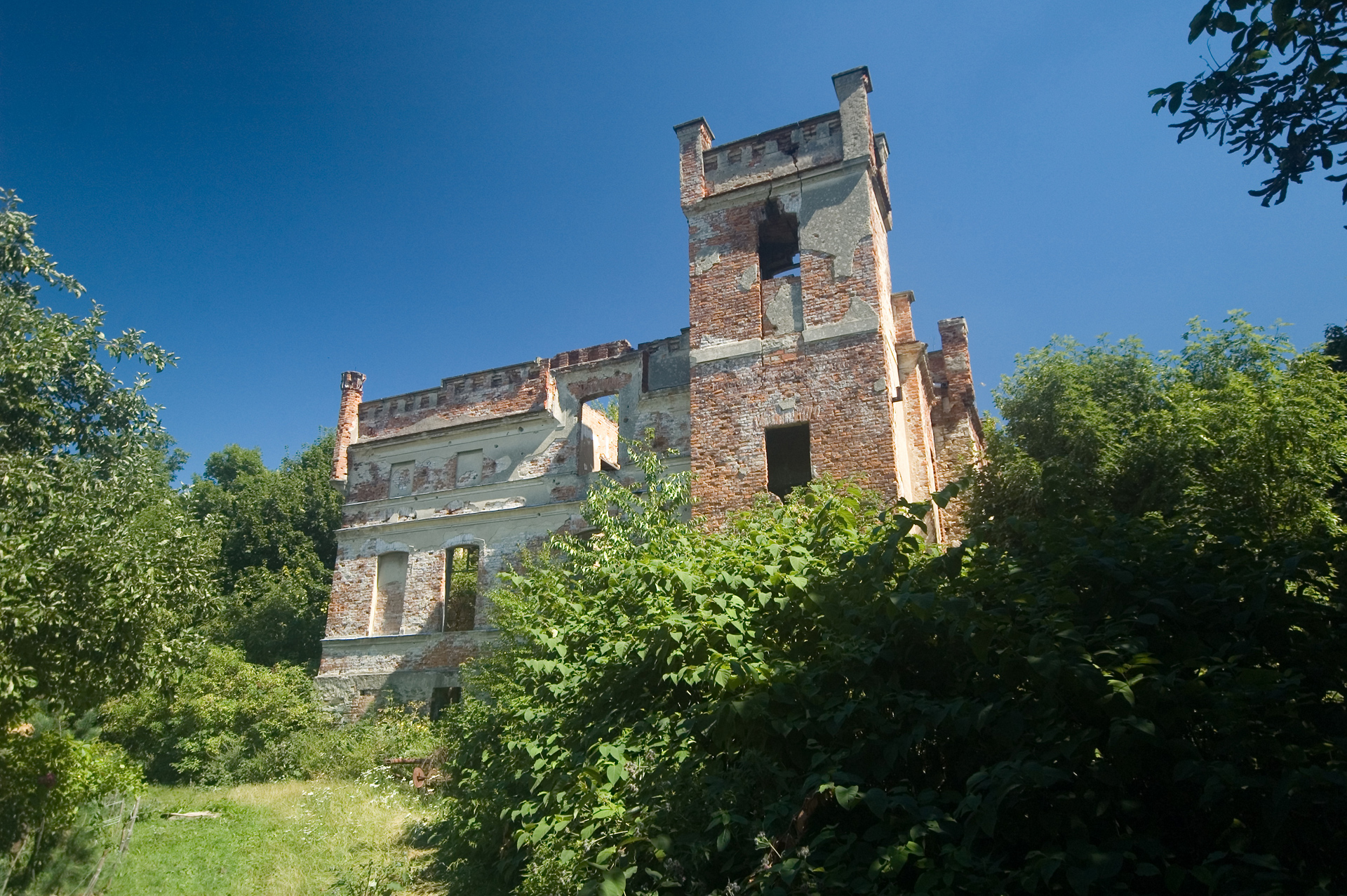
- Manor house (2008)

- Location within Poland
- Coordinates: 50°59′N 16°39′E
- Country: Poland
- Voivodeship: Lower Silesian
- County: Wrocław
- Gmina: Mietków

Mietków [ˈmʲɛtkuf] is a village in the administrative district of Gmina Mietków, Wrocław County, Lower Silesian Voivodeship, in south-western Poland.

== See also ==
- Mietków railway station
- Mietków Lake
