= Stróża, Wrocław County =

Stróża
- Village
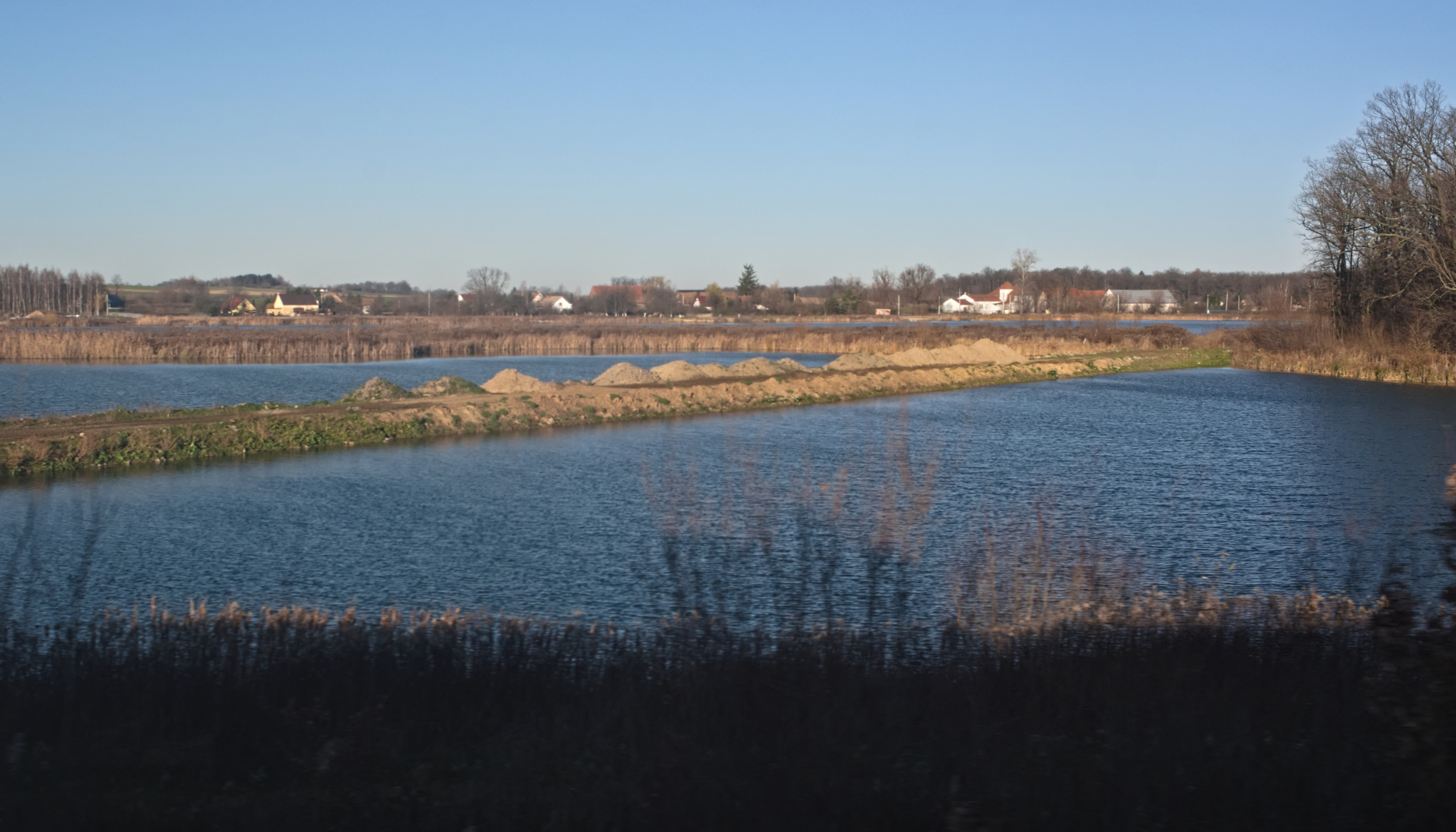
- Ponds near Strzegomka, Stróża in the background (2019)

- Location within Poland
- Coordinates: 51°0′13″N 16°40′38″E
- Country: Poland
- Voivodeship: Lower Silesian
- County: Wrocław
- Gmina: Mietków

Stróża [ˈstruʐa] is a village in the administrative district of Gmina Mietków, within Wrocław County, Lower Silesian Voivodeship, in south-western Poland.
