= Georgenberg Chronicle =

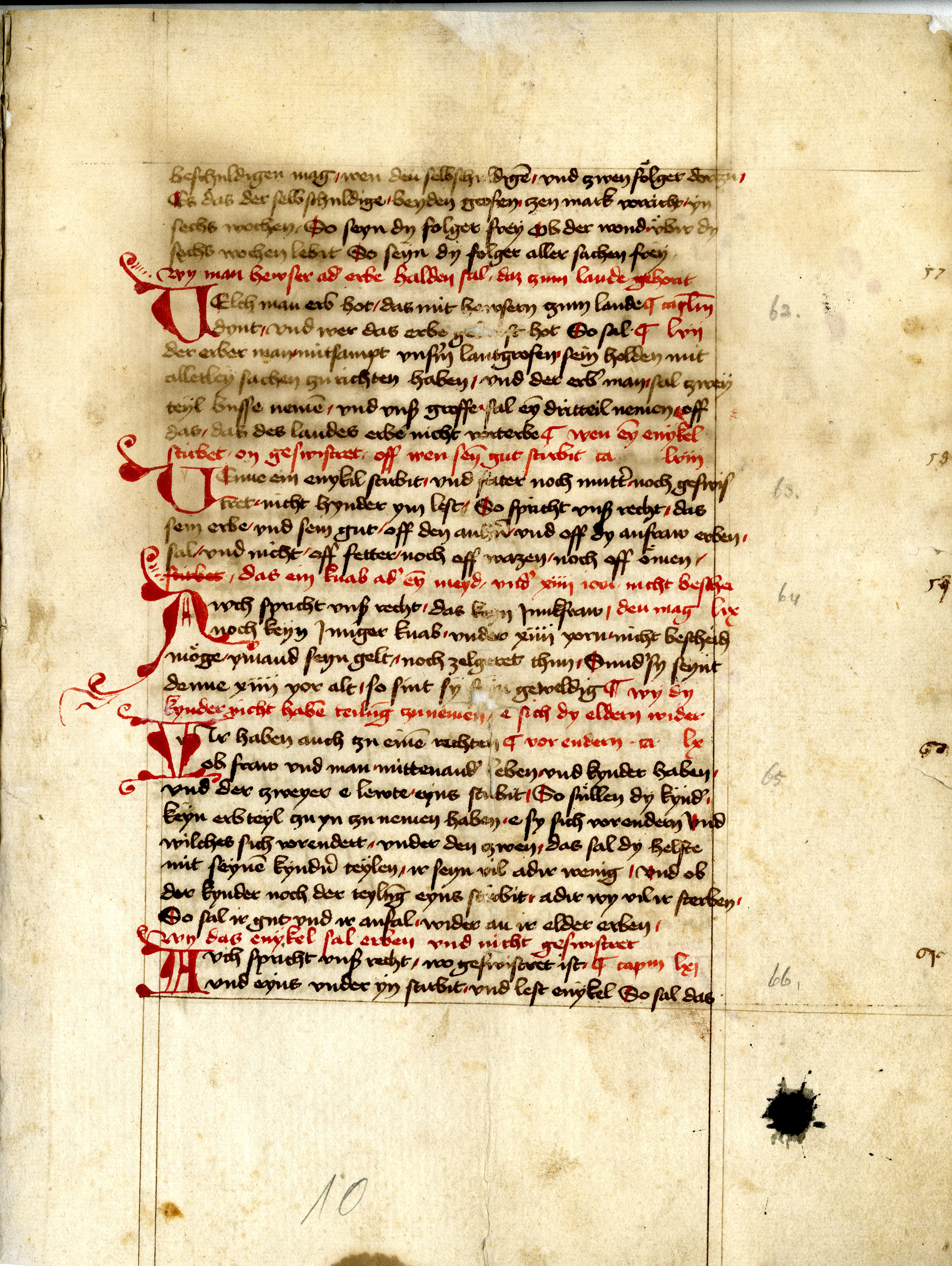
A page of the manuscript written in High German

The Georgenberg Chronicle (German: Georgenberger Chronik), also known as Szepesszombat Chronicle (Hungarian: Szepesszombati krónika, Slovak: Spišskosobotská kronika), is a 15th-century German-language chronicle from the Kingdom of Hungary. It is the oldest surviving historical work belonging to the Zipser Germans, who lived in the region Szepesség (present-day Spiš in Slovakia).

== Manuscript ==
The manuscript was discovered by historian and educator Kálmán Demkó in the archives of Szepesszombat (German: Georgenberg, present-day Spišská Sobota, a borough of Poprad, Slovakia) in 1888. The document has 25 paper folios, while the cover is a parchment certificate dated in Rome. The codex contains the Zipser Willkür (1r–13v; originally 1–75 points, then it was expanded with the remaining 76–90 points in the 16th century), a German translation of King Sigismund's privilege letter for the Zipser Saxons issued in 1433 (14r–18r), and the Georgenberg Chronicle (18v–24v) itself. Only the upper right corners of folios 24 and – otherwise blank – 25 survive.

Apart from the aforementioned 16th-century insertions and additions, the collection of documents can be attributed to the handwriting of a single person. Based on topographic data, it is possible that the author of the chronicle was a Zipser German secular chancellery official from Lőcse (present-day Levoča, Slovakia), who wrote his work in the mid-15th century.

The opening words and capital letters of the chronicle are written in vermilion red, while the years are underlined. The chronicle is written in High German with a simple orthography. The author uses black and red commas placed side by side instead of full stops to end sentences. Its abbreviations reflect the style of the era.

The chronicle was first published by Demkó in 1891. Its critical editions were published by Béla Pukánszky in 1938 and Ilpo Piirainen in 2004. Július Sopko translated it into Slovak with annotations in 1995.

== Content, style and sources ==
Utilizing and extracting the Legenda Hartviciana and the variant of the 14th-century Hungarian chronicle composition compiled under the reign of Louis I of Hungary, the Georgenberg Chronicle narrates the history of the Hungarians from the year 997 until 1457, the execution of Ladislaus Hunyadi. Regarding the events from 997 to 1330, the chronicler extracted the chronicle composition, while in some cases he inserted local events related to the Szepesség into the text corpus. For instance, the chronicle mentions that the Saxons were settled by Béla II to the Szepesség, details the life of St. Elizabeth of Hungary and refers to the foundations of Lőcse and Létánfalva ("Lapis Refugii"; present-day Letanovce, Slovakia). It also mentions that the soldiers of Ladislaus IV plundered the region in 1278 (and thus the Saxons executed a royal official in Csütörtökhely, present-day Spišský Štvrtok) and the escape of Matthew Csák to Lőcse following the Battle of Rozgony in 1312, after Charles I granted privileges to the Szepesség. In addition, the work also narrates the First Mongol invasion of Hungary (1241–1242) from the perspective of the region, utilizing the "Chronica Martiniana", i.e. the work of Martin of Opava. Both manuscripts mention that there was such a famine as a result of the invasion that mothers ate their children and people were forced to eat clay from a certain hill instead of flour.

To the events in the period 1330–1401, the chronicle already uses other sources, but speaks very briefly about this period, because the chronicler struggles with a significant lack of sources, which he admits at one point. While the events between 997 and 1400 covers eight pages, the work narrates the near-contemporary events from 1400 to 1457 in five pages. In the latter phase, his reports are more extensive, the proportion of local events increases significantly (most often in connection with the town of Lőcse and the raids of the Hussites in Upper Hungary, most notably in 1433 and 1453), while he also provides the month and day of the date of several events. From a chronological point of view, the chronicle is quite reliable, especially compared to its contemporaries.

The author is keenly interested in the ethnography of Hungary and the Szepesség region, as well as in the crusades, in which he emphasizes the leading role of German forces. He considers the greatest Hungarian rulers to be of German ethnic origin, and highlights the loyalty of the German-speaking Szepesség to the Hungarian monarchs. His general observations include that the settling Germans founded towns and villages in Hungary. The author's Germanness is revealed in a self-conscious manner, emphasizing their excellence and loyalty. According to the chronicler, majority of the most powerful Hungarian families were of German origin. Since the text does not give any prominence to events affecting the local church, it can be concluded that the author was a layman.

== Legacy ==
The Georgenberg Chronicle served as the primary source for various later German-language chronicles from the Kingdom of Hungary. In terms of content and form, it is the archetype of many later German chronicles of the Szepesség region. The 17th-century historian Caspar Hain listed these works in his chronicle, including the diary of notary Konrad Sperfogel. Several chapters of the chronicle of Lutheran pastor Joachim Leibitzer is literally identical to the text of the Georgenberg Chronicle.

== See also ==
- List of Hungarian chronicles

== Sources ==
- Demkó, Kálmán (1891). A Szepes-szombati krónika [The Szepesszombat Chronicle] (in Hungarian). Szepesmegyei Történelmi Társulat.
- Karsai, Géza (1963). "Névtelenség, névrejtés és szerzői név a középkori krónikákban [Anonymity and Authorship in Medieval Chronicles]". Századok (in Hungarian). 97 (3). Magyar Történelmi Társulat: 666–677. ISSN 0039-8098.
- Kertész, Balázs (2016). "A 14. századi magyarországi krónikaszerkesztmények utóélete a késő középkorban" [The afterlife of 14th-century Hungarian chronicle compilations in the late Middle Ages] (PDF). Századok – A magyar történelmi társulat folyóirata [Magazine of the Hungarian Historical Society] (in Hungarian). 150 (2). Budapest: 473–499. ISSN 0039-8098.
- Kristó, Gyula (2002). Magyar historiográfia I. Történetírás a középkori Magyarországon [Hungarian Historiography I. History Writing in Medieval Hungary] (in Hungarian). Osiris. ISBN 978-963-389-261-9.
- Mossman, Stephen (2010). "Georgenberger Chronik". In Dunphy, Graeme (ed.). Encyclopedia of the Medieval Chronicle. Leiden: Brill. p. 685. ISBN 90-04-18464-3.
- Pukánszky, Béla (1926). A magyarországi német irodalom története a legrégibb időktől 1848-ig [The History of German Literature in Hungary from the Earliest Times to 1848] (in Hungarian). Német philologiai dolgozatok 31., Budavári Tudományos Társaság.
