= Gmina Mietków =

Gmina Mietków Mietków Commune
- Gmina
- Flag Coat of arms
- Interactive map of Gmina Mietków
- Coordinates (Mietków): 50°59′N 16°39′E
- Country: Poland
- Voivodeship: Lower Silesian
- County: Wrocław
- Seat: Mietków
- Sołectwos: Borzygniew, Chwałów, Domanice, Dzikowa, Maniów, Maniów Mały, Maniów Wielki, Mietków, Milin, Piława, Proszkowice, Stróża, Ujów, Wawrzeńczyce

Area
  - Total: 83.3 km^{2} (32.2 sq mi)

Population (2019-06-30)
  - Total: 3,767
  - Density: 45.2/km^{2} (117/sq mi)
- Website: https://mietkow.pl

Gmina Mietków is a rural gmina (administrative district) in Wrocław County, Lower Silesian Voivodeship, in south-western Poland. Its seat is the village of Mietków, which lies approximately 32 kilometres (20 mi) south-west of the regional capital Wrocław.

The gmina covers an area of 83.3 square kilometres (32.2 sq mi), and as of 2019 its total population is 3,767.

== Neighbouring gminas ==
Gmina Mietków is bordered by the gminas of Kąty Wrocławskie, Kostomłoty, Marcinowice, Sobótka and Żarów.

== Villages ==
The gmina contains the villages of Borzygniew, Chwałów, Domanice, Dzikowa, Maniów, Maniów Mały, Maniów Wielki, Mietków, Milin, Piława, Proszkowice, Stróża, Ujów and Wawrzeńczyce.
