= Domanice, Wrocław County =

Domanice
- Village
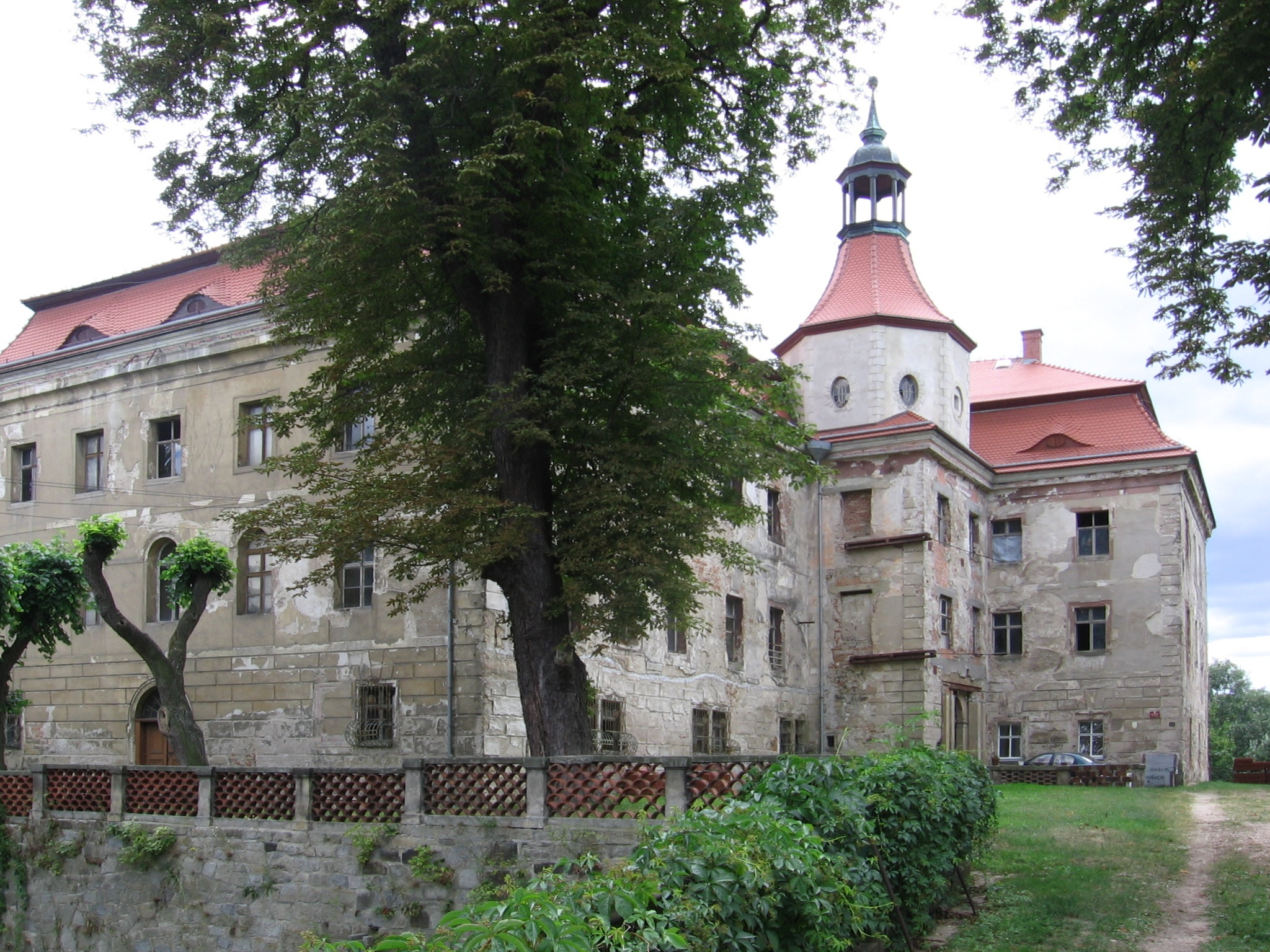
- Domanice Palace

- Location within Poland
- Coordinates: 50°56′25″N 16°35′29″E
- Country: Poland
- Voivodeship: Lower Silesian
- County: Wrocław
- Gmina: Mietków
- Time zone: UTC+1 (CET)
  - Summer (DST): UTC+2 (CEST)

Domanice [dɔmaˈnit͡sɛ] is a village in the administrative district of Gmina Mietków, within Wrocław County, Lower Silesian Voivodeship, in south-western Poland.
