= Proszkowice =

- Village
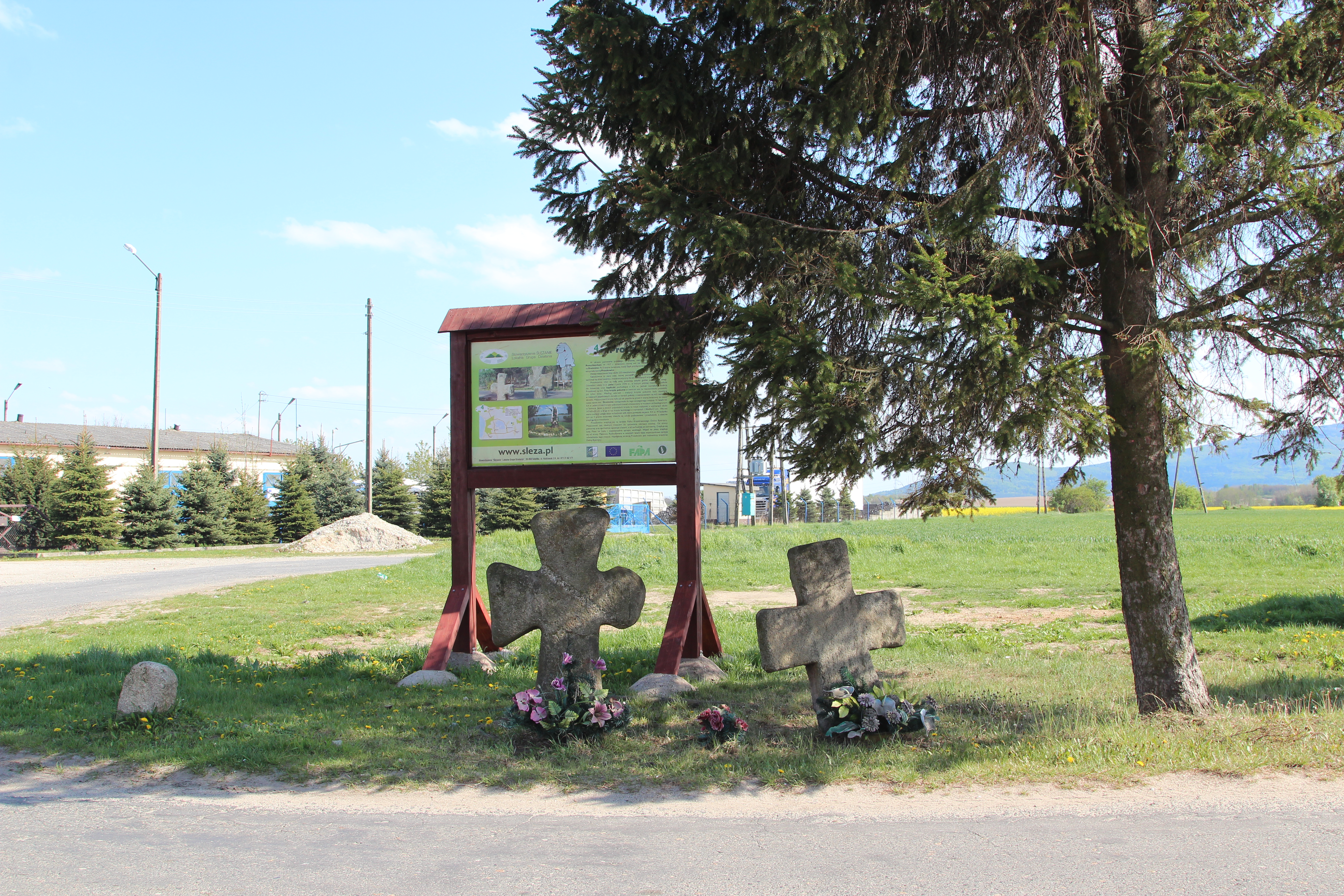

- Location within Poland
- Coordinates: 50°57′31″N 16°40′51″E
- Country: Poland
- Voivodeship: Lower Silesian
- County: Wrocław
- Gmina: Mietków
- Population (approx.): 250

Proszkowice [prɔʂkɔˈvit͡sɛ] is a village in the administrative district of Gmina Mietków, within Wrocław County, Lower Silesian Voivodeship, in south-western Poland.
