= Dzikowa =

- Village
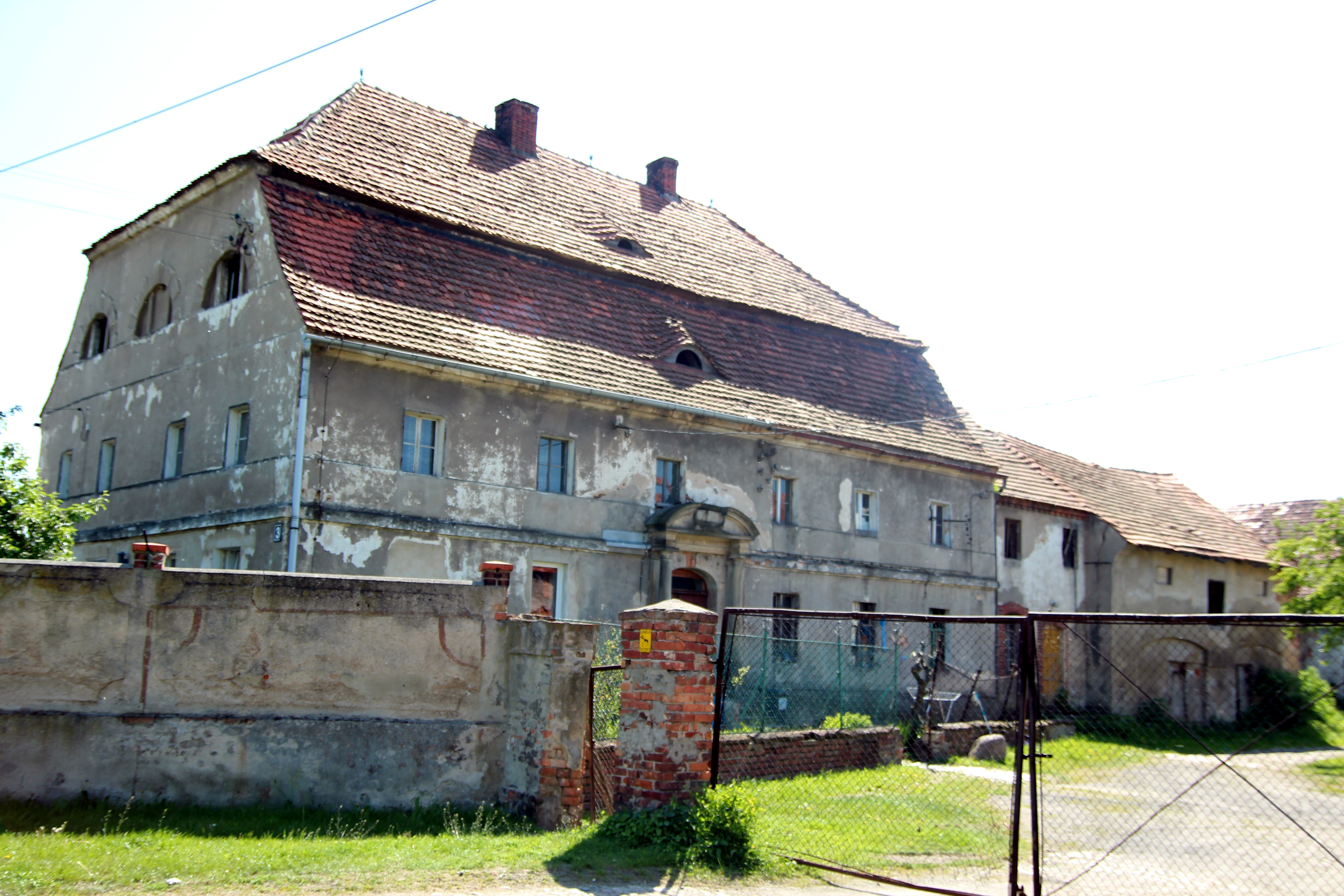

- Location within Poland
- Coordinates: 50°59′N 16°38′E
- Country: Poland
- Voivodeship: Lower Silesian
- County: Wrocław
- Gmina: Mietków

Dzikowa [d͡ʑiˈkɔva] is a village in the administrative district of Gmina Mietków, within Wrocław County, Lower Silesian Voivodeship, in south-western Poland.
