= Maniów Wielki =

- Village
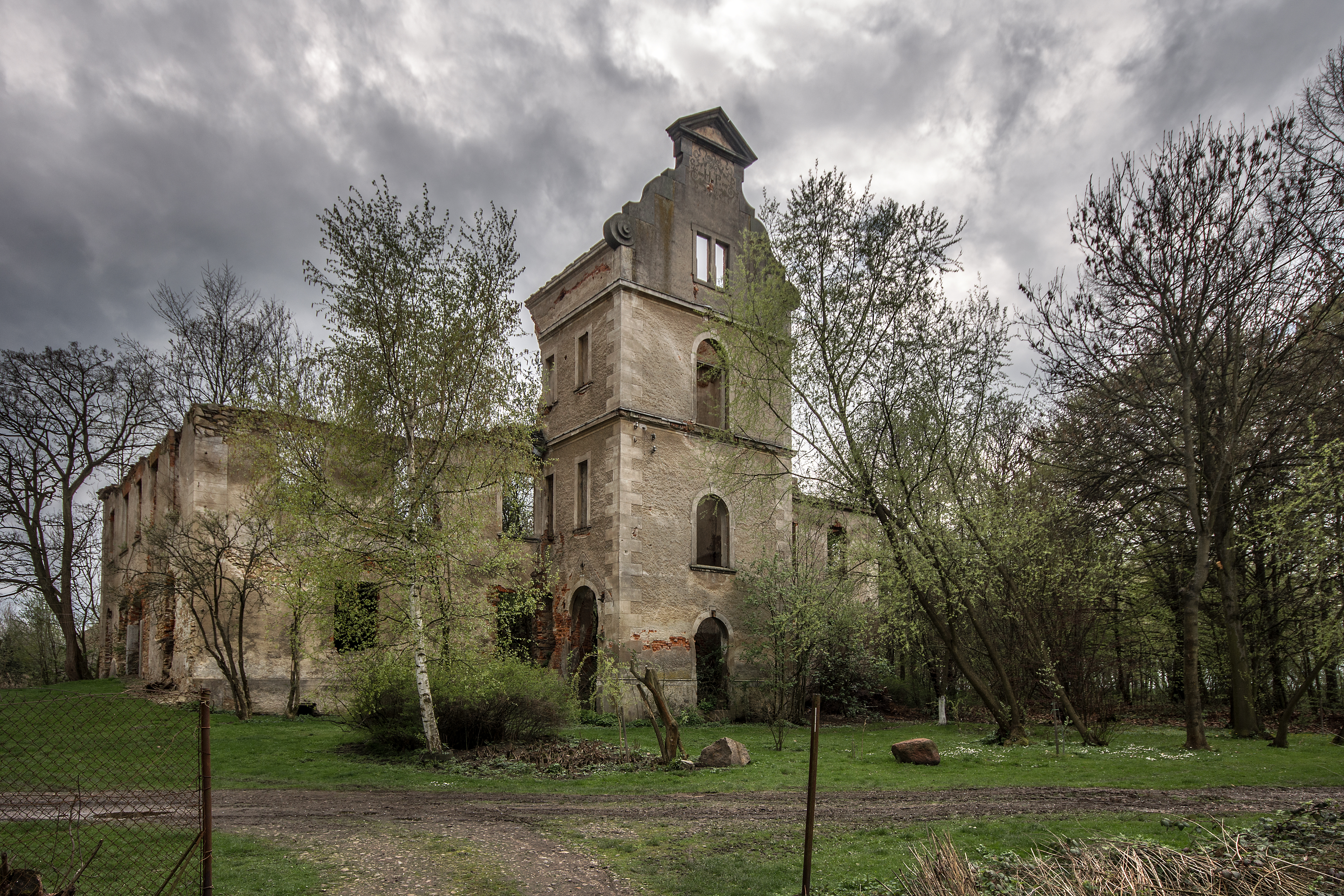
- Palace

- Location within Poland
- Coordinates: 50°57′19″N 16°41′50″E
- Country: Poland
- Voivodeship: Lower Silesian
- County: Wrocław
- Gmina: Mietków

Maniów Wielki (Polish pronunciation: [ˈmaɲuv ˈvjɛlkʲi]) is a village in the administrative district of Gmina Mietków, within Wrocław County, Lower Silesian Voivodeship, in south-western Poland.
