= Ujów =

- Village
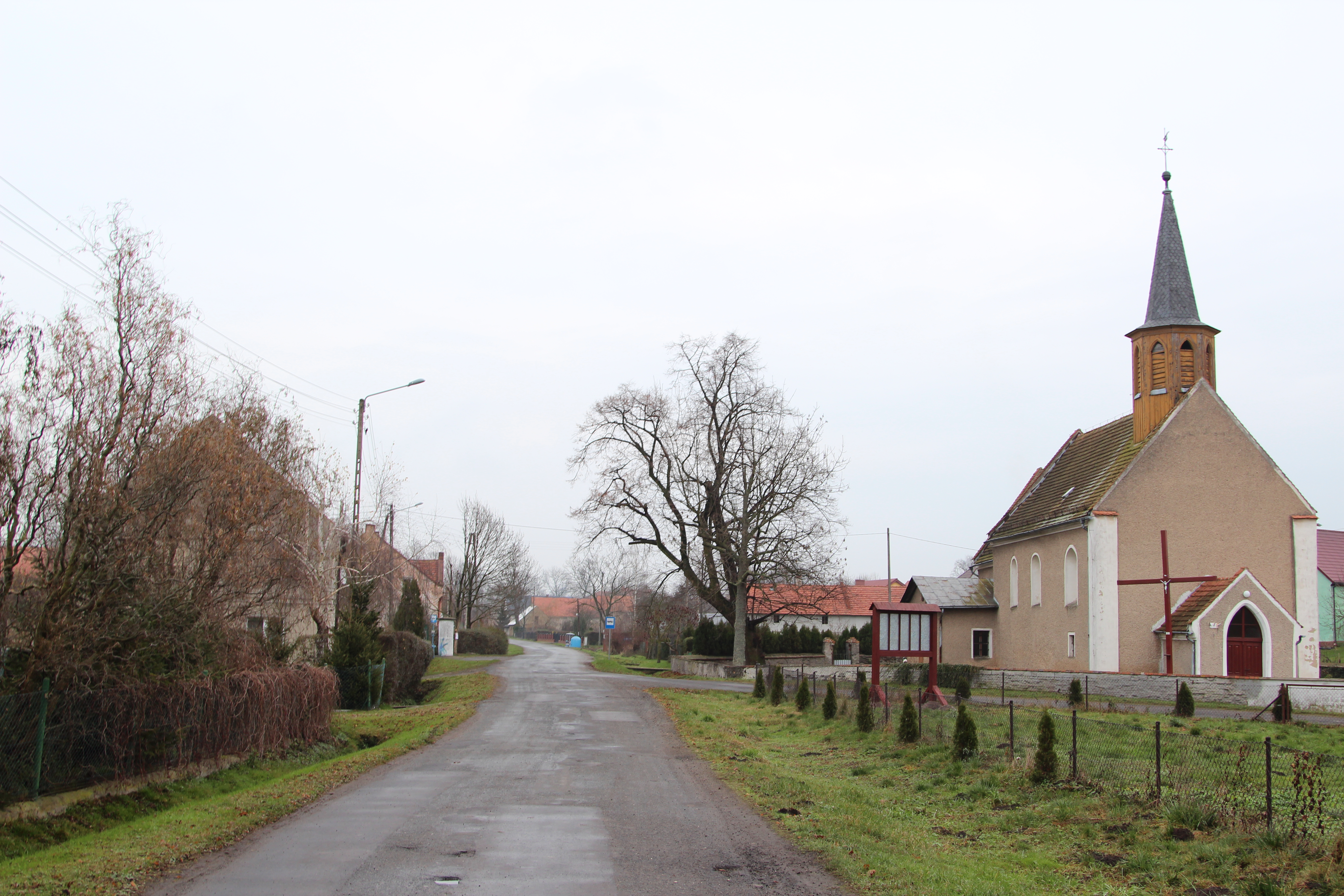
- Ujow general view 2014

- Location within Poland
- Coordinates: 51°0′N 16°37′E
- Country: Poland
- Voivodeship: Lower Silesian
- County: Wrocław
- Gmina: Mietków

Ujów [ˈujuf] is a village in the administrative district of Gmina Mietków, within Wrocław County, Lower Silesian Voivodeship, in south-western Poland.
