= Lübeck law =

Form of municipal law in medieval and early modern Germany

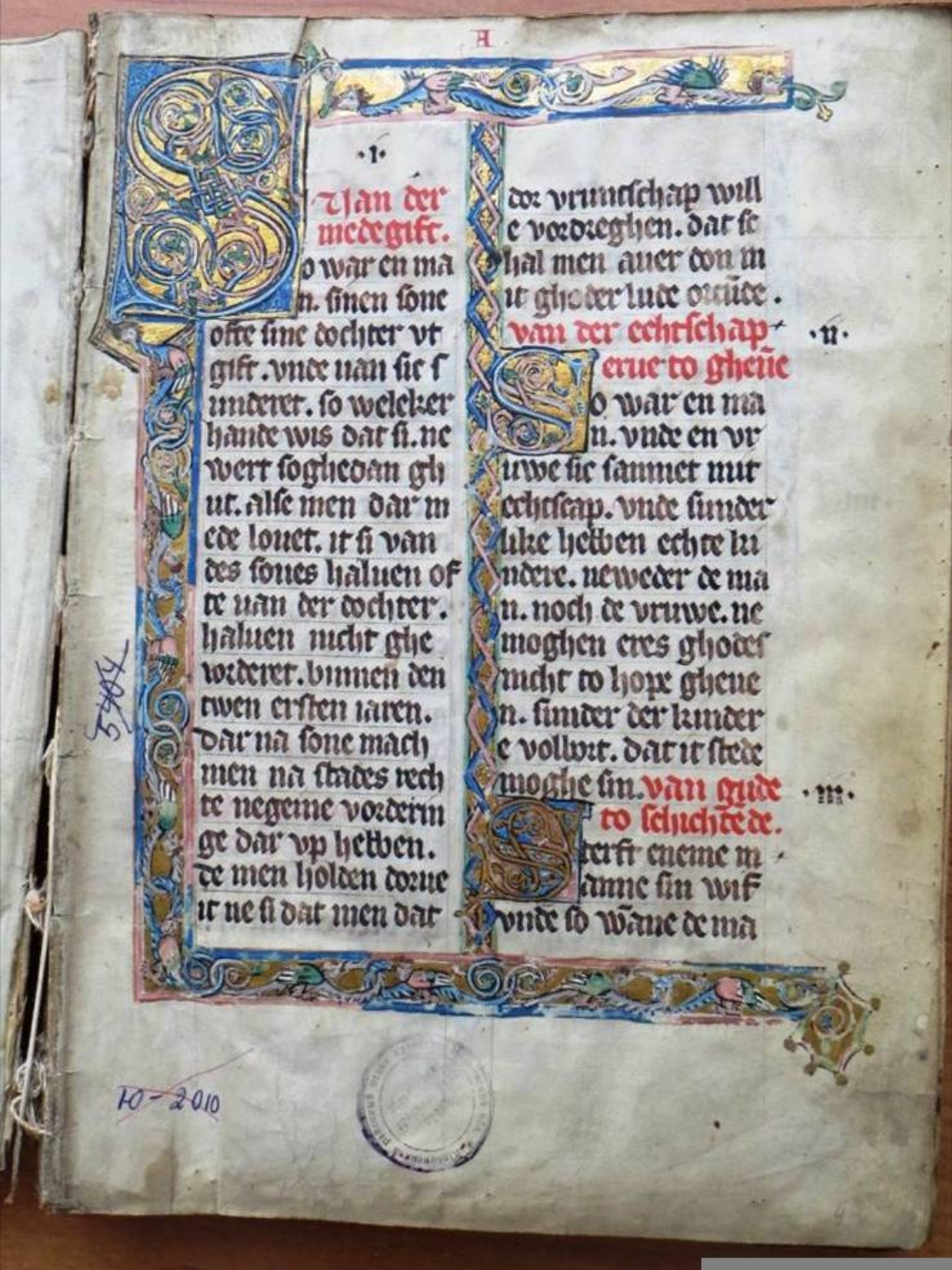
"Bardewik Codex" of Lübeck Law, written in 1294, Jurjewetz, Kunsthist. Museum I-OKM-2010

The Lübeck law (German: Lübisches (Stadt)Recht) was the family of codified municipal law developed at Lübeck, which became a free imperial city in 1226 and is located in present-day Schleswig-Holstein. It was the second most prevalent form of municipal law in medieval and early modern Germany next to the Magdeburg Law.

Lübeck Law provided for municipal self-government and self-administration yet did not negate dependence upon a lord, be it a bishop, duke, king or, in Lübeck's case, an emperor. Instead, it allowed the cities a certain degree of autonomy and self-reliance in legislative, judicial and executive matters. While these authorities were vested in the city council (Rat), the members of which could be elected by co-option, the Lübeck Law represents a significant modernization of governance in that a class of burghers, as opposed to nobles, were responsible for the day-to-day affairs of governing.

The Lübeck Law is not analogous to Hanseatic law. Hanseatic cities adopted either Lübeck or Magdeburg law.

== History ==
Lübeck set about spreading its form of government to other cities around the Baltic Sea. Eventually about 100 adopted a government based on the law. It still serves as a foundation for German town laws in many of those cities. Later in the 13th century, cities predominantly governed by the Lübeck Law formed into a powerful trade association, the Hanseatic League, which amounted to a quasi-confederacy with headquarters at Lübeck. However, by the 15th century, major kontore and smaller trading posts of the Hanse, which was then at the high point of its influence, spread throughout northern Central Europe and the British Isles, from London to Veliky Novgorod and from Trondheim to Frankfurt, dominating trade far beyond German-speaking regions and also far beyond the cities where Lübeck law was in force.

The earliest Latin manuscript transmitting the Lubeck law dates to 1226, the oldest Middle Low German manuscript to 1270. The earliest reference to a Lübeck law manuscript is attributed to 1188. The Lübeck law is influenced by the merchants from Westphalia who settled Lübeck as well as by the Holstein land law and the Schleswig Law.

Lübeck law was prevalent throughout cities in Northern and Northeastern Germany (Niederdeutschland) until 1900, when the modern German civil code (Bürgerliches Gesetzbuch) was implemented.

== Main principle ==
The Lübeck law provided that a city should be governed by a Rat (Council), having 20 Ratsherrn (council members). (Note: Ratsherr literally meant "council lord", with Herr meaning "lord" in those days; Herrn or Herren is the plural of Herr. A similar institution were the Domherrn or Domherren, literally "cathedral lords", who governed the cathedral and its affairs in a town that had a bishop's see.) They were not elected by the citizens, but they would appoint a new member on their own from the city's merchant guilds. This was considered a key to representation of the guilds in the Rat of the city. The period of office was in principle 2 years, but the Rat could ask a Ratsherr to stay in office, which usually happened, so that the election was effectively for life.

The Rat elected up to four Bürgermeister (burgomaster, mayor) from its members, who shared the power of government. The "first burgomaster", usually the eldest of them, acted as a primus inter pares. These rules were in force up to the middle of the 19th century. The burgomasters stayed in office as long as they could. There are several examples from the Middle Ages in which burgomasters of Hanseatic League cities were sentenced to death for unsuccessful politics.

This model of a city government provided that only the most experienced, influential and personally most successful merchants – and a few lawyers, called syndics – became members of the Rat. It was also a rule that a father and his son, or brothers, could never be members of the Rat at the same time, so that influential families could not get too large a share of influence on the city's politics.

== Cities with Lübeck law ==
- Lübeck
- 1188 - Hamburg
- 1218 - Rostock
- 1226 - Wittenburg
- 1234 - Stralsund
- 1235 - Gdańsk
- 1236 - Plön
- 1238 - Itzehoe
- 1242 - Kiel
- 1243 - Tønder
- 1246 - Elbing (Elbląg)
- 1248 - Reval (Tallinn)
- 1250 - Greifswald
- 1253 - Damgarten
- 1254 or 1258 - Memel (Klaipėda)
- 1255 - Kolberg (Kołobrzeg)
- 1260 - Dirschau (Tczew)
- before 1263 - Gdańsk (Danzig), the name used there was e.g. Danceke
- 1282 - Wolgast
- 1282 - Wilster
- 1284 - Braunsberg (Braniewo)
- 1302 - Wesenberg (Rakvere)
- 1310 - Stolp (Słupsk)
- 1310 - Neustettin (Szczecinek)
- 1312 - Rügenwalde (Darłowo)
- 1313 - Pollnow (Polanów)
- 1317 - Schlawe (Sławno)
- 1343 - Zanow (Sianów)
- 1345 - Narwa (Narva) (until 1585)
- 1585 - Hapsal (Haapsalu)
- 1613 - Bergen auf Rügen
- Wismar

== See also ==
- German town law
- Kulm law
- Magdeburg rights
