= Kalino =

Kalino may refer to:

- Kalino, Bulgaria, a village in Bulgaria
- Kalino, Poland, a village in Łódź Voivodeship, Poland
- Kalino, Russia, name of several inhabited localities in Russia
