= Gmina Rzgów =

Gmina Rzgów may refer to either of the following administrative districts in Poland:

- Gmina Rzgów, Greater Poland Voivodeship
- Gmina Rzgów, Łódź Voivodeship
