= Tadzin =

Tadzin may refer to the following places:

- Tadzin, Kuyavian-Pomeranian Voivodeship (north-central Poland)
- Tadzin, Brzeziny County in Łódź Voivodeship (central Poland)
- Tadzin, Łódź East County in Łódź Voivodeship (central Poland)
