= Stara Gadka =

- Village
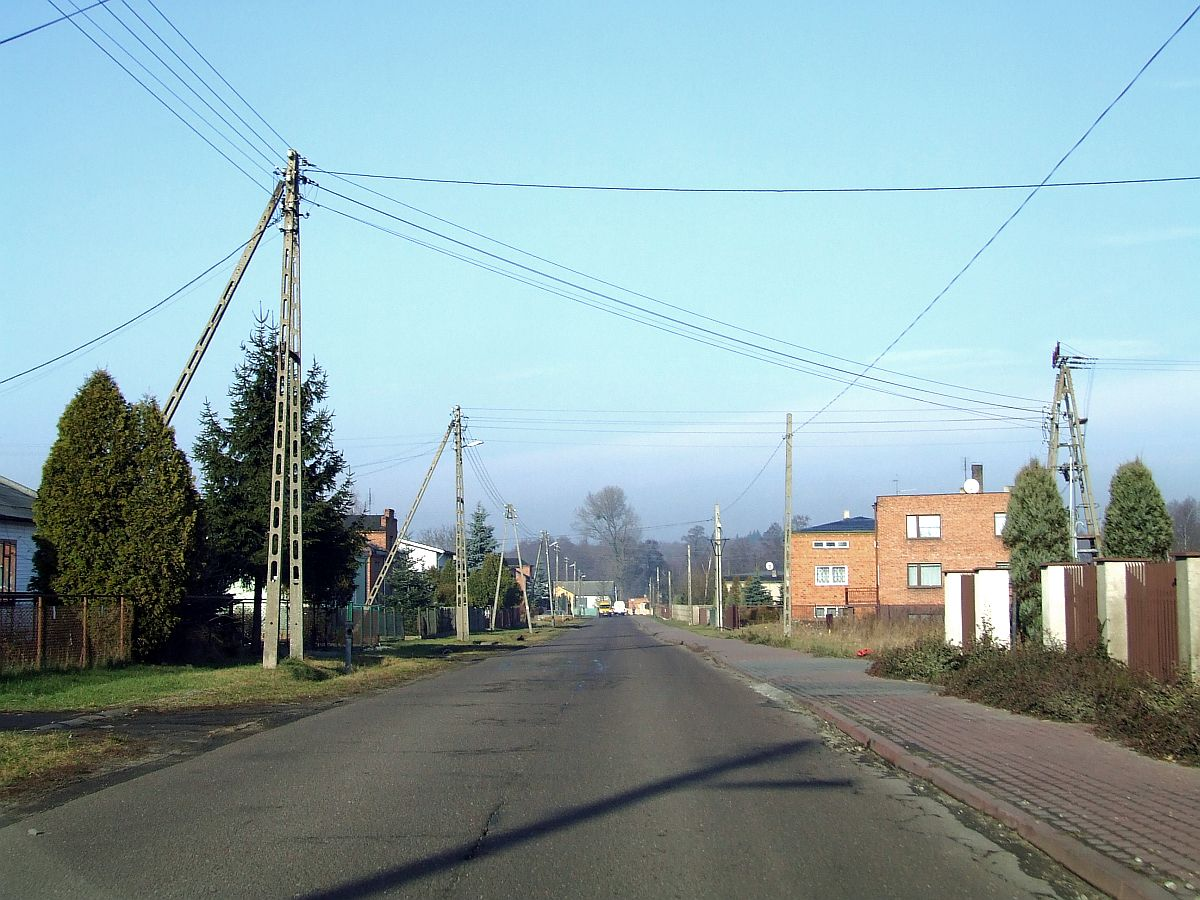
- Stara Gadka in 2007

- Location within Poland
- Coordinates: 51°41′N 19°27′E
- Country: Poland
- Voivodeship: Łódź
- County: Łódź East
- Gmina: Rzgów
- Time zone: UTC+1 (CET)
  - Summer (DST): UTC+2 (CEST)
- Vehicle registration: ELW

Stara Gadka (Polish pronunciation: [ˈstara ˈɡatka]) is a village in the administrative district of Gmina Rzgów, within Łódź East County, Łódź Voivodeship, in central Poland. It is situated on the Ner River.

== History ==
Historical population
Year	Pop.
1827	179
1921	508

Stara Gadka was a private church village of the Kraków Cathedral Chapter, administratively located in the Greater Poland Province of the Kingdom of Poland.

Following the joint German-Soviet invasion of Poland, which started World War II in September 1939, the village was occupied by Germany until 1945. In July 1940, the occupiers carried out expulsions of Poles, who were deported to a transit camp in Łódź and then to the Lublin District in the more-eastern part of German-occupied Poland, while their houses were handed over to German colonists as part of the Lebensraum policy.

== Climate ==
Stara Gadka has a humid continental climate (Cfb in the Köppen climate classification).

Climate data for Stara Gadka
Month	Jan	Feb	Mar	Apr	May	Jun	Jul	Aug	Sep	Oct	Nov	Dec	Year
Mean daily maximum °C (°F)	0.3 (32.5)	2.1 (35.8)	6.9 (44.4)	13.6 (56.5)	18.5 (65.3)	21.7 (71.1)	23.7 (74.7)	23.5 (74.3)	18.6 (65.5)	12.7 (54.9)	7.2 (45.0)	2.4 (36.3)	12.6 (54.7)
Daily mean °C (°F)	−2.0 (28.4)	−0.8 (30.6)	3.0 (37.4)	8.9 (48.0)	14.0 (57.2)	17.5 (63.5)	19.5 (67.1)	19.1 (66.4)	14.5 (58.1)	9.3 (48.7)	4.7 (40.5)	0.4 (32.7)	9.0 (48.2)
Mean daily minimum °C (°F)	−4.5 (23.9)	−3.9 (25.0)	−1.0 (30.2)	3.8 (38.8)	8.9 (48.0)	12.5 (54.5)	14.8 (58.6)	14.5 (58.1)	10.4 (50.7)	6.1 (43.0)	2.3 (36.1)	−1.7 (28.9)	5.2 (41.3)
Average precipitation mm (inches)	48 (1.9)	44 (1.7)	52 (2.0)	51 (2.0)	74 (2.9)	72 (2.8)	96 (3.8)	66 (2.6)	62 (2.4)	48 (1.9)	48 (1.9)	51 (2.0)	712 (27.9)
Source: https://en.climate-data.org/europe/poland/%c5%82odz-voivodeship/stara-gadka-859640/
