= Prawda, Łódź Voivodeship =

Prawda
- Village
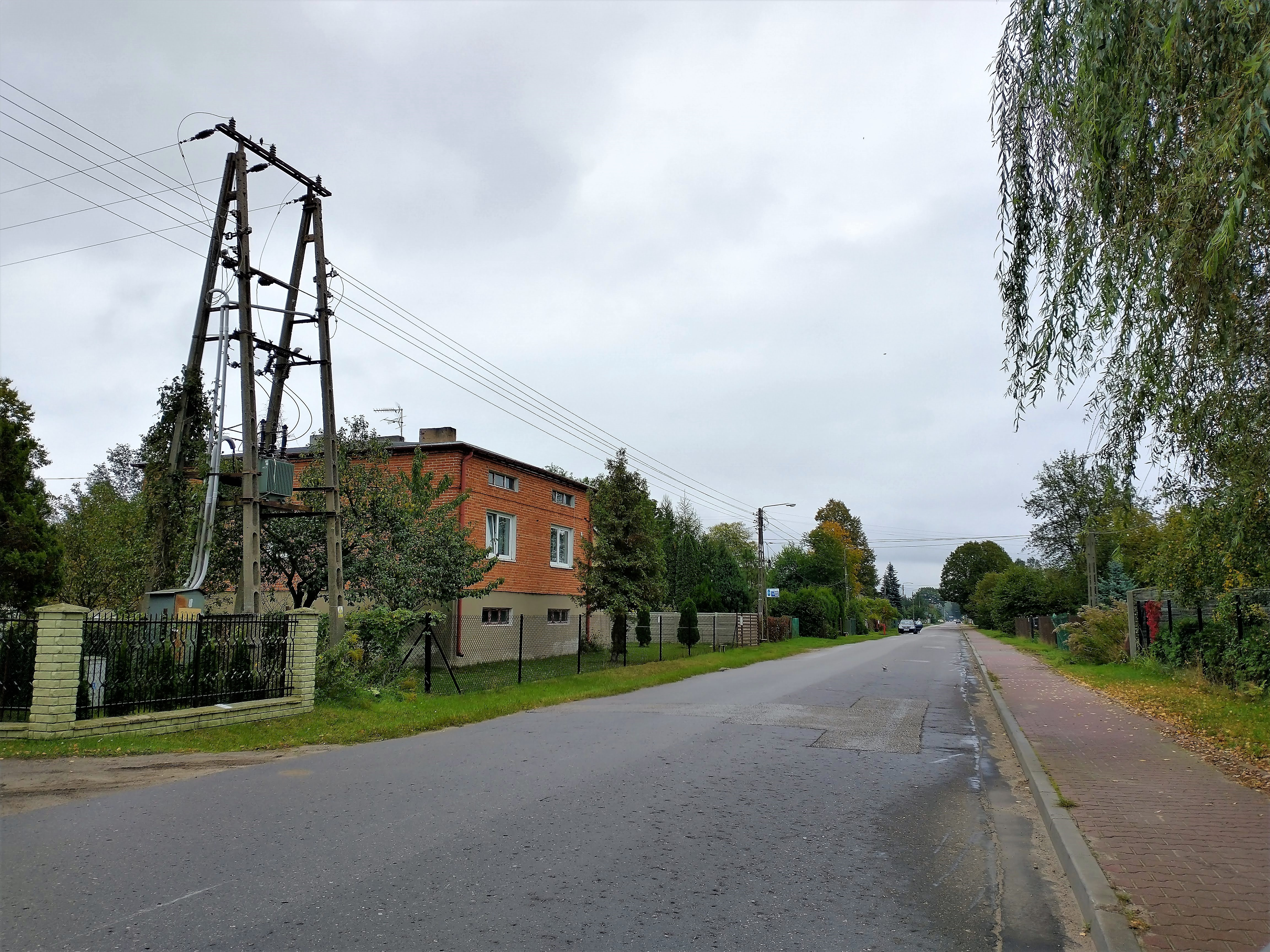

- Location within Poland
- Coordinates: 51°38′N 19°28′E
- Country: Poland
- Voivodeship: Łódź
- County: Łódź East
- Gmina: Rzgów

Prawda [ˈpravda] is a village in the administrative district of Gmina Rzgów, within Łódź East County, Łódź Voivodeship, in central Poland.

== Climate ==
Prawda has a humid continental climate (Cfb in the Köppen climate classification).

Climate data for Prawda
Month	Jan	Feb	Mar	Apr	May	Jun	Jul	Aug	Sep	Oct	Nov	Dec	Year
Mean daily maximum °C (°F)	0.4 (32.7)	2.2 (36.0)	7.0 (44.6)	13.6 (56.5)	18.5 (65.3)	21.8 (71.2)	23.7 (74.7)	23.6 (74.5)	18.7 (65.7)	12.8 (55.0)	7.2 (45.0)	2.5 (36.5)	12.7 (54.8)
Daily mean °C (°F)	−1.9 (28.6)	−0.7 (30.7)	3.1 (37.6)	9.0 (48.2)	14.1 (57.4)	17.6 (63.7)	19.6 (67.3)	19.2 (66.6)	14.6 (58.3)	9.4 (48.9)	4.8 (40.6)	0.5 (32.9)	9.1 (48.4)
Mean daily minimum °C (°F)	−4.2 (24.4)	−3.6 (25.5)	−0.8 (30.6)	4.0 (39.2)	9.1 (48.4)	12.7 (54.9)	15.0 (59.0)	14.6 (58.3)	10.5 (50.9)	6.2 (43.2)	2.3 (36.1)	−1.6 (29.1)	5.4 (41.6)
Average precipitation mm (inches)	48 (1.9)	44 (1.7)	52 (2.0)	51 (2.0)	74 (2.9)	72 (2.8)	96 (3.8)	66 (2.6)	62 (2.4)	48 (1.9)	48 (1.9)	51 (2.0)	712 (27.9)
Source: https://en.climate-data.org/europe/poland/łodz-voivodeship/prawda-92652/
