= Rzgów =

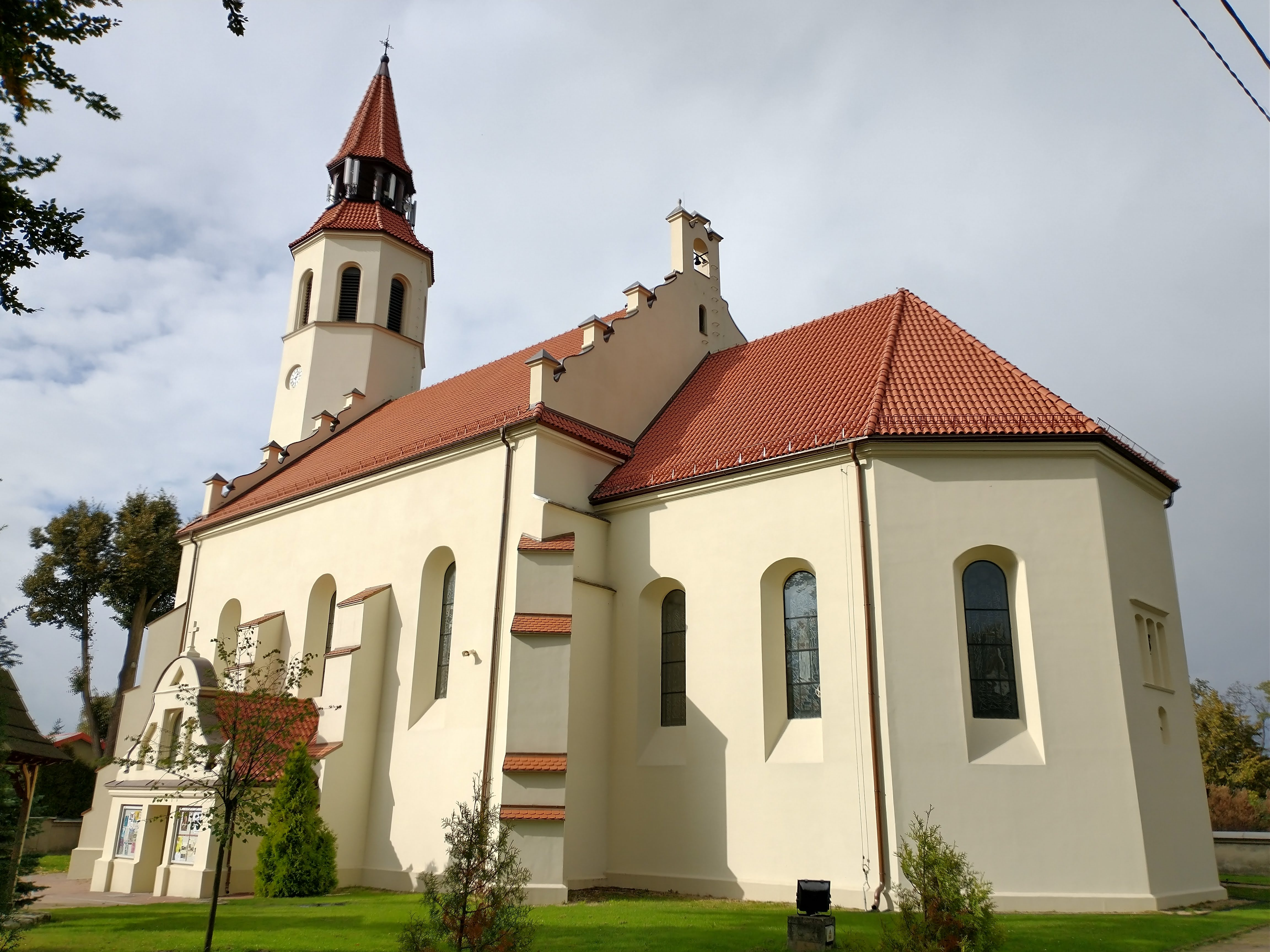
- Church of Saint Stanislaus

- Flag Coat of arms

- Location within Poland
- Coordinates: 51°39′44″N 19°27′35″E
- Country: Poland
- Voivodeship: Łódź
- County: Łódź East
- Gmina: Rzgów

Government
  - Mayor: Mateusz Kamiński

Population (31 December 2020)
  - Total: 3,382 ▲
- Time zone: UTC+1 (CET)
  - Summer (DST): UTC+2 (CEST)
- Postal code: 95-030
- Vehicle registration: ELW
- Website: http://www.rzgow.pl/

Rzgów [ʐɡuf] is a town in Łódź East County, Łódź Voivodeship, in central Poland, with 3,382 inhabitants (2020). It is situated on the Ner River within the Sieradz Land. The town is a member of Cittaslow.

== History ==
It was incorporated as a town in 1467. It was a private church town, administratively located in the Piotrków County in the Sieradz Voivodeship in the Greater Poland Province of the Kingdom of Poland. In 1870 it was downgraded to a village. In 1469, the Kraków Cathedral Chapter built the Saint Stanislaus church.

In the interwar period, it was administratively located in the Łódź Voivodeship of Poland. According to the 1921 census, the population was 96.0% Polish and 4.0% Jewish.

Following the joint German-Soviet invasion of Poland, which started World War II in September 1939, Rzgów was occupied by Germany until 1945. In July 1940, the occupiers carried out expulsions of Poles, who were deported to a transit camp in Łódź and then to the Lublin District in the more-eastern part of German-occupied Poland, while their houses were handed over to German colonists as part of the Lebensraum policy.

On January 1, 2006, it became a town again.

== Demographics ==
Historical population

Year	Pop.	±%
1827	997	—
1862	1,559	+56.4%
1890	2,171	+39.3%
1910	2,091	−3.7%

Year	Pop.	±%
1921	1,808	−13.5%
2010	3,359	+85.8%
2020	3,382	+0.7%

== Climate ==
Rzgów has a humid continental climate (Cfb in the Köppen climate classification).

Climate data for Rzgów
Month	Jan	Feb	Mar	Apr	May	Jun	Jul	Aug	Sep	Oct	Nov	Dec	Year
Mean daily maximum °C (°F)	0.3 (32.5)	2.1 (35.8)	6.9 (44.4)	13.6 (56.5)	18.5 (65.3)	21.7 (71.1)	23.7 (74.7)	23.5 (74.3)	18.6 (65.5)	12.7 (54.9)	7.2 (45.0)	2.4 (36.3)	12.6 (54.7)
Daily mean °C (°F)	−2.0 (28.4)	−0.8 (30.6)	3.0 (37.4)	8.9 (48.0)	14.0 (57.2)	17.5 (63.5)	19.5 (67.1)	19.1 (66.4)	14.5 (58.1)	9.3 (48.7)	4.7 (40.5)	0.4 (32.7)	9.0 (48.2)
Mean daily minimum °C (°F)	−4.5 (23.9)	−3.9 (25.0)	−1.0 (30.2)	3.8 (38.8)	8.9 (48.0)	12.5 (54.5)	14.8 (58.6)	14.5 (58.1)	10.4 (50.7)	6.1 (43.0)	2.3 (36.1)	−1.7 (28.9)	5.2 (41.3)
Average precipitation mm (inches)	48 (1.9)	44 (1.7)	52 (2.0)	51 (2.0)	74 (2.9)	72 (2.8)	96 (3.8)	66 (2.6)	62 (2.4)	48 (1.9)	48 (1.9)	51 (2.0)	712 (27.9)
Source: https://en.climate-data.org/europe/poland/łodz-voivodeship/rzgow-10376/
