= Kalino, Russia =

Kalino (Russian: Калино) is the name of several inhabited localities in Russia.

Urban localities

- Kalino, Chusovoy, Perm Krai, a work settlement under the administrative jurisdiction of the city of krai significance of Chusovoy, Perm Krai

Rural localities

- Kalino, Arkhangelsk Oblast, a village in Moseyevsky Selsoviet of Mezensky District of Arkhangelsk Oblast
- Kalino, Osinsky District, Perm Krai, a village in Osinsky District, Perm Krai
- Kalino, Yaroslavl Oblast, a village in Borisoglebsky Rural Okrug of Tutayevsky District of Yaroslavl Oblast
