= Gmina Rzgów, Łódź Voivodeship =

Gmina Rzgów Rzgów Commune
- Gmina

- Flag Coat of arms
- Interactive map of Gmina Rzgów
- Coordinates (Rzgów): 51°39′44″N 19°27′35″E
- Country: Poland
- Voivodeship: Łódź
- County: Łódź East County
- Seat: Rzgów

Area
  - Total: 65.97 km^{2} (25.47 sq mi)

Population (2006)
  - Total: 9,019
  - Density: 136.7/km^{2} (354.1/sq mi)
  - Urban: 3,338
  - Rural: 5,681
- Website: www.rzgow.pl/index.php

Gmina Rzgów is an urban-rural gmina (administrative district) in Łódź East County, Łódź Voivodeship, in central Poland. Its seat is the town of Rzgów, which lies approximately 14 kilometres (9 mi) south of the regional capital Łódź.

The gmina covers an area of 65.97 square kilometres (25.5 sq mi), and as of 2006 its total population is 9,019 (out of which the population of Rzgów amounts to 3,338, and the population of the rural part of the gmina is 5,681).

== Villages ==
Apart from the town of Rzgów, Gmina Rzgów contains the villages and settlements of:

- Babichy
- Bronisin Dworski
- Czyżeminek
- Gospodarz
- Grodzisko
- Guzew
- Huta Wiskicka
- Kalinko
- Kalino
- Konstantyna
- Prawda
- Romanów
- Stara Gadka
- Starowa Góra
- Tadzin

== Neighbouring gminas ==
Gmina Rzgów is bordered by the city of Łódź and by the gminas of Brójce, Ksawerów, Pabianice and Tuszyn.
