= Posadas =

Posadas may refer to:

== Places ==
- Posadas, Misiones, the capital city of the Province of Misiones, Argentina
- Posadas, Spain, a municipality in Córdoba Province, Spain

== People ==
- Alberto Posadas (born 1967), Spanish composer
- Alejandro Posadas (1870–1902), Argentinian physician and surgeon
- Carlos Posadas (1874–1918), musician
- Carmen Posadas (born 1953), prize-winning Uruguayan-Spanish author of books for children
- Gervasio Antonio de Posadas (1757–1833), member of Argentina's Second triumvirate
- Guillermo Posadas (1886–1937), Mexican composer
- J. Posadas or Homero Rómulo Cristalli Frasnelli (1912–1981), Argentine Trotskyist and Ufologist
- Juan Jesús Posadas Ocampo (1926-1993), Mexican catholic archbishop and cardinal
- Manuel G. Posadas (1841–1897), Afro-Argentine musician, journalist and Argentine soldier
- Manuel Posadas (1860–1916), Afro-Argentine musician
- Marcos Leonel Posadas (born 1938), Mexican politician
- Miguel Posadas (1711–1753), Spanish painter
- Daniel Ruiz Posadas (born 1995), Spanish volleyball player

== Other uses ==
- Grupo Posadas, a Mexican hotel company
- Las Posadas, a Latin American celebration during the nine days preceding Christmas
- Posadas de Puerto Rico Associates v. Tourism Company of Puerto Rico, a landmark United States Supreme Court Case addressing freedom of commercial speech

== See also ==
- Posada (disambiguation)
