= Lesne =

Lesne may refer to:

- Gérard Lesne (born 1956), French singer
- Sylvain Lesné (fl. 2022), neuroscientist
- Pierre Lesne (1871–1949), French entomologist

== See also ==
- Lesné, village in Slovakia
- Leśne (disambiguation), a group of places in Poland
