= Posada =

Posada may refer to:

- Battle of Posada, a 1330 battle, part of the Hungarian-Wallachian Wars

== Places ==
=== In Poland ===
- Posada, Lower Silesian Voivodeship, south-west Poland
- Posada, Łódź Voivodeship, central Poland
- Posada, Masovian Voivodeship, east-central Poland
- Posada, Gmina Kazimierz Biskupi in Greater Poland Voivodeship, west-central Poland
- Posada, Gmina Stare Miasto in Greater Poland Voivodeship, west-central Poland
- Posada, Gmina Wierzbinek in Greater Poland Voivodeship, west-central Poland
- Posada, Słupca County in Greater Poland Voivodeship, west-central Poland

=== In other countries ===
- Posada, Sardinia, Italy
- Posada, a village administered by Comarnic town, Prahova County, Romania
- Posada, Asturias, a parish in Llanes, Asturias, Spain

== People with the surname Posada ==
- José Guadalupe Posada (1852–1913), Mexican engraver and illustrator
- Luis Posada Carriles (1928–2018), Cuban-born Venezuelan anti-communist militant
- José Posada (1940–2013), Spanish member of the European Parliament
- Jorge Posada (born 1971), Puerto Rican baseball player, who played for the New York Yankees
- Saira Posada (born 1998), Spanish woman's footballer

== See also ==
- La Posada de Albuquerque, a building in Albuquerque, New Mexico
- San Giovanni di Posada, Sardinia, Italy
- Posad, a settlement in the Russian Empire, often surrounded by ramparts and a moat, adjoining a town, kremlin or monastery
- Posadas (disambiguation)
