= Kotliny =

Kotliny may refer to the following places:

- Kotliny, Łódź East County in Łódź Voivodeship (central Poland)
- Kotliny, Zduńska Wola County in Łódź Voivodeship (central Poland)
- Kotliny, Lublin Voivodeship (east Poland)
