= Bukowiec, Łódź East County =

Bukowiec
- Village
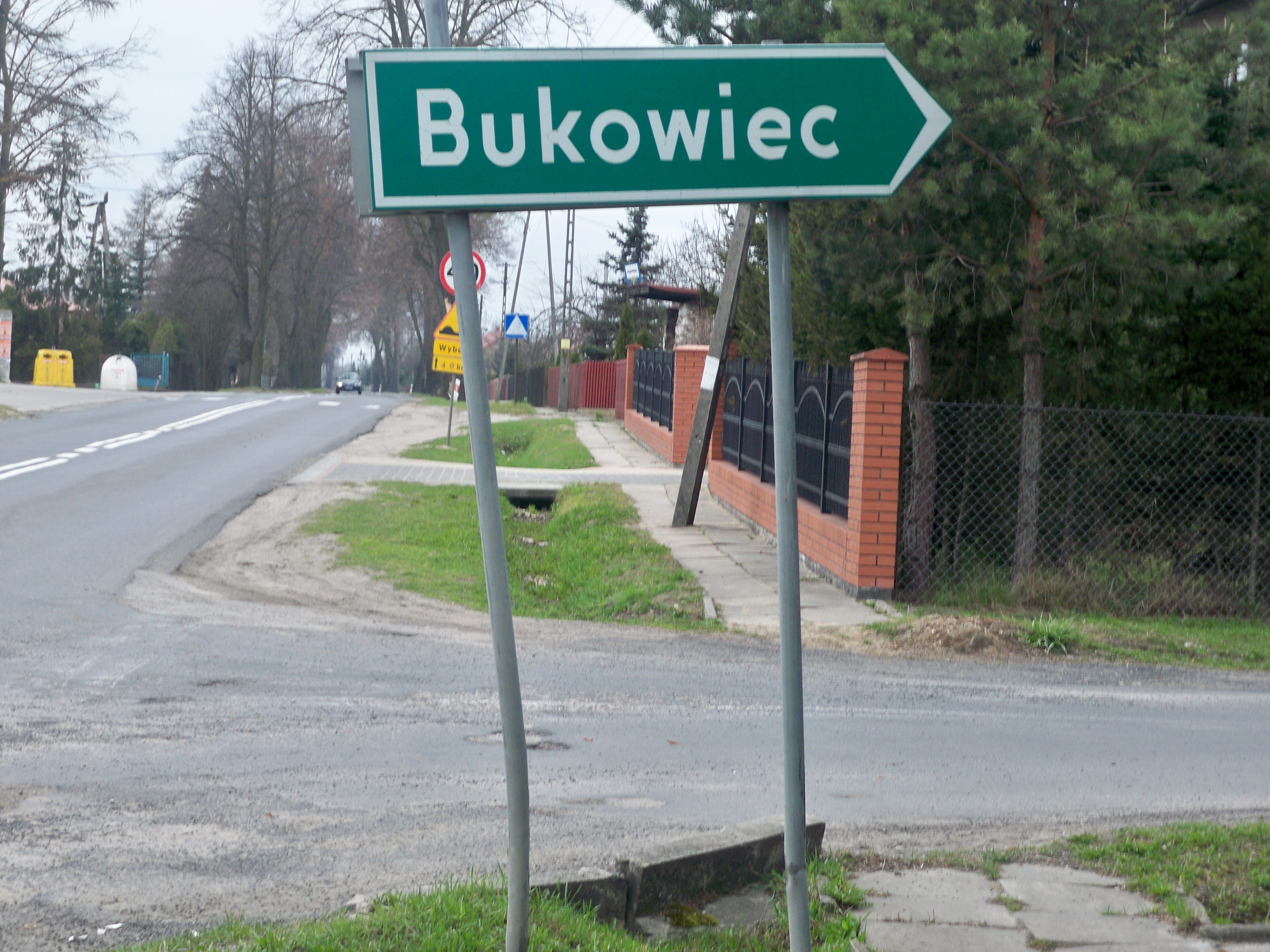

- Location within Poland
- Coordinates: 51°41′N 19°40′E
- Country: Poland
- Voivodeship: Łódź
- County: Łódź East
- Gmina: Brójce
- Population: 1,000

Bukowiec [buˈkɔvjɛt͡s] is a village in the administrative district of Gmina Brójce, within Łódź East County, Łódź Voivodeship, in central Poland. The village lies approximately 3 km (2 mi) north-east of Brójce and 18 km (11 mi) south-east of the regional capital Łódź.
