= Brójce =

Brójce may refer to:

- Brójce, Łódź Voivodeship, Poland
- Brójce, Lubusz Voivodeship, Poland
