= Budy Wandalińskie =

- Village
- Location within Poland
- Coordinates: 51°41′48″N 19°33′55″E
- Country: Poland
- Voivodeship: Łódź
- County: Łódź East
- Gmina: Brójce
- Population: 180

Budy Wandalińskie [ˈbudɨ vandaˈliɲskʲɛ] is a village in the administrative district of Gmina Brójce, within Łódź East County, Łódź Voivodeship, in central Poland.
