= Stefanów, Gmina Brójce =

Stefanów
- Village
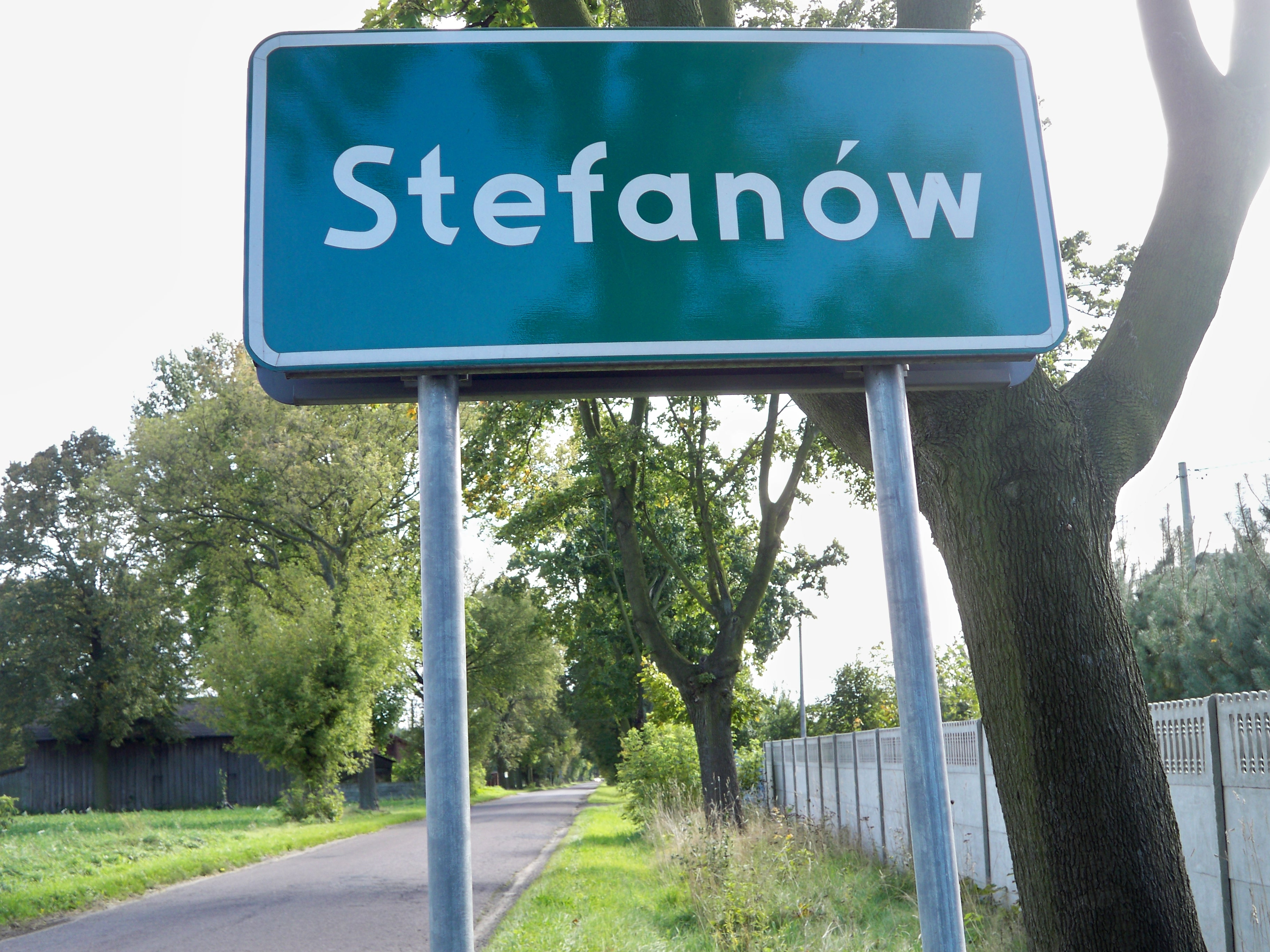

- Location within Poland
- Coordinates: 51°41′30″N 19°33′34″E
- Country: Poland
- Voivodeship: Łódź
- County: Łódź East
- Gmina: Brójce

Stefanów [stɛˈfanuf] is a village in the administrative district of Gmina Brójce, within Łódź East County, Łódź Voivodeship, in central Poland.
