= Giemzów =

- Village
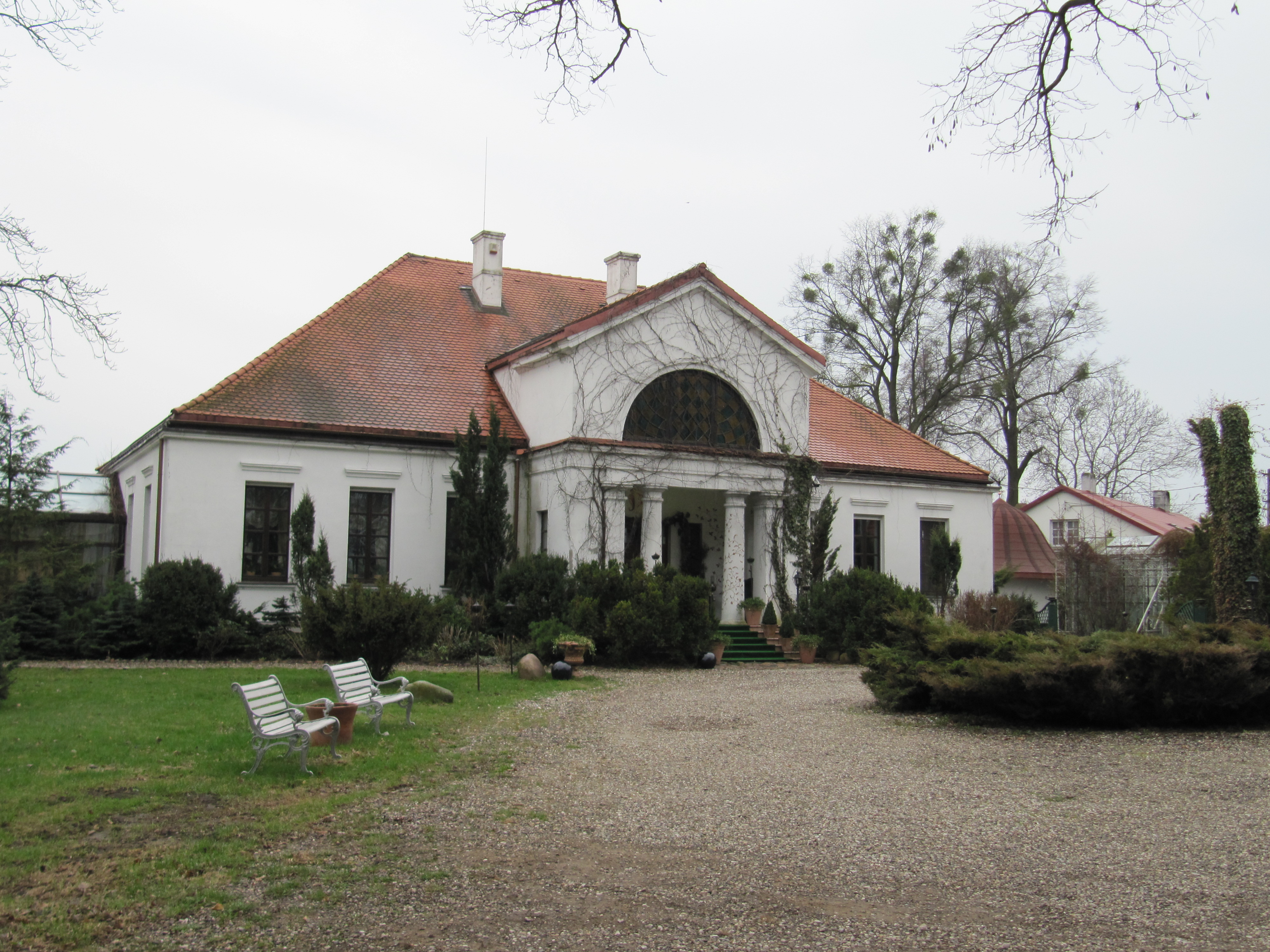
- Manor

- Location within Poland
- Coordinates: 51°42′N 19°36′E
- Country: Poland
- Voivodeship: Łódź
- County: Łódź East
- Gmina: Brójce

Giemzów [ˈɡʲɛmzuf] is a village in the administrative district of Gmina Brójce, within Łódź East County, Łódź Voivodeship, in central Poland.
