= Manuel Posadas =

Argentine musician (1860-1916)

Manuel L. Posadas
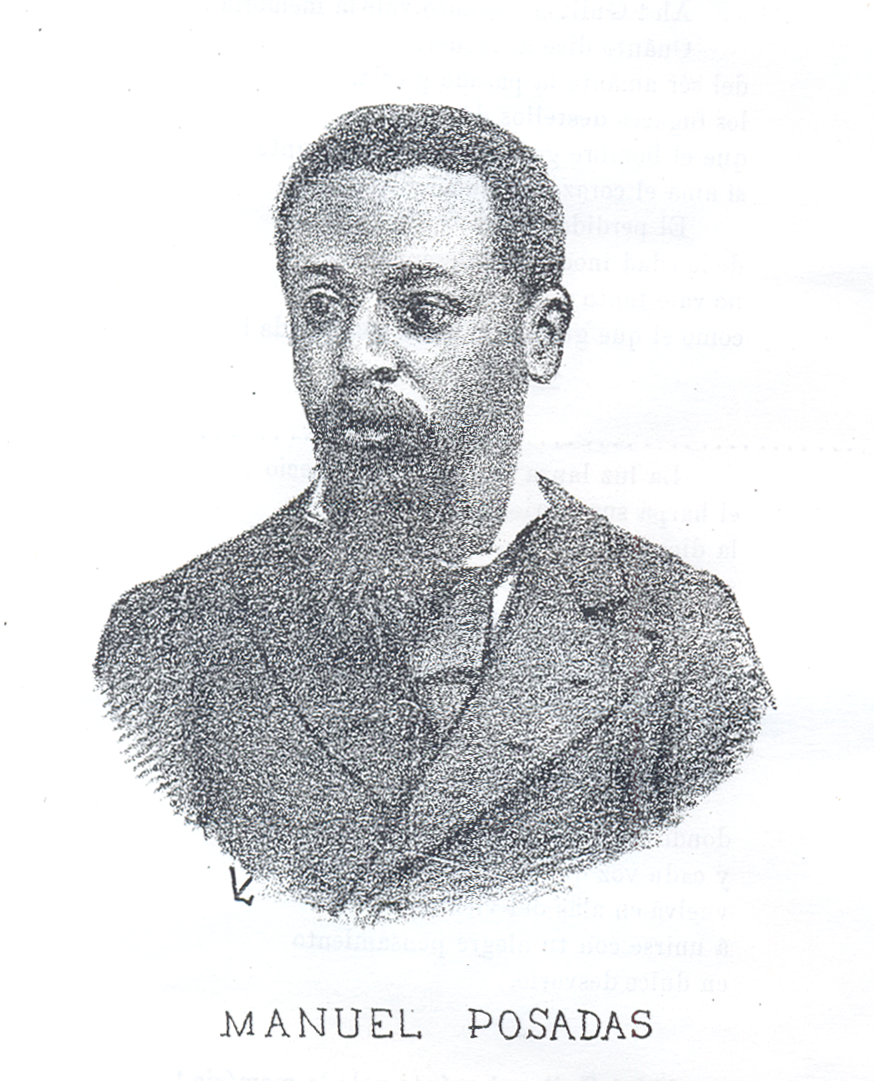
- Posadas, portrayed in 1880
- Born: 1860; Buenos Aires, State of Buenos Aires
- Died: 1916 (aged 55–56); Argentina
- Citizenship: State of Buenos Aires (until 1961); Argentina (from 1961)
- Occupation: Musician

Manuel L. Posadas (1860-1916) was an Argentine musician. He was a leading exponent of the Afro-Argentine music from the late nineteenth and early twentieth century.

== Biography ==
Manuel L. Posadas was born in Buenos Aires in 1860, the son of a musician, journalist and soldier Manuel G. Posadas and Emilia Smith. He was Afro-Argentine by both of his parents and his mother was partially of Scottish origin. He was the brother of Carlos Posadas, who also excelled in the local industry. He showed talent for music, studying in the School of Music of the province of Buenos Aires in 1875, being a disciple of Pedro Ripari.

In 1879 he traveled to Belgium to improve his studies, entering the Royal Conservatory of Brussels where he studied under some of the great European masters of the era, including the violin and Belgian composer Eugene Ysaye. He performed as a violinist at the Teatro Real of the galleries there and in 1882 he returned to Buenos Aires offering on arrival a concert at the Coliseum Theatre on 9 September of that year.

He returned to Brussels for a while, but finally settled back in his native city, devoting himself to teaching music. He became first violin of the Teatro Colón and taught at the National Institute for the Blind. Among his students were the teacher Juan José Castro (1895—1968), a leading composer and conductor.

He also directed some of the bands that inspired the dance of Carnival in the city: the daily La Tribune in its edition of February 11, 1903 reported that "The Argentine Politeama dances presented at the next innovation that will surely be received with satisfaction by the item dancer. The company has paid particular attention to organize an orchestra of 40 full professors in Argentina, under the direction of maestro Manuel Posadas."

He died in Buenos Aires in 1916.
