= Wygoda, Łódź East County =

Wygoda
- Village
- Location within Poland
- Coordinates: 51°41′15″N 19°39′02″E
- Country: Poland
- Voivodeship: Łódź
- County: Łódź East
- Gmina: Brójce

Wygoda [vɨˈɡɔda] is a village in the administrative district of Gmina Brójce, within Łódź East County, Łódź Voivodeship, in central Poland.
