= Wola Rakowa =

- Village
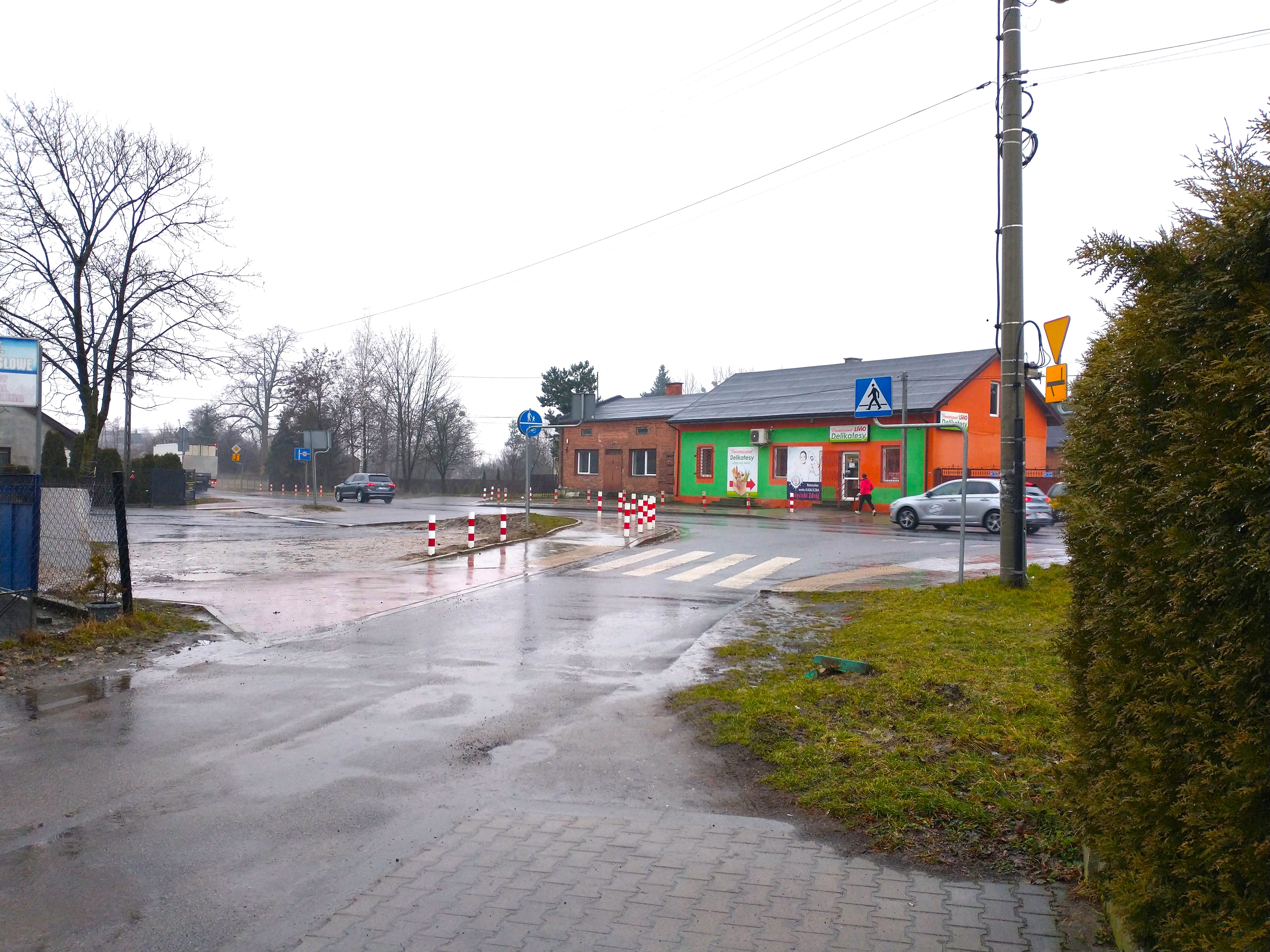

- Location within Poland
- Coordinates: 51°41′N 19°36′E
- Country: Poland
- Voivodeship: Łódź
- County: Łódź East
- Gmina: Brójce
- Population: 590

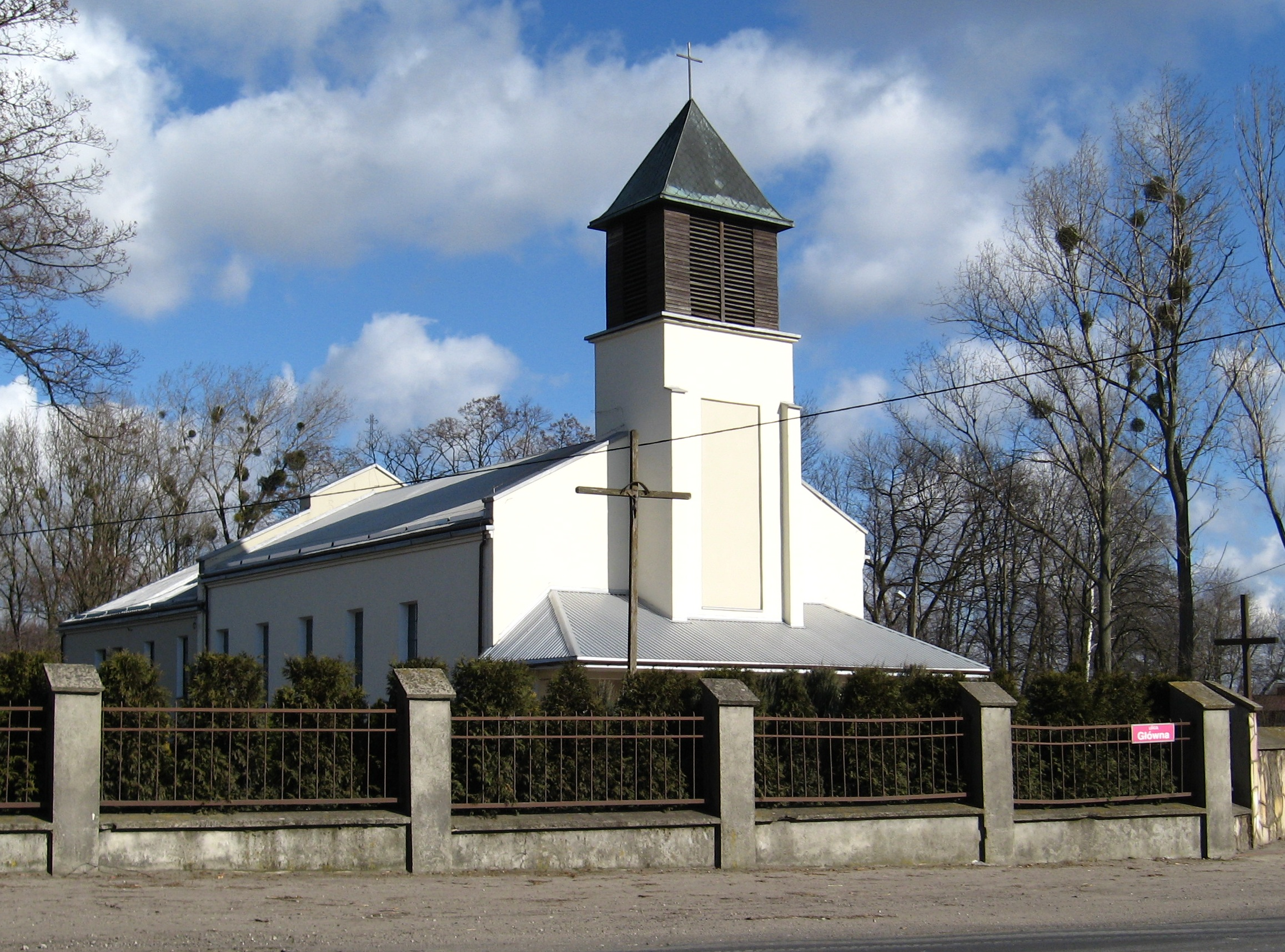
Church in Wola Rakowa

Wola Rakowa [ˈvɔla raˈkɔva] is a village in the administrative district of Gmina Brójce, within Łódź East County, Łódź Voivodeship, in central Poland.
