= Przypusta =

- Village
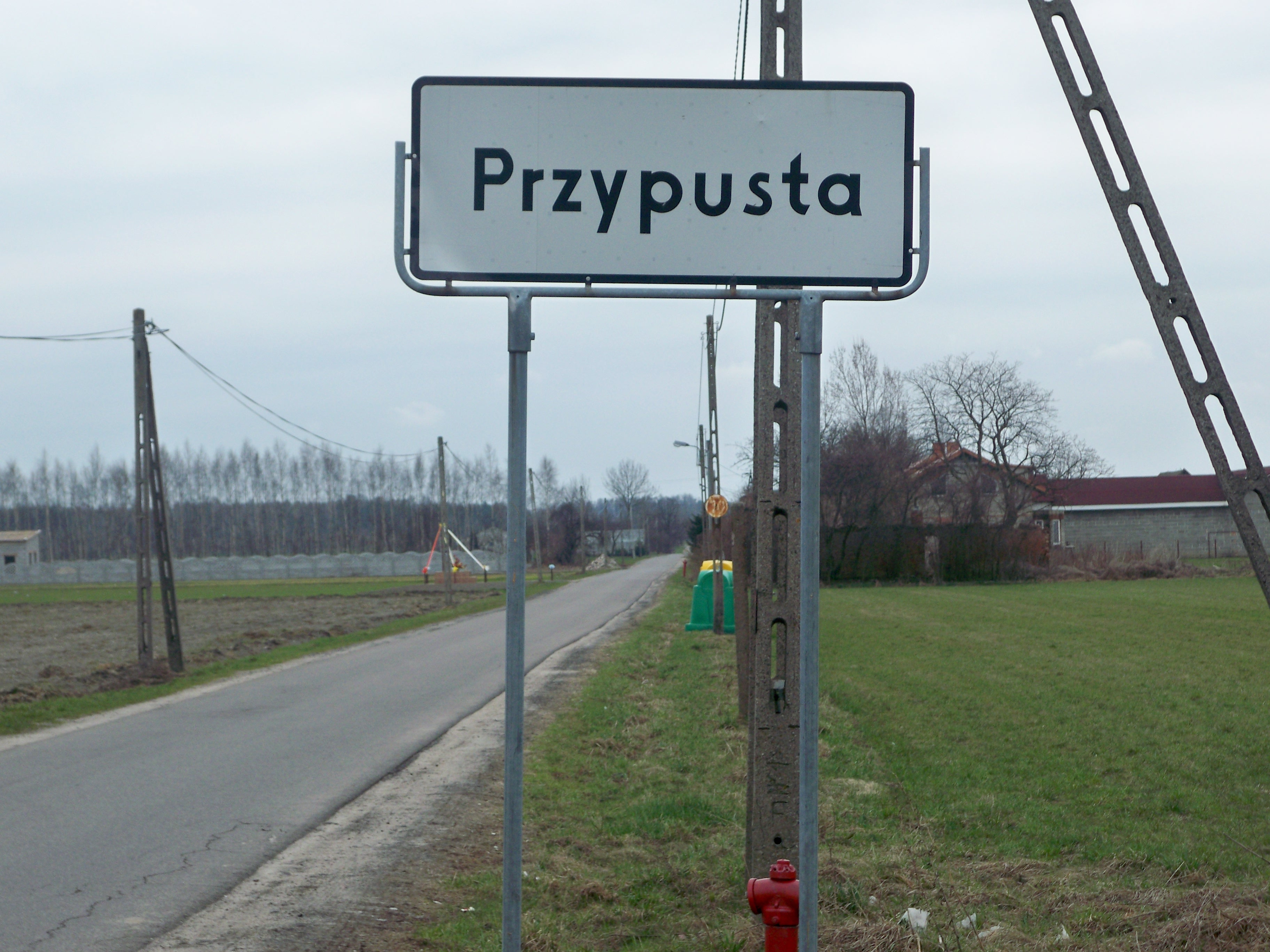

- Location within Poland
- Coordinates: 51°41′N 19°35′E
- Country: Poland
- Voivodeship: Łódź
- County: Łódź East
- Gmina: Brójce

Przypusta [pʂɨˈpusta] is a village in the administrative district of Gmina Brójce, within Łódź East County, Łódź Voivodeship, in central Poland.
