= Leśne =

Leśne may refer to the following places, all in Poland:

- Leśne Chałupy
- Leśne Domki
- Leśne Odpadki
- Leśne Pólko
- Leśne Śliwki
