= Gmina Brójce =

Gmina Brójce Brójce Commune
- Gmina
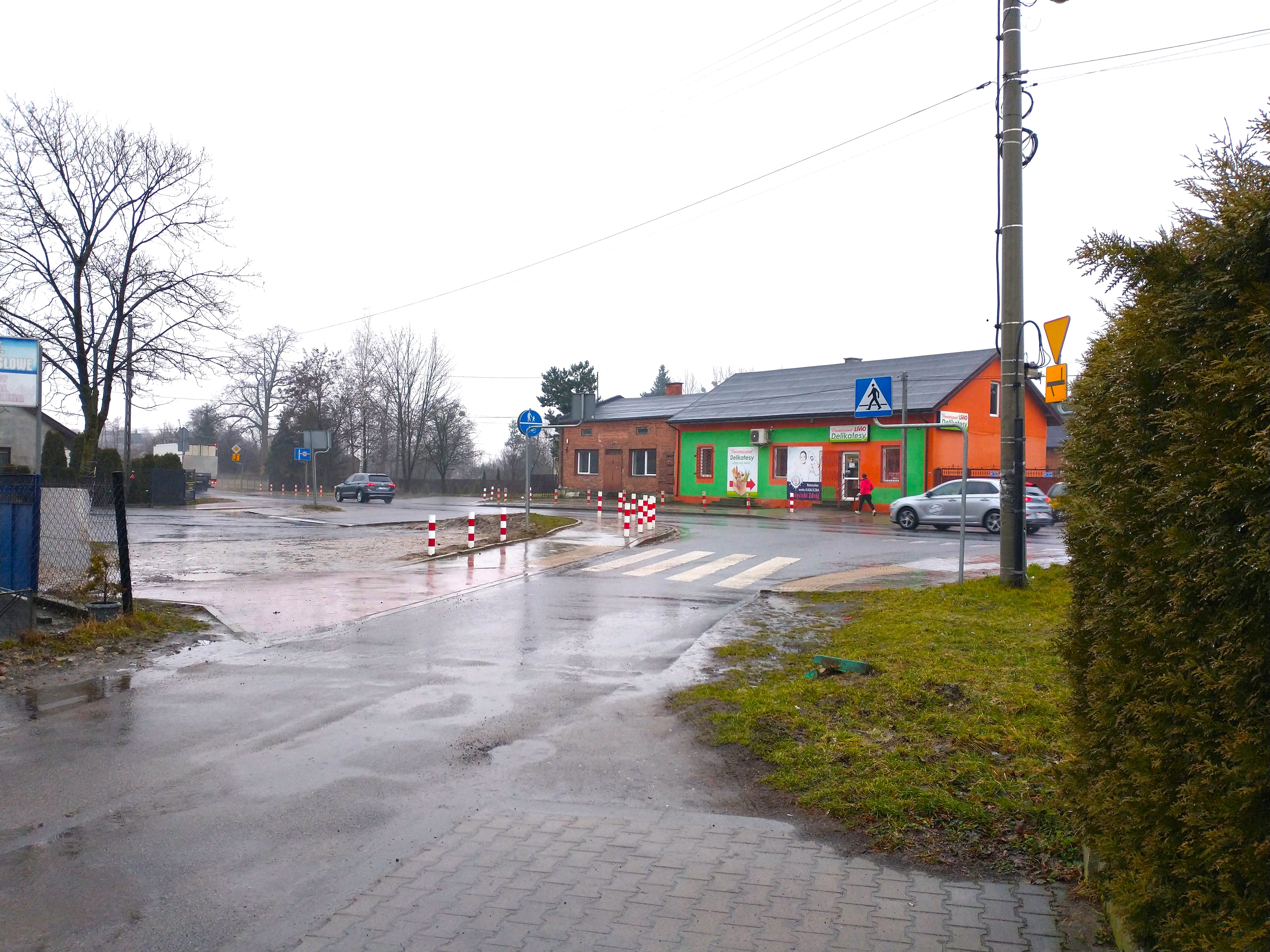

- Coat of arms
- Interactive map of Gmina Brójce
- Coordinates (Brójce): 51°40′4″N 19°38′7″E
- Country: Poland
- Voivodeship: Łódź
- County: Łódź East County
- Seat: Brójce

Area
  - Total: 69.55 km^{2} (26.85 sq mi)

Population (2006)
  - Total: 5,399
  - Density: 77.63/km^{2} (201.1/sq mi)
- Website: www.brojce.pl

Gmina Brójce is a rural gmina (administrative district) in Łódź East County, Łódź Voivodeship, in central Poland. Its seat is the village of Brójce, which lies approximately 18 kilometres (11 mi) south-east of the regional capital Łódź.

The gmina covers an area of 69.55 square kilometres (26.9 sq mi), and as of 2006 its total population is 5,399.

== Villages ==
Gmina Brójce contains the villages and settlements of:

- Brójce
- Budy Wandalińskie
- Bukowiec
- Giemzów
- Giemzówek
- Karpin
- Kotliny
- Kurowice
- Leśne Odpadki
- Pałczew
- Posada
- Przypusta
- Stefanów
- Wardzyn
- Wola Rakowa
- Wygoda

== Neighbouring gminas ==
Gmina Brójce is bordered by the city of Łódź and by the gminas of Andrespol, Będków, Czarnocin, Koluszki, Rokiciny, Rzgów and Tuszyn.
