= Kotliny, Łódź East County =

Kotliny
- Villa
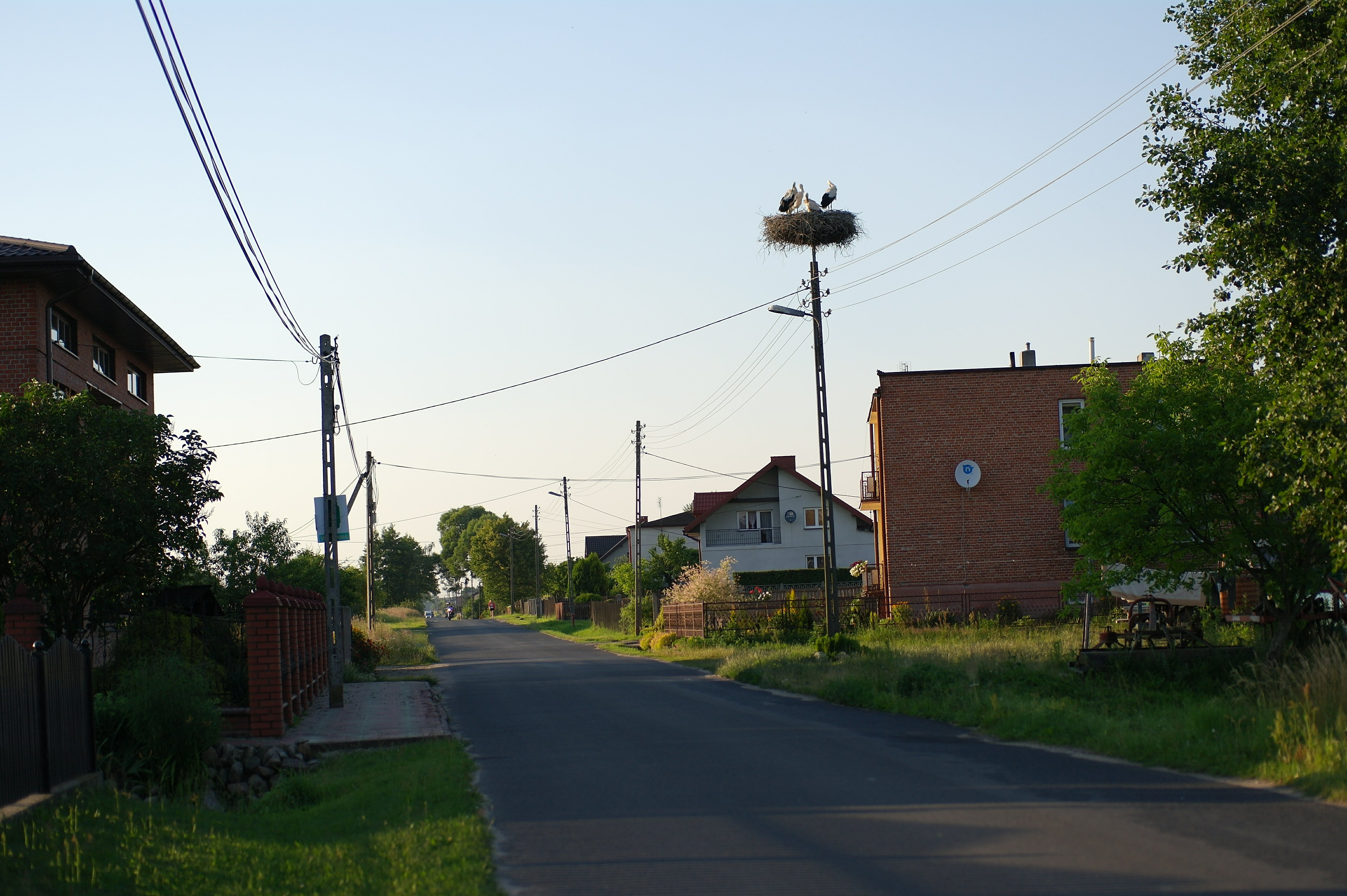

- Location within Poland
- Coordinates: 51°39′34″N 19°42′46″E
- Country: Poland
- Voivodeship: Łódź
- County: Łódź East
- Gmina: Brójce

Kotliny [kɔˈtlinɨ] is a village in the administrative district of Gmina Brójce, within Łódź East County, Łódź Voivodeship, in central Poland.
