= Guillermo Posadas =

Mexican composer (1886–1937)

Guillermo Posadas (1886–1937) was a Mexican composer. He composed the Mexican folk song "Noche Feliz" ("Happy Night"), recorded by the Italian tenor Enrico Caruso and sung in Spanish. The song "Noche Feliz" describes a night with Posadas's wife María, and love with his soul. Posadas was also a musical arranger and assistant director of an orquesta típica in New York, who worked with Mexican singer Carmen Garcia Cornejo, and composer Miguel Lerdo de Tejada.
