= Carlos Posadas =

Argentinian musician, 1874–1918

- Born: 2 December 1874; Buenos Aires, Argentina
- Died: 11 December 1918 (aged 44); Buenos Aires, Argentina

Carlos Posadas (1874–1918) was a musician dedicated to Argentine tango in the 19th century.

== Biography ==
Carlos Posadas was born in Buenos Aires on 2 December 1874, son of a musician, journalist and soldier Manuel G. Posadas and Emily Smith. He was the brother of Manuel Posadas, who also excelled in the local musical scene and was his first violin teacher, which he carried out with a strong academic training.

Mercedes Sumiza married and had several children: Manuel Carlos (who was a jazz musician), Luis María, Emilia, Haydée, Delia, Adela and Julia. They lived in a house at 280 Talcahuano Street.

While his greatest contribution to music was as a composer, Carlos Posadas joined orchestral groupings devoted to operetta and zarzuela at various times in his short career as a violinist, including Penella's orchestra performing in the Teatro Avenida in 1917.

As a performer he led some tango orchestras, playing the violin or the piano, for carnival dances and on some other stages in the city. As a guitarist, an instrument on which he was a distinguished performer, he performed at the Opera at the famous company of Madame Berthe Rassimi.

Together the brothers Juan José Castro (1895–1968), a leading composer and conductor, and José María Castro, Posadas played frequently in religious services. Juan Jose Castro, who also had been a pupil of his brother Manuel, dedicated to him the tango ¡Qué Titeo!

He also appeared in a trio with Ennio Bolognini (cello) and Pizzapia (piano) in the first movie theaters in the city.

The "Black Posadas" was with other black performers such as Alejandro Vilela, Tiburcio Silbarrio, Rosendo Mendizábal, Harold Phillips and Juan Santa Cruz, one of the regular performers that enlivened so-called "dance schools" and "city cafes", specifically from the dance schools of La Morocha Laura Montserrat and "lo de Hansen".

He was a teacher of many musicians and instrumentalists, including the renowned concert pianist Maria Luisa Anido. Carlos Posadas maintained friendships with renowned tango musicians of the era, such as Juan Bergamino (1875–1959), godfather to his son, Charles, whom he had met in Argentina Guitar Association, violinist Ernesto "El Rengo" Zambonini (with whom he used to meet in the café Marathon, of Costa Rica and Canning) and Juan "Pacho" Maglio (with whom he used to meet in Garibotto of Pueyrredón y San Luis, where his friend was playing around 1910).

With the benefit of academic training, it was often Posadas who translated to a musical notation many of the compositions of his friends, as in the case of Bergamino and sometimes even Maglio.

As a composer he is considered one of the most original authors in the history of tango as a precursor to the current "evolutionary" aesthetic line that later would follow famous performers such as Agustín Bardi, Jose Martínez, Roberto Firpo, Juan de Dios Filiberto and Horacio Salgán.

Few of his compositions remain in the records of the National Library, just a few scores and a few recordings exist. Other names are known by references to his contemporaries. Some of his works are: Tangos edited by J A Medina and Sons:

- Toto (dedicated to his nephew A. Valdez Jr.)
- El Taita
- El Calote
- La Llorona (dedicated to Aida Campos)
- Igualá y Largá
- Si me quierés decime
- El Gringo (dedicated to John Bergamino)
- El Talero

Later Tangos:

- Cordón de Oro (dedicated to his disciple and friend Alberto Cattaneo)
- Don Héctor (dedicated to Hector Rodriguez)
- El Biguá (dedicated to Luis and Pedro Zabalía)
- El Chacarero (dedicated to his friend Juan B. Martinez)
- Guanaco (dedicated to Honorio Valdez)
- Jagüel (dedicated to his friend Teodoro Argerich)
- El Tamango (dedicated to his friend Carlos Garibotto)
- Timido (dedicated to jockey Francisco Liceri)
- El Ventilador (dedicated to Richard Galup Lanús)
- Enriquito (dedicated to his friend Enrique Piñeiro Klappenbach)
- Fatal Herida
- Indio Muerto
- The Tacuarita (dedicated to his friend Carlos La Rosa)
- Pituca
- El Retirao (dedicated to his friend Argentino Tarantino)
- Teodora (dedicated to his friend Teodora Teodoro Argerich, son)
- A Reculié (dedicated to student and friend Alfredo M. Ferré)
- Marta (dedicated to Alberto Caprile)
- El Flaco (dedicated to his disciple and "best friend" Bernardo Bulando)
- Mi Doctor
- Mi Porota (dedicated to his daughter Harriet Haydee)
- Mi Ricurita
- Qué Parada
- Tené Paciencia
- El Simpático (dedicated to "likeable songwriter" Agustín Jaurigue).
- Catita (dedicated to Aristobulus J. Delfino)

Other tangos were never published, among them Pacho Quartet, Nicucho, La Pera de Cesáreo, Cuartelera, El Protegido, and Mi Compadre. He also wrote at least one mazurka, Mi Compadre, and a waltz, Pitita. In an interview years later by his son Carlos Leon Benarós, he confirmed that some of his father's unpublished songs had been released to Anibal Troilo.

Four of his tangos stand out: Retirao, recorded by Carlos Di Sarli with his orchestra on 11 December 1939 and then by Troilo 10 July 1957. Jagüel, recorded by Troilo in 1941, by Di Sarli in 1943, 1952 and 1956 and Juan D'Arienzo in 1967, Cordón de Oro (Troilo in 1941 and D'Arienzo in 1967) and El Tamango (Troilo in 1941 and D'Arienzo in 1967).

He died in Buenos Aires on 12 November 1918, still young, as a result of cerebrovascular disorders. At his death he was living in No.215 Emerald Street, Buenos Aires
