= Manuel G. Posadas =

Argentine musician (1841–1897)

- Born: October 18, 1841; Buenos Aires, Argentine Confederation
- Died: March 13, 1897 (aged 55); Buenos Aires, Argentina
- Citizenship: Argentine Confederation (until 1852); State of Buenos Aires (1852–1861); Argentina (from 1861)

Manuel G. Posadas (18 October 1841 – 13 March 1897) was an Argentine musician, journalist and soldier in the nineteenth century.

== Biography ==
Manuel G. Posadas was born in Buenos Aires, Argentine Confederation, on 18 October 1841. He was Afro-Argentine. He displayed an aptitude for music, and studied under the instruction of Professor Silveira.

He married Emily Smith, of Scottish and Afro-Argentine origin from Buenos Aires, and they had at least three children: Carlos, Manuel and Luis Maria. The first two children were dedicated to music, a subject in which they excelled, and would go on to study more intensively both in Buenos Aires and around the world.

In 1865 he joined the Argentine Army as a volunteer to fight in the War of the Triple Alliance. He was assigned to the 2nd Battalion of the 3rd. regiment commanded by Colonel José María Morales. Posadas rose quickly to the rank of sergeant but due to illness, he had to abandon the campaign and return to Buenos Aires.

As a strong supporter of General Bartolomé Mitre, Posadas was appointed captain of National Guards. He participated in the Revolution of 1874 and after the defeat of the liberal party, he continued teaching music and writing in diverse media outlets in the city including El Eco Artistic and La Nación.

He again re-enlisted to the military, being assigned to the Sosa battalion commanded by Colonel Morales. He took an active part in the revolution of 1880 and in the fighting on Monday, June 21 at Puente Alsina and Corrales (the current location of Parque Patricios). He also participated in the 1890 revolution which, despite being defeated, caused the renunciation of President Miguel Juárez Celman.

As a violinist he performed in several theaters in Columbus and Opera. He died in Buenos Aires on March 13 of 1897.
