= Posada, Łódź Voivodeship =

Posada
- Village
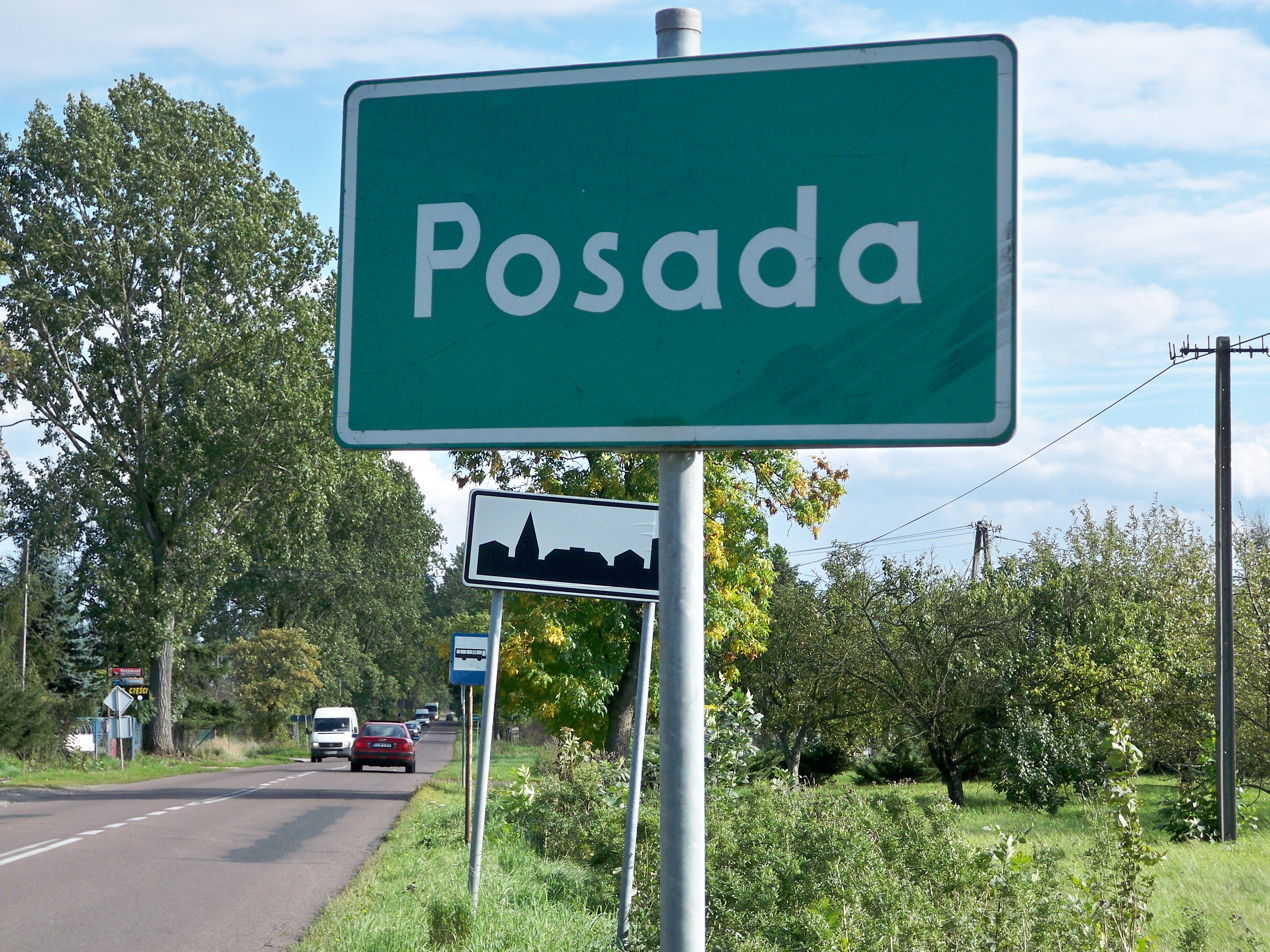
- Street of Posada, Łódź Voivodeship

- Location within Poland
- Coordinates: 51°41′46″N 19°33′58″E
- Country: Poland
- Voivodeship: Łódź
- County: Łódź East
- Gmina: Brójce
- Population: 40

Posada [pɔˈsada] is a village in the administrative district of Gmina Brójce, within Łódź East County, Łódź Voivodeship, in central Poland.
