= Juan José Castro =

Argentine musician

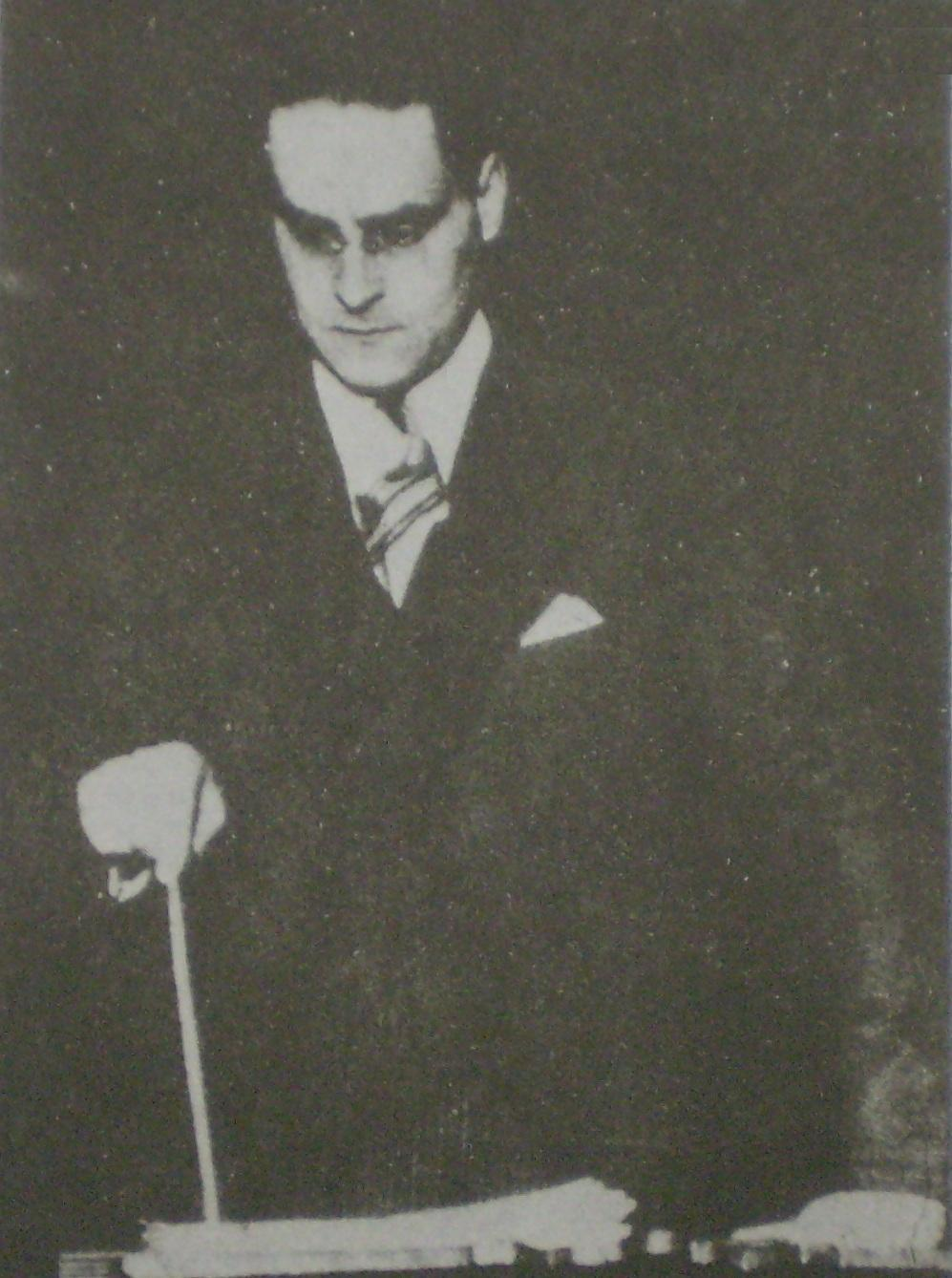
Composer Juan José Castro

Juan José Castro (March 7, 1895 – September 3, 1968) was an Argentine composer and conductor.

Born in Avellaneda, Castro studied piano and violin under Manuel Posadas and composition under Eduardo Fornarini, in Buenos Aires. In the 1920s he was awarded the Europa Prize, and then went on to study in Paris at the Schola Cantorum under Vincent d'Indy and Édouard Risler. Returning to Buenos Aires in 1925, he was named conductor of the Renacimiento Chamber Orchestra in 1928 and the Teatro Colón in 1930. From 1939 to 1943 he was a professor at the Buenos Aires Conservatory.

Castro's international career began in the 1940s. In 1947 he conducted the Havana Philharmonic, and the Sodre Orchestra in Uruguay in 1949. In 1952-53 he was the conductor of the Melbourne Symphony Orchestra (then known as the Victorian Symphony Orchestra) in Australia. He returned to the Americas and conducted the National Symphony in Buenos Aires from 1956-1960. From 1960 to 1964, he was director of the Conservatory of Music of Puerto Rico.

His output encompasses works for opera, ballet, incidental music for theater and film, as well as orchestral pieces—alone, with soloists and/or choir—chamber ensembles, songs, and scores for solo instruments—piano, bandoneon.

He was awarded the Konex Honorary Award in 1989 in recognition of his career and contribution to classical music in Argentine history. He was appointed a full member of the National Academy of Fine Arts.

Castro's brothers, José María and Washington Castro, were also both composers. Juan José Castro married the daughter of the composer Julián Aguirre. He died in Buenos Aires in 1968, aged 73.

== Works ==
Note: This list is incomplete

- Violin Sonata, 1914
- Cello Sonata, 1916
- Piano Sonata No. 1, 1917
- A una madre, 1925
- Symphony No. 1, 1931
- Biblical Symphony, 1932
- Mekhano, ballet, 1934
- Sinfonia Argentina, 1934
- Symphony No. 3, 1936
- Symphony No. 4, 1939
- Piano Sonata No. 2, 1939
- Offenbachiana, ballet, 1940
- Piano Concerto, 1941
- String Quartet, 1942
- La zapatera prodigosa opera after Federico García Lorca, 1943
- Martin Fierro, cantata, 1944
- El Llanto de las Sierras, 1947
- Corales Criollos No. 1 & 2, piano, 1947
- Proserpina y el extranjero (Proserpina and the Foreigner), opera after Omar del Carlo, 1951
- Bodas de sangre (Marriage of Blood), opera after Lorca, 1952
- Corales Criollos No. 3, orchestra, 1953
- Symphony No. 5, 1956
- Epitafio en ritmos y sonidos, chorus and orchestra, 1961
- Suite introspectiva, orchestra, 1962
