= Leśne Odpadki =

- Village
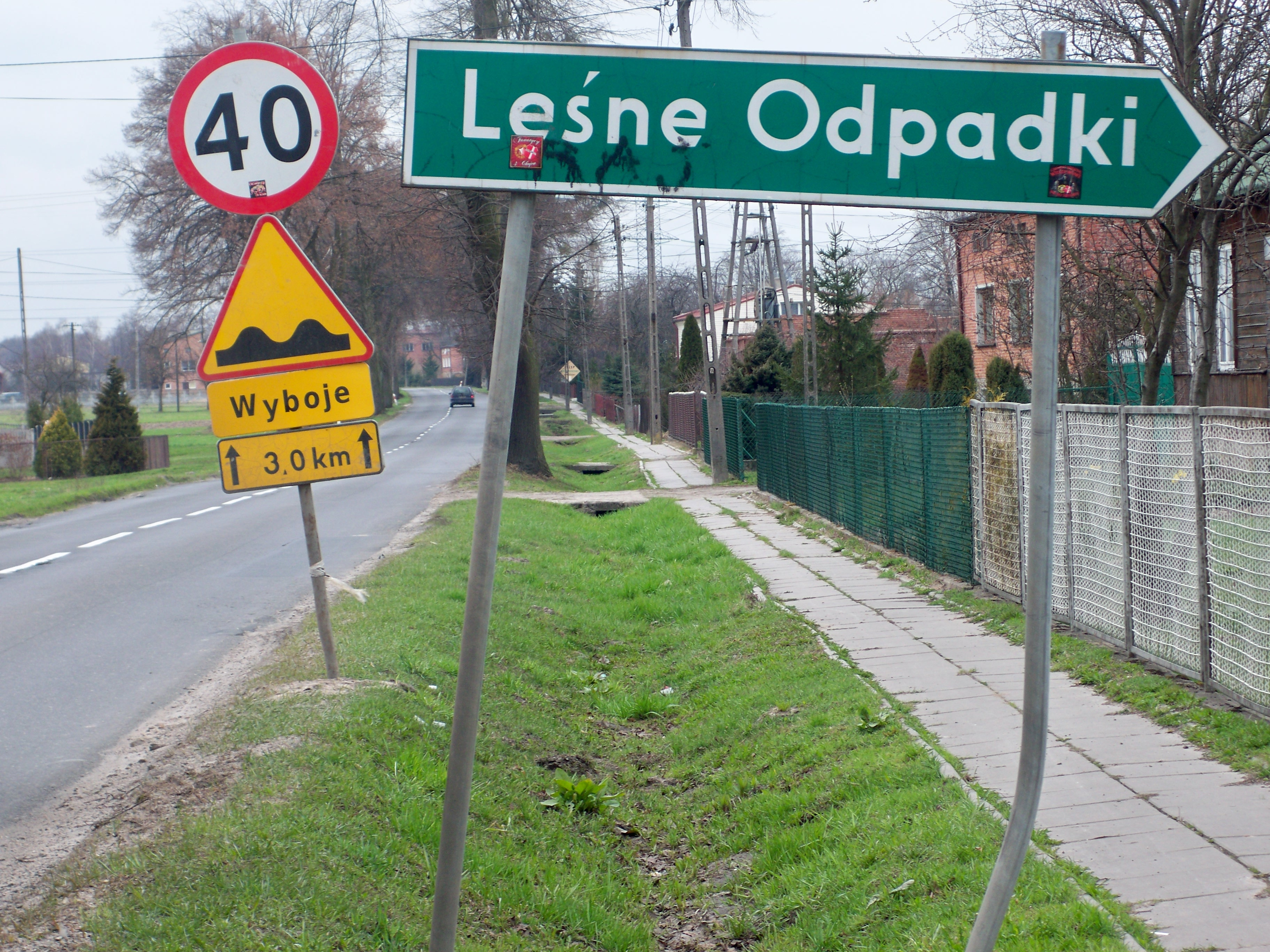
- Road sign in Leśne Odpadki

- Location within Poland
- Coordinates: 51°40′39.54″N 19°38′40.31″E
- Country: Poland
- Voivodeship: Łódź
- County: Łódź East
- Gmina: Brójce

Leśne Odpadki [ˈlɛɕnɛ ɔtˈpatki] is a village in the administrative district of Gmina Brójce, within Łódź East County, Łódź Voivodeship, in central Poland.
