= Brójce, Łódź Voivodeship =

Brójce
- Village
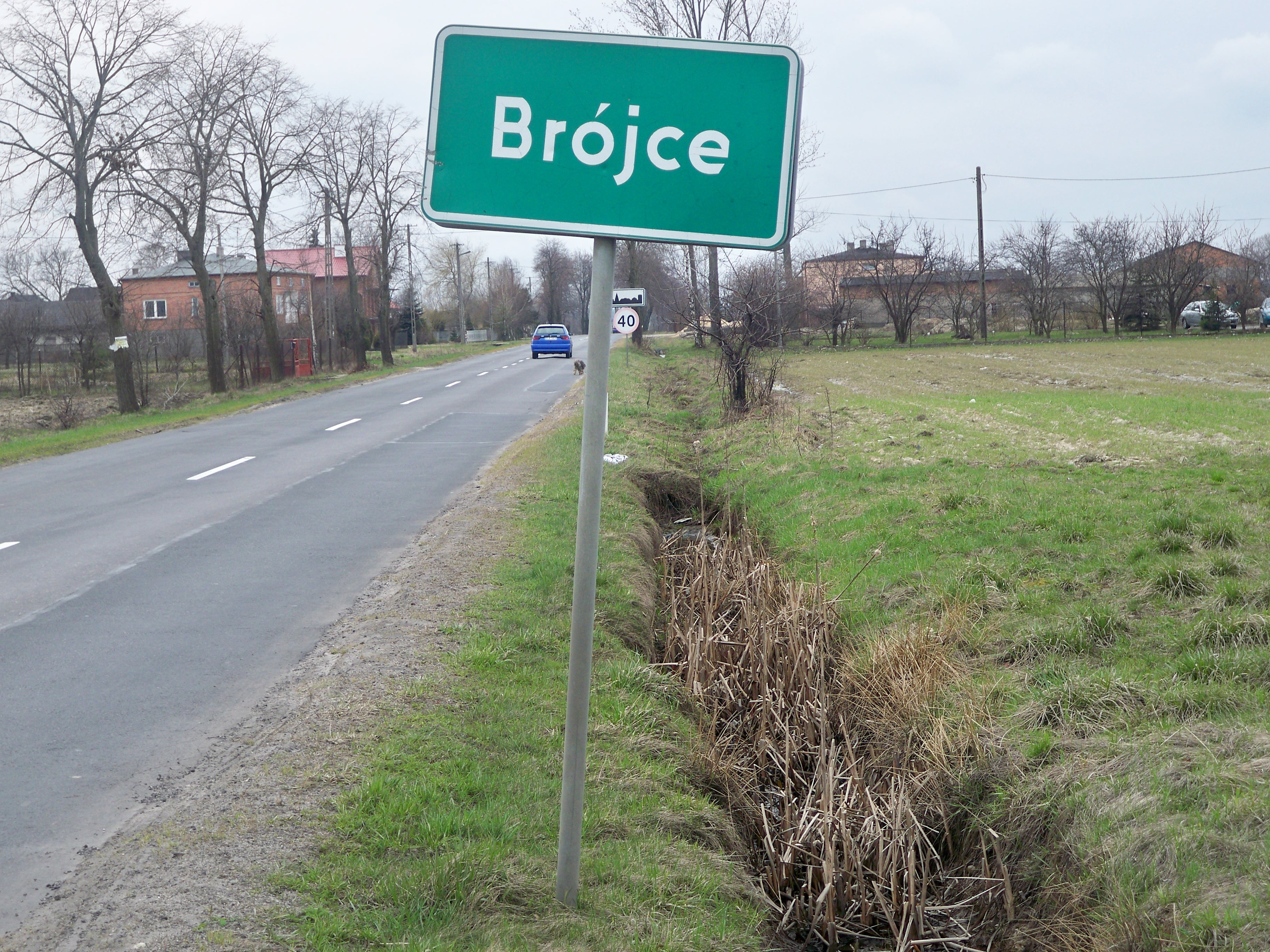

- Location within Poland
- Coordinates: 51°40′4″N 19°38′7″E
- Country: Poland
- Voivodeship: Łódź
- County: Łódź East
- Gmina: Brójce
- Population: 385

Brójce [ˈbrui̯t͡sɛ] is a village in Łódź East County, Łódź Voivodeship, in central Poland. It is the seat of the gmina (administrative district) called Gmina Brójce.
