= Gajewniki-Kolonia =

- Village
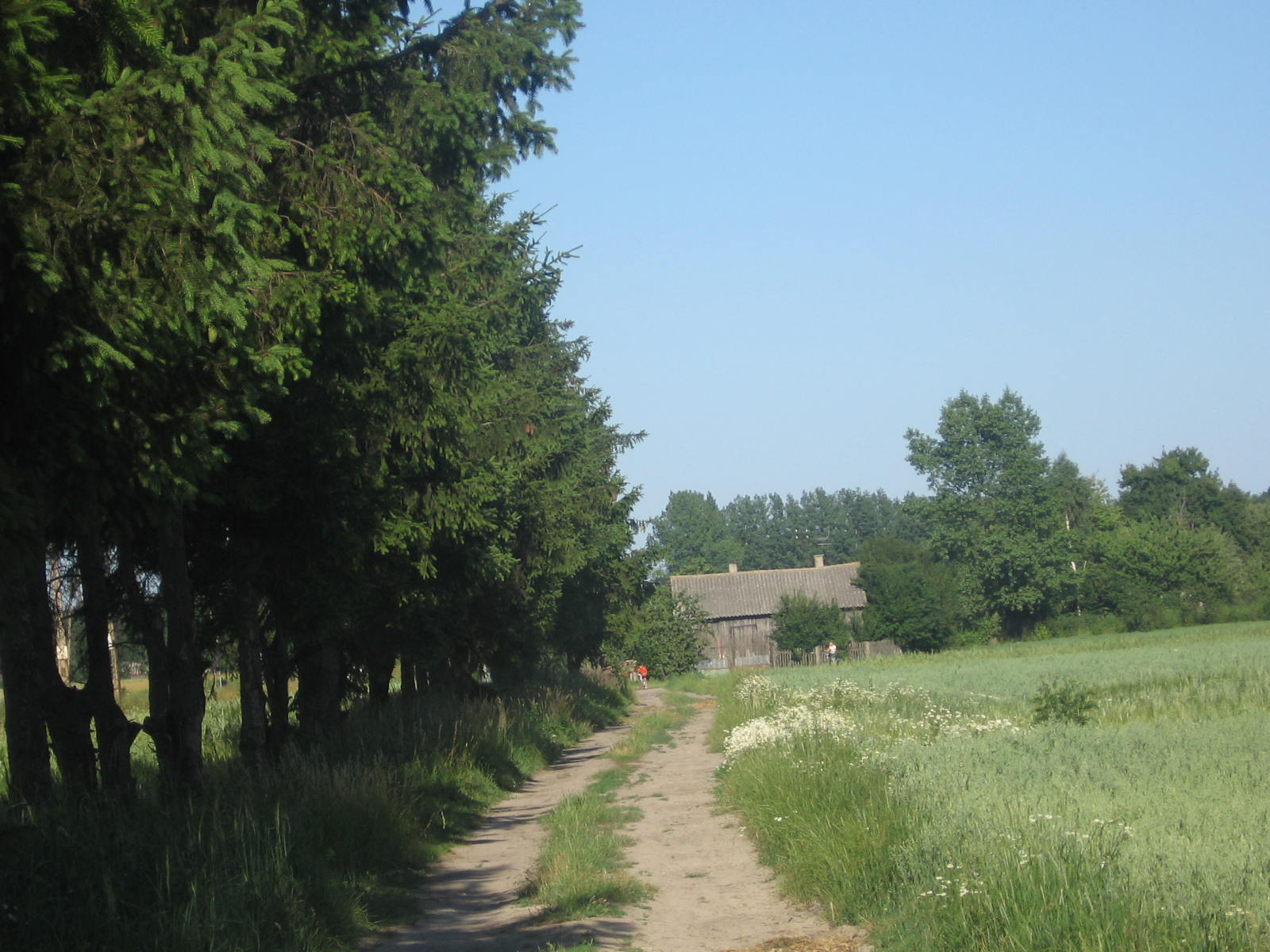

- Location within Poland
- Coordinates: 51°36′N 19°1′E
- Country: Poland
- Voivodeship: Łódź
- County: Zduńska Wola
- Gmina: Zduńska Wola

Government
  - Sołtys: Krystyna Smażek
- Population (approx.): 160
- Postal code: 98-220
- Area code: +48 43

Gajewniki-Kolonia (Polish pronunciation: [ɡajevˈɲikʲi kɔˈlɔɲʲa]) is a village in the administrative district of Gmina Zduńska Wola, within Zduńska Wola County, Łódź Voivodeship, in central Poland. It is close to the village of Gajewniki. From 1975 to 1998, Gajewniki-Kolonia was a part of Sieradz Voivodship.
