= Nadezhda Ziber-Shumova =

Russian biochemist (1856–1916)

Nadezhda Olimpievna Ziber-Shumova
- Born: 19 May 1856; Rostov, Yaroslavl Governorate, Russian Empire
- Died: 11 May 1916 (aged 59); Saint Petersburg, Russian Empire
- Education: University of Bern
- Spouse: Nikolai Ziber
- Scientific career
- Fields: Chemistry

Nadezhda Olimpievna Shumova later Ziber-Shumova (Russian: Надежда Олимпиевна Зибер-Шумова; 7 May [19 May] 1856 – 11 May 1916) was the first woman professor of biochemistry in the Russian Empire, who made a significant contribution to the formation and development of this science.

== Biography ==
She was born on 7 May 1856 in Rostov. Her father was Olimpiy Alekseevich Shumov, and her mother was Alexandra Mikhailovna Shumova. The family had 8 children, and Nadezhda was the youngest. Later, she and her family moved to St. Petersburg where she spent her childhood and adolescence. After she successfully graduated from the Mariinskaya Women's Gymnasium, she entered the Vladimir Higher Women's Courses with a university style teaching to get a medical education. There she attended lectures of famous professors, such as Dmitri Mendeleev, Alexander Butlerov, and Andrei Famintsyn.

Under the leadership of Alexander Butlerov, she was engaged in qualitative and quantitative analysis in a private chemical laboratory course, after which she successfully passed the exams in courses of inorganic and organic chemistry.

Nadezhda aspired to get a higher medical education, but in Russia, this was impossible for women and, as a result, she went to Europe. At first she studied at the Faculty of Philosophy at the Heidelberg University, where she studied physics and chemistry. Then she moved to Paris, where women were allowed to study in natural science and medical subjects. In the College de France, Nadezhda was attending lectures on anatomy and practicing medicine. A few years later, her sister, Ekaterina, joined her and entered the Medical Faculty.

In 1874, Nadezhda returned to Russia and married Nikolai Ziber, at that time an assistant professor of the Department of Political Economy and Statistics at St. Vladimir University in Kyiv. Also, he was one of the first advocates of Marxism in Russia. In 1875, after Nikolai Ziber retired, they moved to Switzerland, where Nadezhda continued to study medicine at the University of Bern. During her studying at the university, Ziber-Shumova already had some scientific publications. The university also had a research group led by Marceli Nencki, which Nadezhda joined in 1877.In 1880, she received her Doctor of Medicine degree that was based on a thesis titled 'Contributions to knowledge on yeasts' from the University of Bern.

After her graduation, she worked for 4 years in the laboratory of Nencki, and, in 1884, Nadezhda was chosen to be an assistant in physiological chemistry at the University of Bern. She was the first woman at this university who got a full-time research position. During her work with Nencki, Ziber-Shumova wrote a total of 30 scientific papers in chemistry and biochemistry.

The most important work on which Nadezhda and Marceli worked together was related to the structure of hemin - a blood protein. Their research was based on a series of results on the decomposition of hemin into products carried out by Nencki's group over the years. This work was one of the first on this topic.

They also developed a "biochemical test", which helps to evaluate the intensity of oxidative processes by measuring the amount of oxidized benzene in the body of an animal. This test made it possible to take into account the oxidative potential of the body. Nencki applied it to the study of a number of diseases and found that with leukemia, with phosphorus poisoning, and under the influence of drugs the oxidative capacity of the body sharply decreases, and with diabetes, the intensity of oxidative processes does not change. These studies showed that, the localization of metabolic disorders must be sought at the very first stages of the conversion of the carbohydrate molecule.

Moreover, they developed a method for the detection of urobilin in urine, based on the identification of a specific absorption band during spectrophotometry of urine, to which sulfuric acid has been added. This method is called the "Nencki-Ziber test". They also suggested a method for producing oxyketones from fatty acids and phenols.

In 1888, Nikolai Ziber died, and Nadezhda devoted all her time to science. She worked at the University of Bern until 1891, although in 1890, she and Nencki received an invitation to work in the newly created the Department of Chemistry of the Imperial Institute of Experimental Medicine (now the Institute of Experimental Medicine). She also came to St. Petersburg at July 21- August 2, 1890, apparently, for negotiations with Duke Alexander of Oldenburg about the possibility of future work in the Institute of Experimental Medicine.

In the summer of 1891, the invitation was accepted, and Marceli Nencki and his co-workers arrived in St. Petersburg. After a 16 years, 35-year-old Nadezhda returned to Russia with the extensive European education, research experience and authoritative scientific publications in the field of a new science related to physiology and chemistry - physiological chemistry, later called biochemistry. The Department of Chemistry under the leadership of Marceli Nencki began work on 2 July 1891. Ziber-Shumova sent a request to Alexander III for employment at the Imperial Institute of Experimental Medicine. On 13 September 1891 she was admitted to the post of the assistant of the head of the department.

In 1892, Nadezhda Olimpievna and Marceli Nencki participated in planning the construction of the laboratory building and equipping it with the most modern equipment. As a result, a modern research center was created, that surpassed similar European scientific departments and laboratories of that time. Together with a team of like-minded people, Nencki and Ziber-Shumova launched scientific research in physiological chemistry, designed to maintain links between medicine and biology.

In the 1890s, during the period of numerous epidemics, efforts were made in Russia to organize a health care system and sanitary control. In 1892, Nentsky and Ziber-Shumova participated in the research of the cholera epidemic. They also took a part in the search for easily available antiseptics, where they studied properties of pine resin. In April 1895, she was awarded a bonus of 1000 rubles for her work on the development of diphtheria vaccine at the Imperial Institute of Experimental Medicine. Later, in 1895 and 1898, Nadezhda Ziber-Shumova took a part in expeditions to the Caucasus, the purpose of which was fighting against rinderpest - an infectious viral disease of cattle.

After the death of Nentsky in 1901, Ziber-Shumova was temporarily assigned to the position of the head of the Department of Chemistry, and on 1 December 1909 she became the permanent head of the Department of Chemistry at the Imperial Institute of Experimental Medicine.

In 1906 she founded, together with Professor Nikolay Simanovsky, a female gymnasium in the village Zorka, Novgorod Governorate. This educational institution was founded in memory of her sister, Dr. Ekaterina Shumova-Simanovskaya. She also awarded scholarships to students including peasant girls, children of nobles, and girls from big cities. In addition, in the same village, she equipped a hospital with a laboratory.

In 1912, she became the first woman to receive all rights of a full member of the Imperial Institute of Experimental Medicine (contrary to the rule that existed in the institute, which did not provide for the assignment of such a title to women). In recognition of outstanding scientific work, Ziber-Shumova was awarded the title of professor. Thus, she became the first female professor of biochemistry and the official head of the research department.

After the outbreak of the World War I, Nadezhda focused her efforts on an organization for an infirmary for wounded soldiers.

In 1915, Nadezhda was diagnosed with a severe malignant blood disease. She died on 11 May 1916 and was buried at the Tikhvin Cemetery of the Alexander Nevsky Lavra in St. Petersburg.

== Scientific Legacy ==
Her works, including those written in collaboration with Nencki, discuss the chemical composition of various pigments of animal tissues, blood pigments and their derivatives, oxidases and other enzymes, the biology of fermentation and decay, the chemical composition of bacteria, toxins and antitoxins, the pathogenicity of microorganisms, etc. Articles that had been written before 1901 were included in the posthumous collection of works of Nencki, prepared and published by Ziber-Shumova - Marceli Nencki Opera omnia (Braunschweig, 1904); other works were published in "Zeitschrift für Physiologische Chemie" and " Russian Physician ".

In addition to her scientific activity, Ziber-Shumova did a lot for the further development of science with the help of funds inherited from her uncle. In 1907, she established the Nencki Prize which was annually awarded to the best researcher-intern of the Department of Chemistry. This was the first grant in the history of Russian science designed to support young researchers. In 1909, she donated 50,000 rubles to the Polish Society of Biological Research to help them found a research institution named after Marceli Nencki. She also bequeathed to the future institute part of her personal library.

Due to her academic achievements and scientific works, she is the most notable person of that time in the history of Russian Science. One of the confirmations of the importance of her contribution to science is the lifetime publication of her biography in the Brockhaus and Efron Encyclopedic Dictionary.

== See also ==
- Timeline of women in science
- Julia Lermontova
- Anna Volkova
