= Brondy =

- Village
- Location within Poland
- Coordinates: 51°44′02″N 19°00′20″E
- Country: Poland
- Voivodeship: Łódź
- County: Zduńska Wola
- Gmina: Szadek
- Postal code: 98-240

Brondy [ˈbrɔndɨ] is a village in the administrative district of Gmina Szadek, within Zduńska Wola County, Łódź Voivodeship, in central Poland.
