= Szadkowice, Zduńska Wola County =

Szadkowice
- Village
- Location within Poland
- Coordinates: 51°41′4″N 18°58′26″E
- Country: Poland
- Voivodeship: Łódź
- County: Zduńska Wola
- Gmina: Szadek
- Population: 850

Szadkowice [ʂatkɔˈvʲit͡sɛ] is a village in the administrative district of Gmina Szadek, within Zduńska Wola County, Łódź Voivodeship, in central Poland.
