= Laskowiec =

Laskowiec may refer to the following places:

- Laskowiec, Kuyavian-Pomeranian Voivodeship (north-central Poland)
- Laskowiec, Łódź Voivodeship (central Poland)
- Laskowiec, Podlaskie Voivodeship (north-east Poland)
- Laskowiec, Masovian Voivodeship (east-central Poland)
- Laskowiec, Opole Voivodeship (south-west Poland)
