= Maciejów, Zduńska Wola County =

Maciejów
- Village
- Location within Poland
- Coordinates: 51°37′02″N 18°57′23″E
- Country: Poland
- Voivodeship: Łódź
- County: Zduńska Wola
- Gmina: Zduńska Wola
- Population: 170

Maciejów [maˈt͡ɕɛjuf] is a village in the administrative district of Gmina Zduńska Wola, within Zduńska Wola County, Łódź Voivodeship, in central Poland.
