= Pratków =

- Village
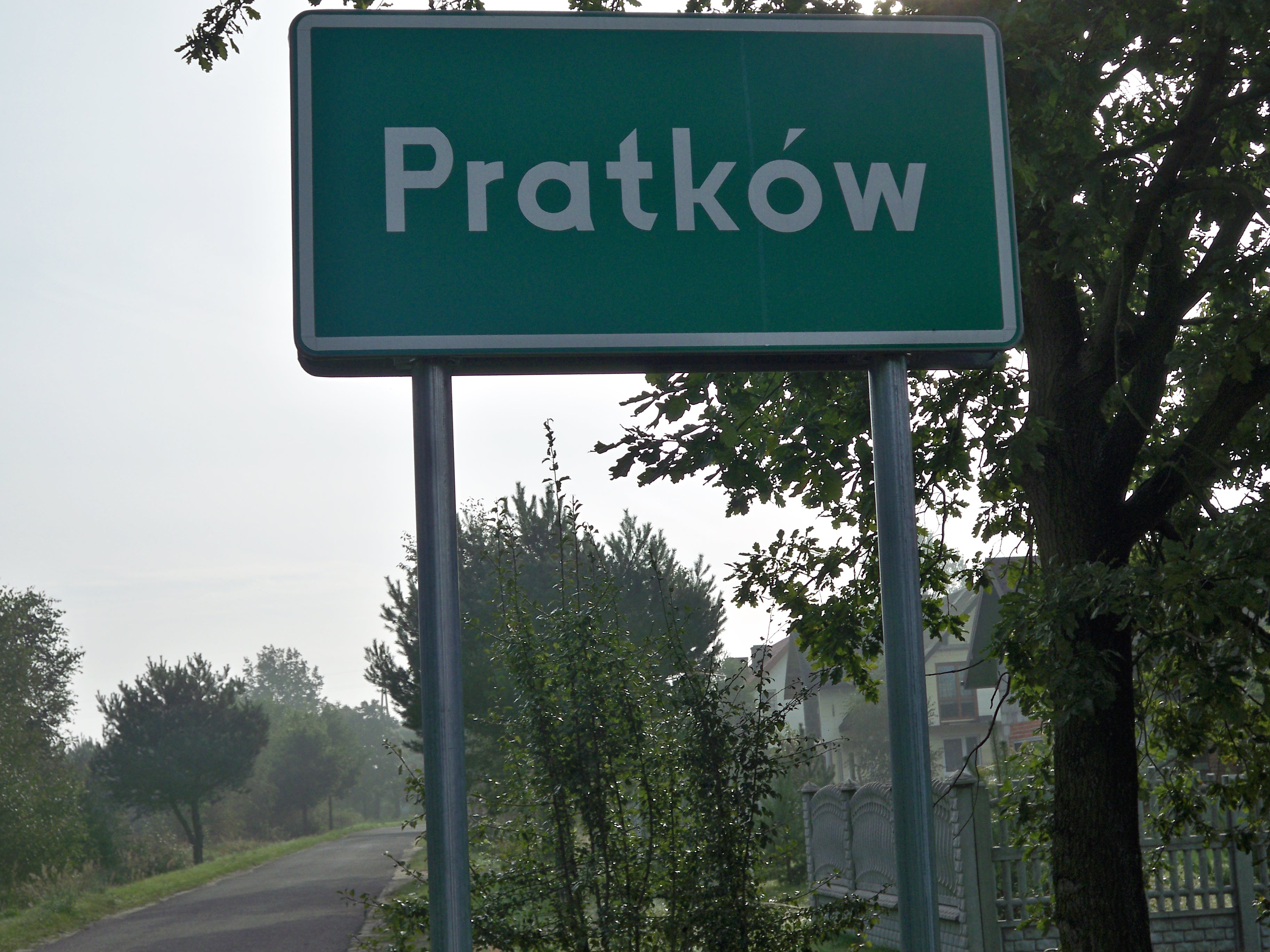

- Location within Poland
- Coordinates: 51°40′N 18°53′E
- Country: Poland
- Voivodeship: Łódź
- County: Zduńska Wola
- Gmina: Zduńska Wola

Pratków [ˈpratkuf] is a village in the administrative district of Gmina Zduńska Wola, within Zduńska Wola County, Łódź Voivodeship, in central Poland.
