= Annopole =

Annopole may refer to:

- Annopole, Gmina Środa Wielkopolska
- Annopole, Złotów County
- Annopole Stare
- Annopole Nowe
