= Jerzy Karol Kurnatowski =

Polish lawyer, academic, author and politician

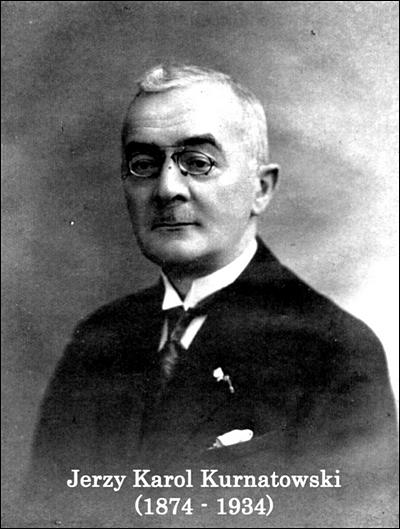
- Born: 1 July 1874; Wola Krokocka, Poland
- Died: 22 May 1934 (aged 59); Wola Krokocka, Poland
- Education: University of Warsaw
- Occupations: Lawyer, economist, academic, author, politician, public official, political scientist
- Political party: Polskie Stronnictwo Mieszczańskie
- Spouse: Jadwiga Boetticher
- Awards: Cross of Valour; Legion of Honour; Order of the White Lion.

Jerzy Karol Kurnatowski (1 July 1874 – 22 May 1934) was a Polish lawyer, economist, academic, author, politician, public official, and political scientist. He has been awarded the Cross of Valour twice, the Legion of Honour, and the Order of the White Lion.

== Early life and education ==
Jerzy Karol Kurnatowski was born on 1 July 1874 in Wola Krokocka, Poland. He was the son of Witold (1827-1907), the judge of the peace and his second wife, Eleonora née Klimaszewska. He began his legal studies in 1892 at the University of Warsaw. In 1897 he presented his thesis in the field of criminal law, entitled Duel. In 1901 he opened his own law firm in Łódź, and in 1903 he moved to Warsaw. In 1902 he married Jadwiga née Boetticher, a painter. They had no children.

== Career ==
In 1901 Kurnatowski founded a law firm in Łódź. In the years 1919-1923 he worked in the Ministry of Communications, where he was co-writing "Bandera Polska", the Ministry of Public Works, and the Central Statistical Office. In the years 1919-1934 he was professor in the School of Political Science and the Chair of the Socioeconomic History Department. Between 1929 and 1934 he worked on economic policy. He was one of the leaders of Polskie Stronnictwo Mieszczańskie, a prominent political party.
