= Izabelów Mały =

- Village
- Location within Poland
- Coordinates: 51°37′1″N 18°53′40″E
- Country: Poland
- Voivodeship: Łódź
- County: Zduńska Wola
- Gmina: Zduńska Wola
- Population: 160

Izabelów Mały [izaˈbɛluf ˈmawɨ] is a village in the administrative district of Gmina Zduńska Wola, within Zduńska Wola County, Łódź Voivodeship, in central Poland.
