= Boczki, Zduńska Wola County =

Boczki
- Village
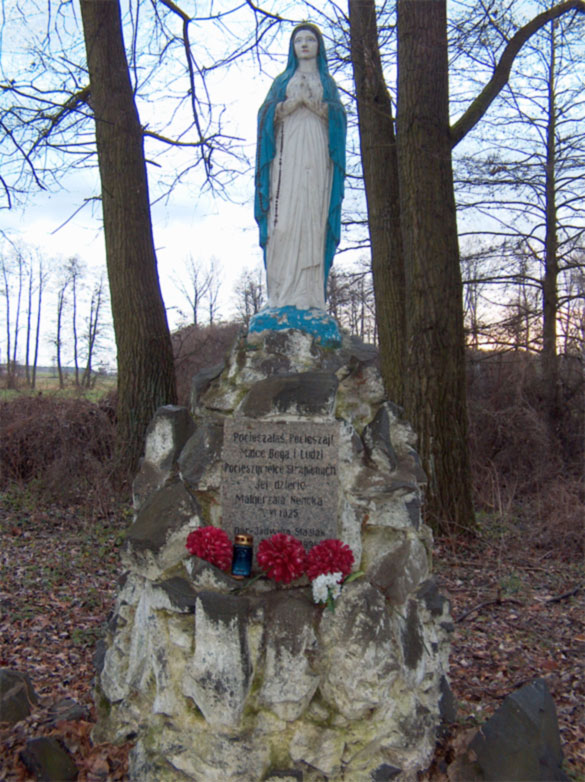

- Location within Poland
- Coordinates: 51°42′37″N 18°51′15″E
- Country: Poland
- Voivodeship: Łódź
- County: Zduńska Wola
- Gmina: Szadek

Boczki [ˈbɔt͡ʂkʲi] is a village in the administrative district of Gmina Szadek, within Zduńska Wola County, Łódź Voivodeship, in central Poland.

== Notable residents ==
- Wilhelm Marceli Nencki (1847–1901), chemist and doctor
