= Prusinowice, Zduńska Wola County =

Prusinowice
- Village
- Location within Poland
- Coordinates: 51°43′40″N 18°54′56″E
- Country: Poland
- Voivodeship: Łódź
- County: Zduńska Wola
- Gmina: Szadek

Prusinowice [pruɕinɔˈvʲit͡sɛ] is a village in the administrative district of Gmina Szadek, within Zduńska Wola County, Łódź Voivodeship, in central Poland.
