= Dionizów =

- Village
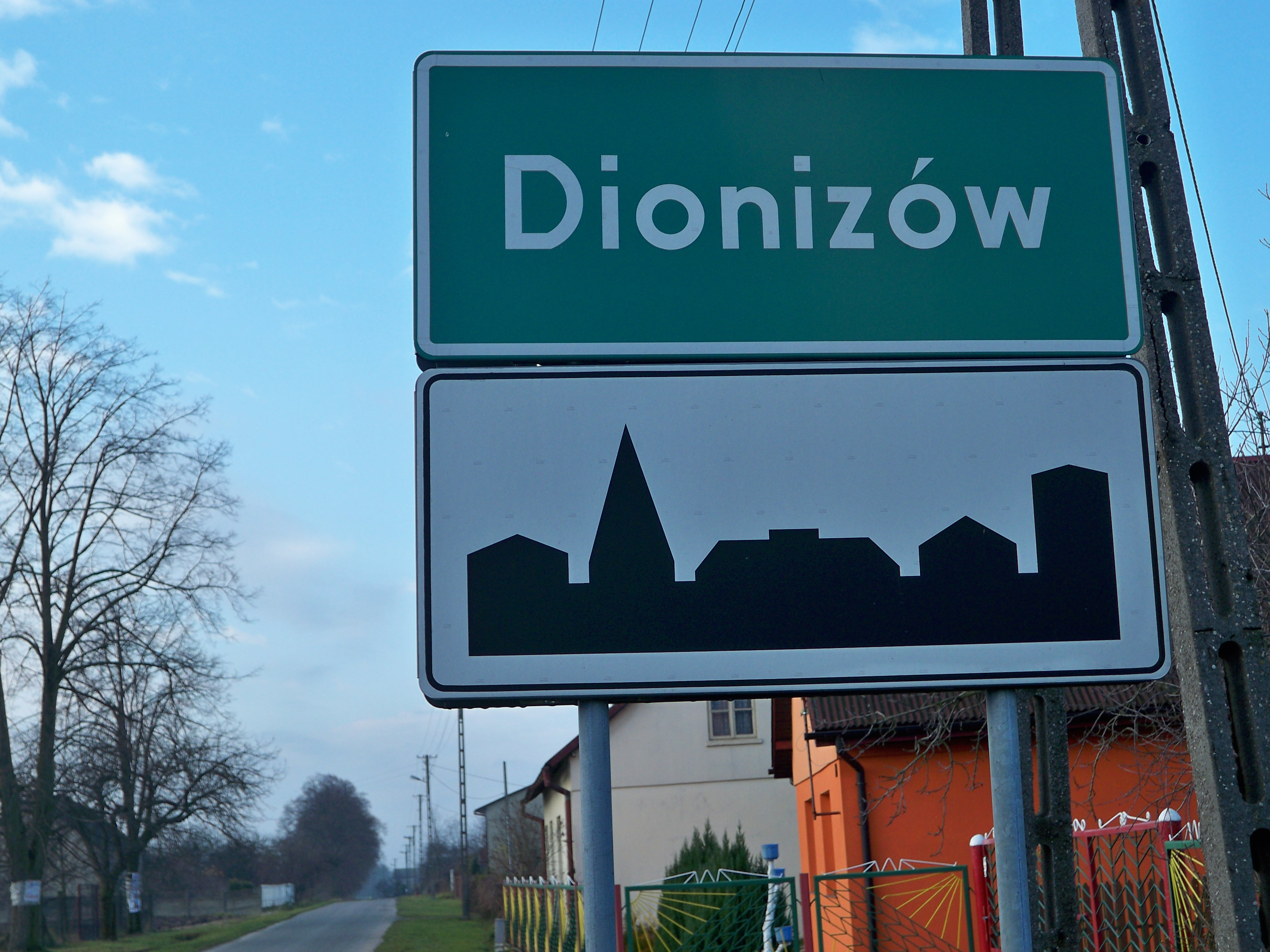

- Location within Poland
- Coordinates: 51°38′N 18°59′E
- Country: Poland
- Voivodeship: Łódź
- County: Zduńska Wola
- Gmina: Zduńska Wola
- Population: 79

Dionizów [djɔˈnizuf] is a village in the administrative district of Gmina Zduńska Wola, within Zduńska Wola County, Łódź Voivodeship, in central Poland.
