= Przatów Dolny =

- Village
- Location within Poland
- Coordinates: 51°41′5″N 19°0′54″E
- Country: Poland
- Voivodeship: Łódź
- County: Zduńska Wola
- Gmina: Szadek
- Population: 150

Przatów Dolny [ˈpʂatuf ˈdɔlnɨ] is a village in the administrative district of Gmina Szadek, within Zduńska Wola County, Łódź Voivodeship, in central Poland.
