= Wojsławice, Zduńska Wola County =

Wojsławice
- Village
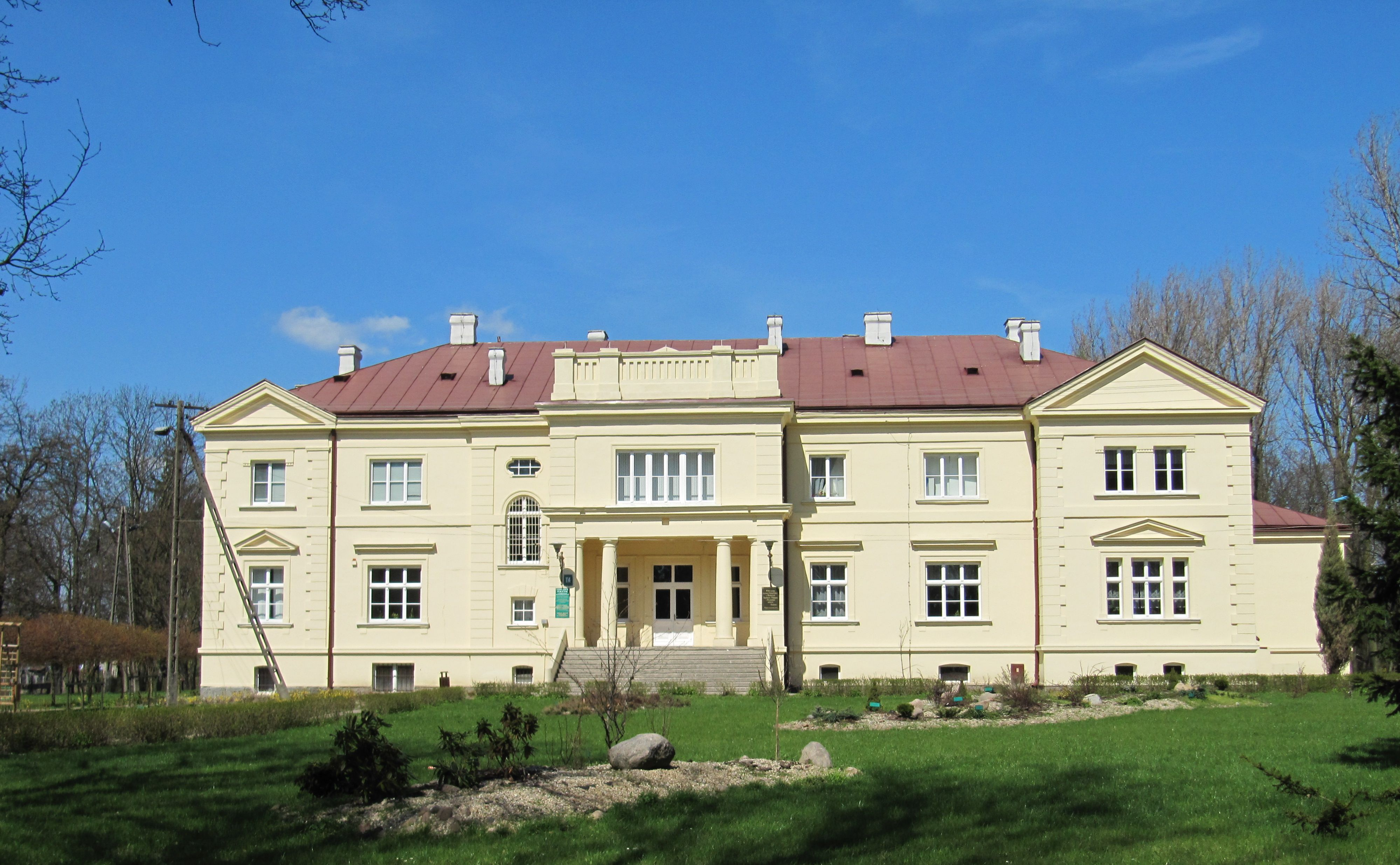
- Palace

- Location within Poland
- Coordinates: 51°40′N 18°56′E
- Country: Poland
- Voivodeship: Łódź
- County: Zduńska Wola
- Gmina: Zduńska Wola
- Population: 610

Wojsławice [vɔi̯swaˈvit͡sɛ] is a village in the administrative district of Gmina Zduńska Wola, within Zduńska Wola County, Łódź Voivodeship, in central Poland.
