= Mostki =

Mostki may refer to the following places:

- Mostki, Kuyavian-Pomeranian Voivodeship (north-central Poland)
- Mostki, Łódź Voivodeship (central Poland)
- Mostki, Podlaskie Voivodeship (north-east Poland)
- Mostki, Lesser Poland Voivodeship (south Poland)
- Mostki, Subcarpathian Voivodeship (south-east Poland)
- Mostki, Skarżysko County in Świętokrzyskie Voivodeship (south-central Poland)
- Mostki, Staszów County in Świętokrzyskie Voivodeship (south-central Poland)
- Mostki, Masovian Voivodeship (east-central Poland)
- Mostki, Konin County in Greater Poland Voivodeship (west-central Poland)
- Mostki, Ostrzeszów County in Greater Poland Voivodeship (west-central Poland)
- Mostki, Lubusz Voivodeship (west Poland)
- Mostki, Opole Voivodeship (south-west Poland)
