= Górna Wola =

Górna Wola may refer to the following places in Poland:

- Górna Wola, Łódź Voivodeship (central Poland)
- Górna Wola, Masovian Voivodeship (east-central Poland)
