= Rębieskie =

- Village
- Location within Poland
- Coordinates: 51°39′3″N 18°52′27″E
- Country: Poland
- Voivodeship: Łódź
- County: Zduńska Wola
- Gmina: Zduńska Wola

Rębieskie [rɛmˈbjɛskʲɛ] is a village in the administrative district of Gmina Zduńska Wola, within Zduńska Wola County, Łódź Voivodeship, in central Poland.
