= Kotlinki =

- Village
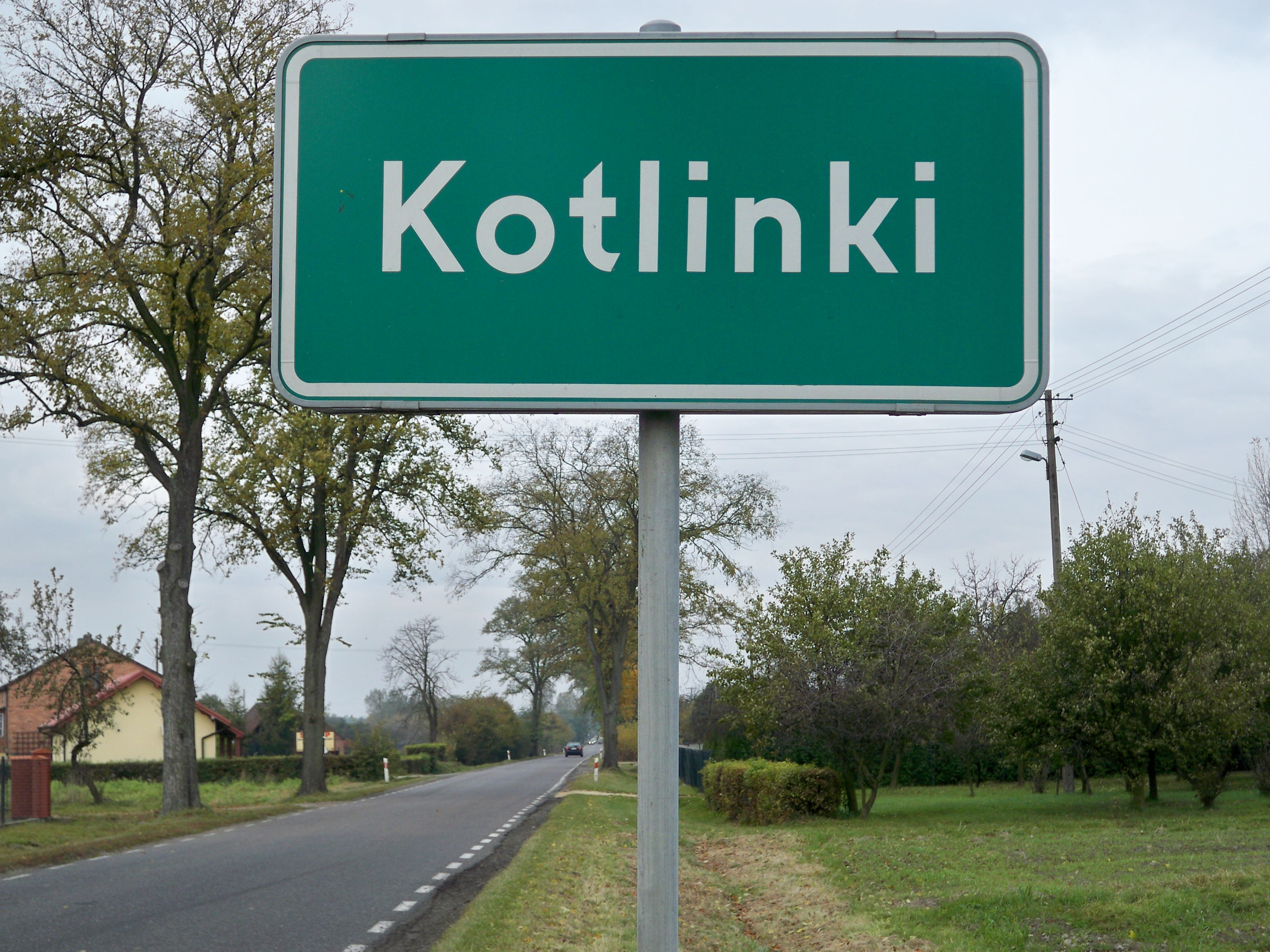

- Location within Poland
- Coordinates: 51°41′9″N 18°55′8″E
- Country: Poland
- Voivodeship: Łódź
- County: Zduńska Wola
- Gmina: Szadek
- Population: 130

Kotlinki [kɔˈtlʲiŋkʲi] is a village in the administrative district of Gmina Szadek, within Zduńska Wola County, Łódź Voivodeship, in central Poland.
