= Jamno, Zduńska Wola County =

Jamno
- Village
- Location within Poland
- Coordinates: 51°41′58″N 18°53′1″E
- Country: Poland
- Voivodeship: Łódź
- County: Zduńska Wola
- Gmina: Szadek
- Population: 40

Jamno [ˈjamnɔ] is a village in the administrative district of Gmina Szadek, within Zduńska Wola County, Łódź Voivodeship, in central Poland.
