= Wola Łobudzka =

- Village
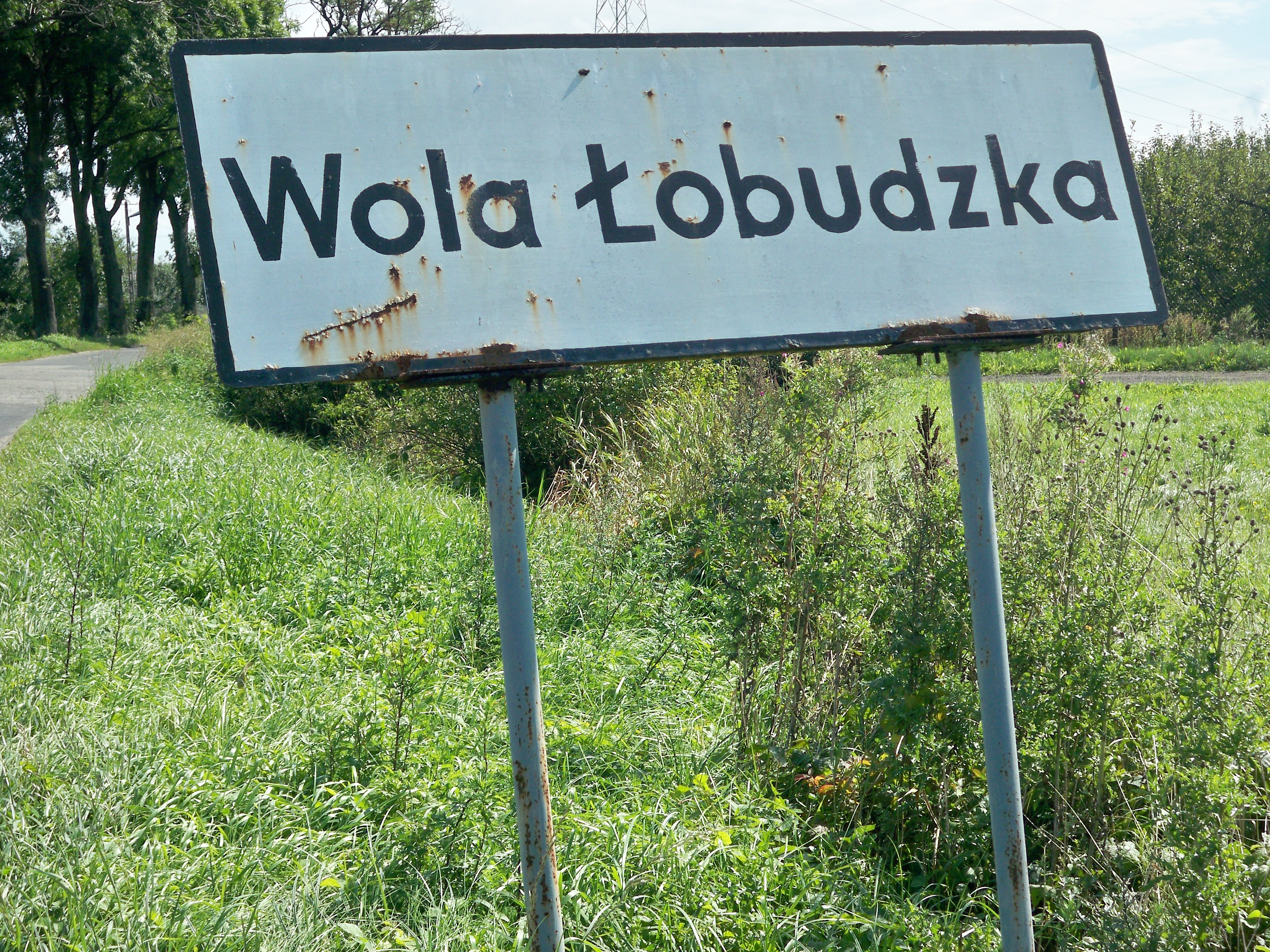

- Location within Poland
- Coordinates: 51°45′N 19°3′E
- Country: Poland
- Voivodeship: Łódź
- County: Zduńska Wola
- Gmina: Szadek

Wola Łobudzka [ˈvɔla wɔˈbut͡ska] is a village in the administrative district of Gmina Szadek, within Zduńska Wola County, Łódź Voivodeship, in central Poland.

== See also ==
- Wola, for other uses of the word
