= Zborowskie, Łódź Voivodeship =

Zborowskie
- Village
- Location within Poland
- Coordinates: 51°40′5″N 18°49′35″E
- Country: Poland
- Voivodeship: Łódź
- County: Zduńska Wola
- Gmina: Zduńska Wola

Zborowskie [zbɔˈrɔfskʲɛ] is a village in the administrative district of Gmina Zduńska Wola, within Zduńska Wola County, Łódź Voivodeship, in central Poland.
