= Reduchów =

- Village
- Location within Poland
- Coordinates: 51°41′N 18°51′E
- Country: Poland
- Voivodeship: Łódź
- County: Zduńska Wola
- Gmina: Szadek

Reduchów [rɛˈduxuf] is a village in the administrative district of Gmina Szadek, within Zduńska Wola County, Łódź Voivodeship, in central Poland.
