= Andrzejów, Zduńska Wola County =

Andrzejów
- Village
- Location within Poland
- Coordinates: 51°36′55″N 18°52′32″E
- Country: Poland
- Voivodeship: Łódź
- County: Zduńska Wola
- Gmina: Zduńska Wola
- Population: 50

Andrzejów [anˈdʐɛjuf] is a village in the administrative district of Gmina Zduńska Wola, within Zduńska Wola County, Łódź Voivodeship, in central Poland.
