= Krokocice =

- Village
- Location within Poland
- Coordinates: 51°45′5″N 18°59′35″E
- Country: Poland
- Voivodeship: Łódź
- County: Zduńska Wola
- Gmina: Szadek

Krokocice [krɔkɔˈt͡ɕit͡sɛ] is a village in the administrative district of Gmina Szadek, within Zduńska Wola County, Łódź Voivodeship, in central Poland.

Until 1954, the Krokocice commune existed. From 1954 to 1968, the village belonged to and served as the seat of the Krokocice community authorities. After its dissolution, it became part of the Wielka Wieś community. From 1975 to 1998, the village was administratively part of the Sieradz Voivodeship.
