= Wola Przatowska =

- Village
- Location within Poland
- Coordinates: 51°41′28″N 19°2′38″E
- Country: Poland
- Voivodeship: Łódź
- County: Zduńska Wola
- Gmina: Szadek

Wola Przatowska [ˈvɔla pʂaˈtɔfska] is a village in the administrative district of Gmina Szadek, within Zduńska Wola County, Łódź Voivodeship, in central Poland.
