= Zamłynie, Zduńska Wola County =

Zamłynie
- Village
- Location within Poland
- Coordinates: 51°40′14″N 18°51′36″E
- Country: Poland
- Voivodeship: Łódź
- County: Zduńska Wola
- Gmina: Zduńska Wola

Zamłynie [zamˈwɨɲɛ] is a village in the administrative district of Gmina Zduńska Wola, within Zduńska Wola County, Łódź Voivodeship, in central Poland.
