= Wymysłów, Zduńska Wola County =

Wymysłów
- Village
- Location within Poland
- Coordinates: 51°37′3″N 18°59′0″E
- Country: Poland
- Voivodeship: Łódź
- County: Zduńska Wola
- Gmina: Zduńska Wola

Wymysłów [vɨˈmɨswuf] is a village in the administrative district of Gmina Zduńska Wola, within Zduńska Wola County, Łódź Voivodeship, in central Poland.
