= Nowe Rębieskie =

- Village
- Location within Poland
- Coordinates: 51°39′43″N 18°52′13″E
- Country: Poland
- Voivodeship: Łódź
- County: Zduńska Wola
- Gmina: Zduńska Wola

Nowe Rębieskie [ˈnɔvɛ rɛmˈbjɛskʲɛ] is a village in the administrative district of Gmina Zduńska Wola, within Zduńska Wola County, Łódź Voivodeship, in central Poland.
