= Krobanówek =

- Village
- Location within Poland
- Coordinates: 51°36′N 19°0′E
- Country: Poland
- Voivodeship: Łódź
- County: Zduńska Wola
- Gmina: Zduńska Wola
- Population: 45

Krobanówek [krɔbaˈnuvɛk] is a village in the administrative district of Gmina Zduńska Wola, within Zduńska Wola County, Łódź Voivodeship, in central Poland.
