= Tarnówka =

Tarnówka may refer to:

- Tarnówka, Złotów County in Greater Poland Voivodeship (west-central Poland)
- Tarnówka, Kuyavian-Pomeranian Voivodeship (central Poland)
- Tarnówka, Łódź Voivodeship (central Poland)
- Tarnówka, Masovian Voivodeship (east-central Poland)
- Tarnówka, Gmina Dąbie in Greater Poland Voivodeship (central Poland)
- Tarnówka, Gmina Grzegorzew in Greater Poland Voivodeship (central Poland)
- Tarnówka, Gmina Kłodawa in Greater Poland Voivodeship (central Poland)
