= Warta-Widawka Landscape Park =

Polish Landscape Park

Coordinates: 51°28′55″N 18°52′35″E

- Park Krajobrazowy Międzyrzecza Warty i Widawki
- IUCN category V (protected landscape/seascape)
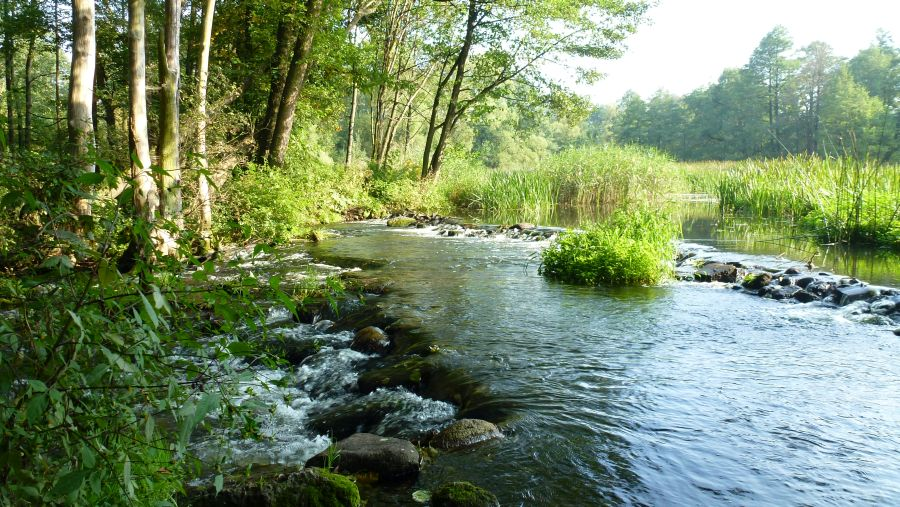
- Grabia River
- Interactive map of Warta-Widawka Landscape Park
- Location: Łódź Voivodeship
- Established: 1989

Warta-Widawka Landscape Park (Park Krajobrazowy Międzyrzecza Warty i Widawki) is a protected area (Landscape Park) in central Poland.

The Park lies within Łódź Voivodeship: in Łask County (Gmina Widawa), Sieradz County (Gmina Burzenin, Gmina Sieradz), Wieluń County (Gmina Konopnica) and Zduńska Wola County (Gmina Zapolice, Gmina Zduńska Wola).

== Characteristic ==
It was established in 1989. The total area is 25,330 ha. The subject of protection is the valleys of the Warta, Widawka and their tributaries together with the surroundings, as well as the natural vegetation accompanying these areas. In the central part of the park, there is a hydrographic junction formed by the converging rivers: Widawka, Grabia and Nieciecz. The area of the park is distinguished in its surroundings by a varied topography, especially the gorges of the Warta River, where the relative heights of the slopes reach 45 meters (between Beleń and Strońsko), and old limestone formations appear on the surface. From the high shores, visitors can observe the vast panoramas of the valley, meandering sections of rivers, oxbow lakes, dune areas, peat bogs, wetlands with an abundance of marsh plants. Forests constitute less than 25% of the total area of the Park.
