= Ochraniew =

- Village
- Location within Poland
- Coordinates: 51°37′N 18°59′E
- Country: Poland
- Voivodeship: Łódź
- County: Zduńska Wola
- Gmina: Zduńska Wola

Ochraniew [ɔˈxraɲɛf] is a village in the administrative district of Gmina Zduńska Wola, within Zduńska Wola County, Łódź Voivodeship, in central Poland.
