= Ogrodzisko =

Ogrodzisko may refer to the following places in Poland:

- Ogrodzisko, Lower Silesian Voivodeship (south-west Poland)
- Ogrodzisko, Łódź Voivodeship (central Poland)
