= Kromolin Stary =

- Village
- Location within Poland
- Coordinates: 51°40′15″N 18°54′42″E
- Country: Poland
- Voivodeship: Łódź
- County: Zduńska Wola
- Gmina: Szadek
- Population: 160

Kromolin Stary [krɔˈmɔlʲin ˈstarɨ] is a village in the administrative district of Gmina Szadek, within Zduńska Wola County, Łódź Voivodeship, in central Poland.
