= Dziadkowice, Łódź Voivodeship =

Dziadkowice
- Village
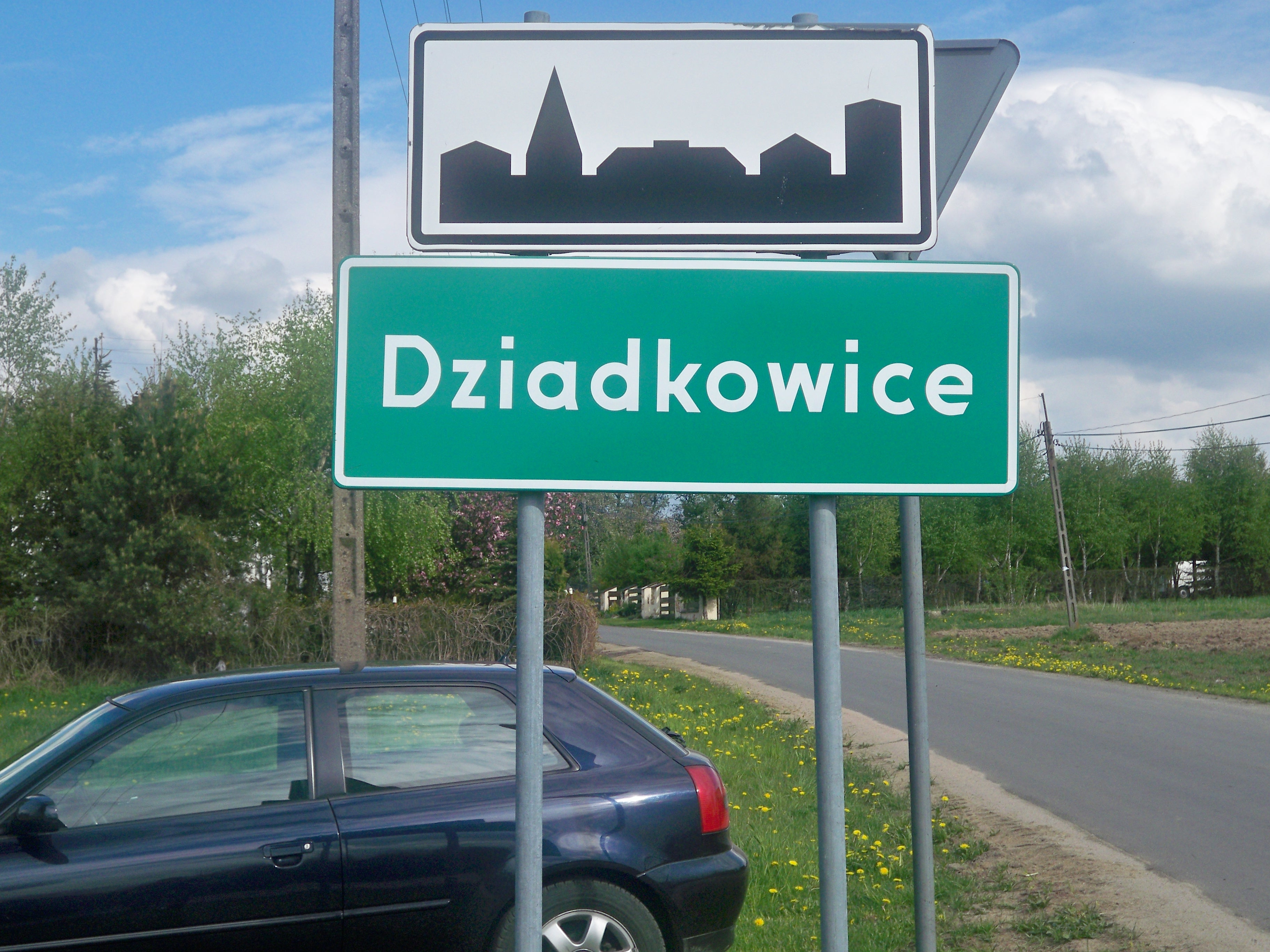

- Location within Poland
- Coordinates: 51°40′24″N 19°0′28″E
- Country: Poland
- Voivodeship: Łódź
- County: Zduńska Wola
- Gmina: Szadek

Dziadkowice [d͡ʑatkɔˈvʲit͡sɛ] is a village in the administrative district of Gmina Szadek, within Zduńska Wola County, Łódź Voivodeship, in central Poland.
