= Biały Ług =

Biały Ług may refer to the following places:

- Biały Ług, Łódź Voivodeship (central Poland)
- Biały Ług, Podlaskie Voivodeship (north-east Poland)
- Biały Ług, Świętokrzyskie Voivodeship (south-central Poland)
- Biały Ług, Piaseczno County in Masovian Voivodeship (east-central Poland)
- Biały Ług, Zwoleń County in Masovian Voivodeship (east-central Poland)
