= Tymienice, Łódź Voivodeship =

Tymienice
- Village
- Location within Poland
- Coordinates: 51°37′12″N 18°54′19″E
- Country: Poland
- Voivodeship: Łódź
- County: Zduńska Wola
- Gmina: Zduńska Wola

Tymienice [tɨmjɛˈnit͡sɛ] is a village in the administrative district of Gmina Zduńska Wola, within Zduńska Wola County, Łódź Voivodeship, in central Poland.
