= Piaski, Gmina Szadek =

Piaski
- Village
- Location within Poland
- Coordinates: 51°41′47″N 19°1′45″E
- Country: Poland
- Voivodeship: Łódź
- County: Zduńska Wola
- Gmina: Szadek

Piaski (Polish pronunciation: [ˈpjaskʲi]) is a village in the administrative district of Gmina Szadek, within Zduńska Wola County, Łódź Voivodeship, in central Poland.
