= Sikucin =

- Village
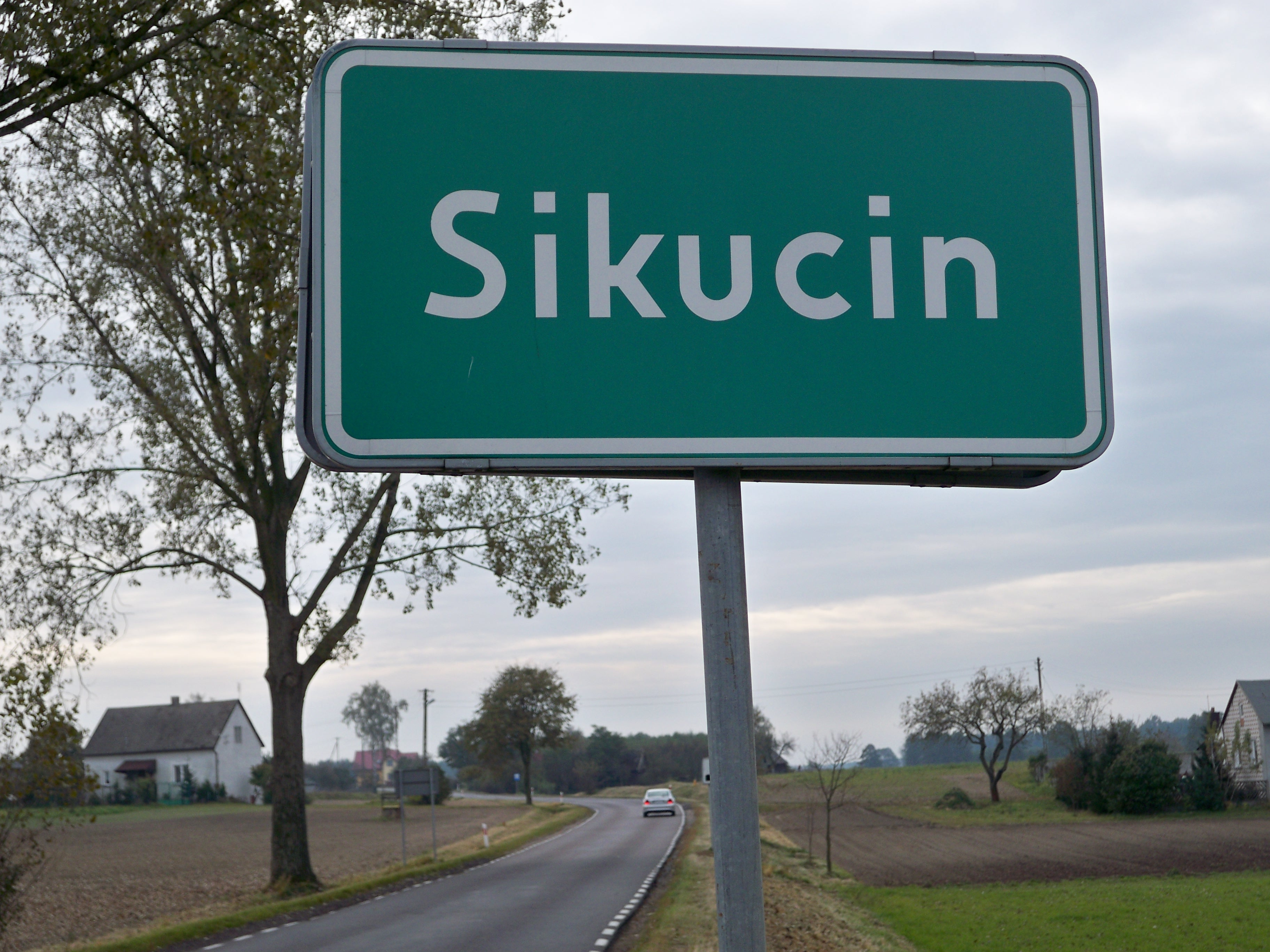

- Location within Poland
- Coordinates: 51°42′N 18°52′E
- Country: Poland
- Voivodeship: Łódź
- County: Zduńska Wola
- Gmina: Szadek

Sikucin [ɕiˈkut͡ɕin] is a village in the administrative district of Gmina Szadek, within Zduńska Wola County, Łódź Voivodeship, in central Poland.
