= Karczówek, Łódź Voivodeship =

Karczówek
- Village
- Location within Poland
- Coordinates: 51°42′0″N 18°56′54″E
- Country: Poland
- Voivodeship: Łódź
- County: Zduńska Wola
- Gmina: Szadek

Karczówek [karˈt͡ʂuvɛk] is a village in the administrative district of Gmina Szadek, within Zduńska Wola County, Łódź Voivodeship, in central Poland.
