= Choszczewo =

Choszczewo may refer to the following places:

- Choszczewo, Łódź Voivodeship (central Poland)
- Choszczewo, Podlaskie Voivodeship (north-east Poland)
- Choszczewo, Warmian-Masurian Voivodeship (north Poland)
