= Czarny Las, Zduńska Wola County =

Czarny Las
- Village
- Location within Poland
- Coordinates: 51°42′59″N 18°53′57″E
- Country: Poland
- Voivodeship: Łódź
- County: Zduńska Wola
- Gmina: Szadek
- Population: 10

Czarny Las [ˈt͡ʂarnɨ ˈlas] is a village in the administrative district of Gmina Szadek, within Zduńska Wola County, Łódź Voivodeship, in central Poland.
