= Annopol (disambiguation) =

Annopol may refer to:

- Annopol in Lublin Voivodeship (east Poland)
- Annopol, Chełm County in Lublin Voivodeship (east Poland)
- Annopol, Hrubieszów County in Lublin Voivodeship (east Poland)
- Annopol, Lubartów County in Lublin Voivodeship (east Poland)
- Annopol, Gostynin County in Masovian Voivodeship (east-central Poland)
- Annopol, Grójec County in Masovian Voivodeship (east-central Poland)
- Annopol, Przasnysz County in Masovian Voivodeship (east-central Poland)
- Annopol, Wołomin County in Masovian Voivodeship (east-central Poland)
- Annopol, Kalisz County in Greater Poland Voivodeship (west-central Poland)
- Annopol, Rawicz County in Greater Poland Voivodeship (west-central Poland)
- Annopol, in Ukraine, also spelled Hannopil (Аннополь, Ганнопіль) in Vinnyts'ka, Khmel'nyts'ka, Kharkivs'ka and Zhytomyr Oblasts

== See also ==
- Annopole (disambiguation)
