= Poręby, Zduńska Wola County =

Poręby
- Village
- Location within Poland
- Coordinates: 51°34′56″N 18°53′32″E
- Country: Poland
- Voivodeship: Łódź
- County: Zduńska Wola
- Gmina: Zduńska Wola

Poręby [pɔˈrɛmbɨ] is a village in the administrative district of Gmina Zduńska Wola, within Zduńska Wola County, Łódź Voivodeship, in central Poland.
