= Rębieskie-Kolonia =

- Village
- Location within Poland
- Coordinates: 51°39′39″N 18°52′33″E
- Country: Poland
- Voivodeship: Łódź
- County: Zduńska Wola
- Gmina: Zduńska Wola
- Population: 98

Rębieskie-Kolonia [rɛmˈbjɛskʲɛ kɔˈlɔɲa] is a village in the administrative district of Gmina Zduńska Wola, within Zduńska Wola County, Łódź Voivodeship, in central Poland.
