= Krobanów =

- Village
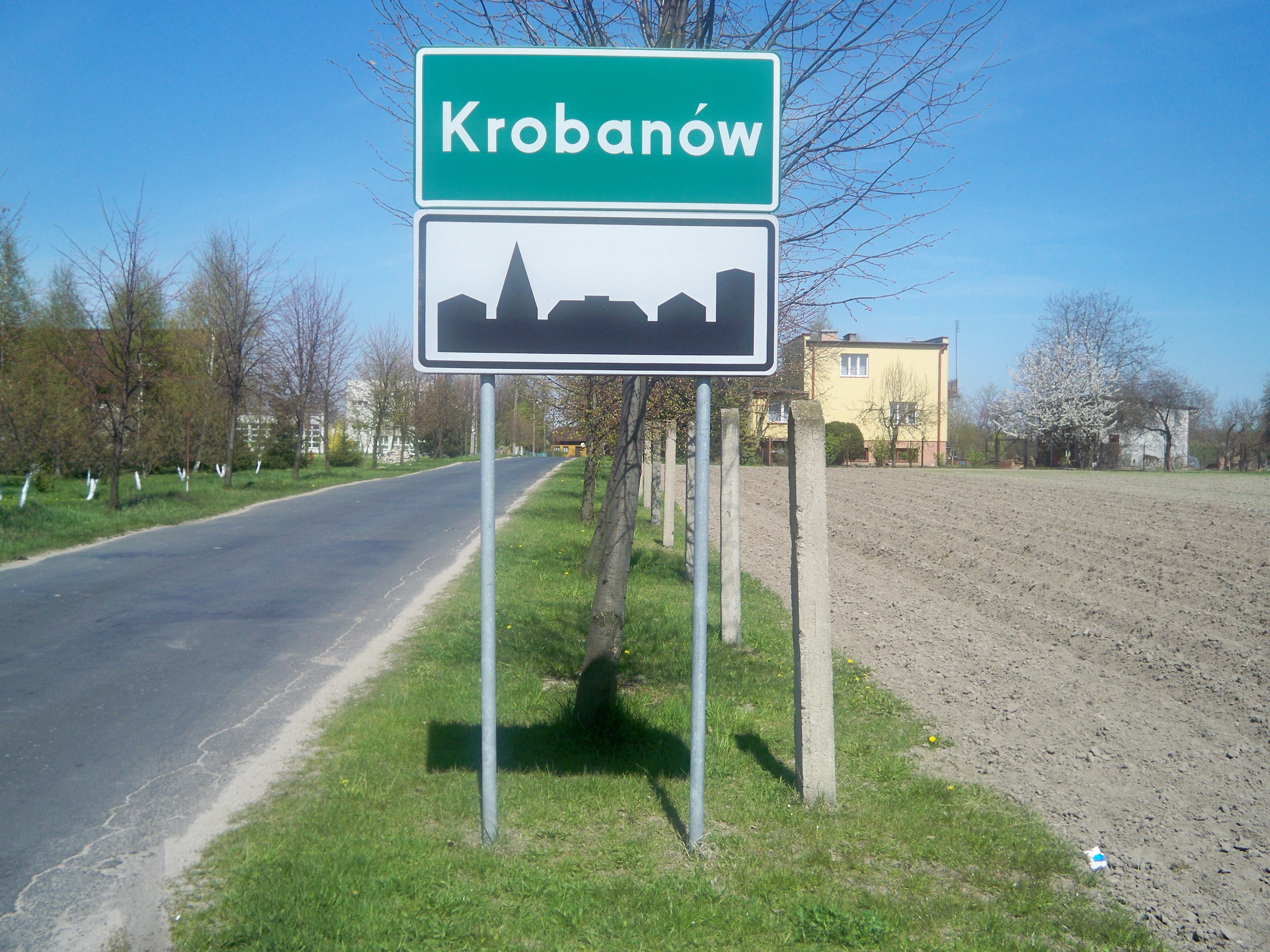

- Location within Poland
- Coordinates: 51°35′44″N 19°0′2″E
- Country: Poland
- Voivodeship: Łódź
- County: Zduńska Wola
- Gmina: Zduńska Wola

Zduńska Wola [krɔˈbanuf] is a village in the administrative district of Gmina Zduńska Wola, within Zduńska Wola County, Łódź Voivodeship, in central Poland.
