= Grzybów, Łódź Voivodeship =

Grzybów
- Village
- Location within Poland
- Coordinates: 51°42′30″N 18°54′45″E
- Country: Poland
- Voivodeship: Łódź
- County: Zduńska Wola
- Gmina: Szadek

Grzybów [ˈɡʐɨbuf] is a village in the administrative district of Gmina Szadek, within Zduńska Wola County, Łódź Voivodeship, in central Poland.
