= Piaski, Gmina Zduńska Wola =

Piaski
- Village
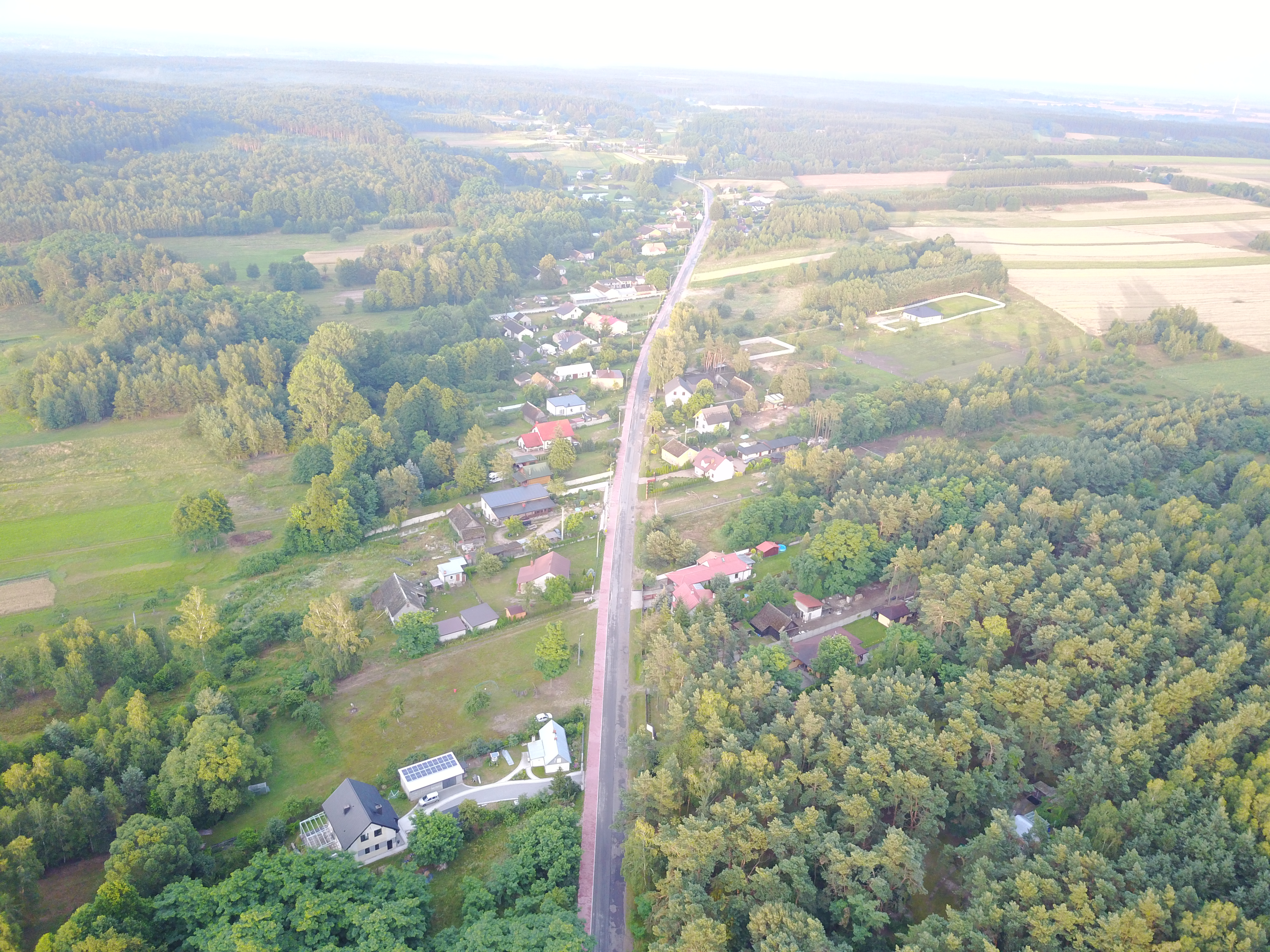

- Location within Poland
- Coordinates: 51°34′12″N 18°51′24″E
- Country: Poland
- Voivodeship: Łódź
- County: Zduńska Wola
- Gmina: Zduńska Wola

Piaski (Polish pronunciation: [ˈpjaskʲi]) is a village in the administrative district of Gmina Zduńska Wola, within Zduńska Wola County, Łódź Voivodeship, in central Poland.
