= Ogrodzim =

- Village
- Location within Poland
- Coordinates: 51°40′41″N 18°59′1″E
- Country: Poland
- Voivodeship: Łódź
- County: Zduńska Wola
- Gmina: Szadek
- Population: 110

Ogrodzim [ɔˈɡrɔd͡ʑim] is a village in the administrative district of Gmina Szadek, within Zduńska Wola County, Łódź Voivodeship, in central Poland.
