= Kłady =

- Village
- Location within Poland
- Coordinates: 51°38′09″N 18°58′55″E
- Country: Poland
- Voivodeship: Łódź
- County: Zduńska Wola
- Gmina: Zduńska Wola

Kłady [ˈkwadɨ] is a village in the administrative district of Gmina Zduńska Wola, within Zduńska Wola County, Łódź Voivodeship, in central Poland.
