= Antonin, Zduńska Wola County =

Antonin
- Village
- Location within Poland
- Coordinates: 51°43′50″N 19°2′24″E
- Country: Poland
- Voivodeship: Łódź
- County: Zduńska Wola
- Gmina: Szadek
- Population: 40

Antonin [anˈtɔɲin] is a village in the administrative district of Gmina Szadek, within Zduńska Wola County, Łódź Voivodeship, in central Poland.
