= Kobyla Miejska =

- Village
- Location within Poland
- Coordinates: 51°43′N 18°56′E
- Country: Poland
- Voivodeship: Łódź
- County: Zduńska Wola
- Gmina: Szadek

Kobyla Miejska [kɔˈbɨla ˈmʲɛi̯ska] is a village in the administrative district of Gmina Szadek, within Zduńska Wola County, Łódź Voivodeship, in central Poland.
