= Wielka Wieś, Zduńska Wola County =

Wielka Wieś
- Village
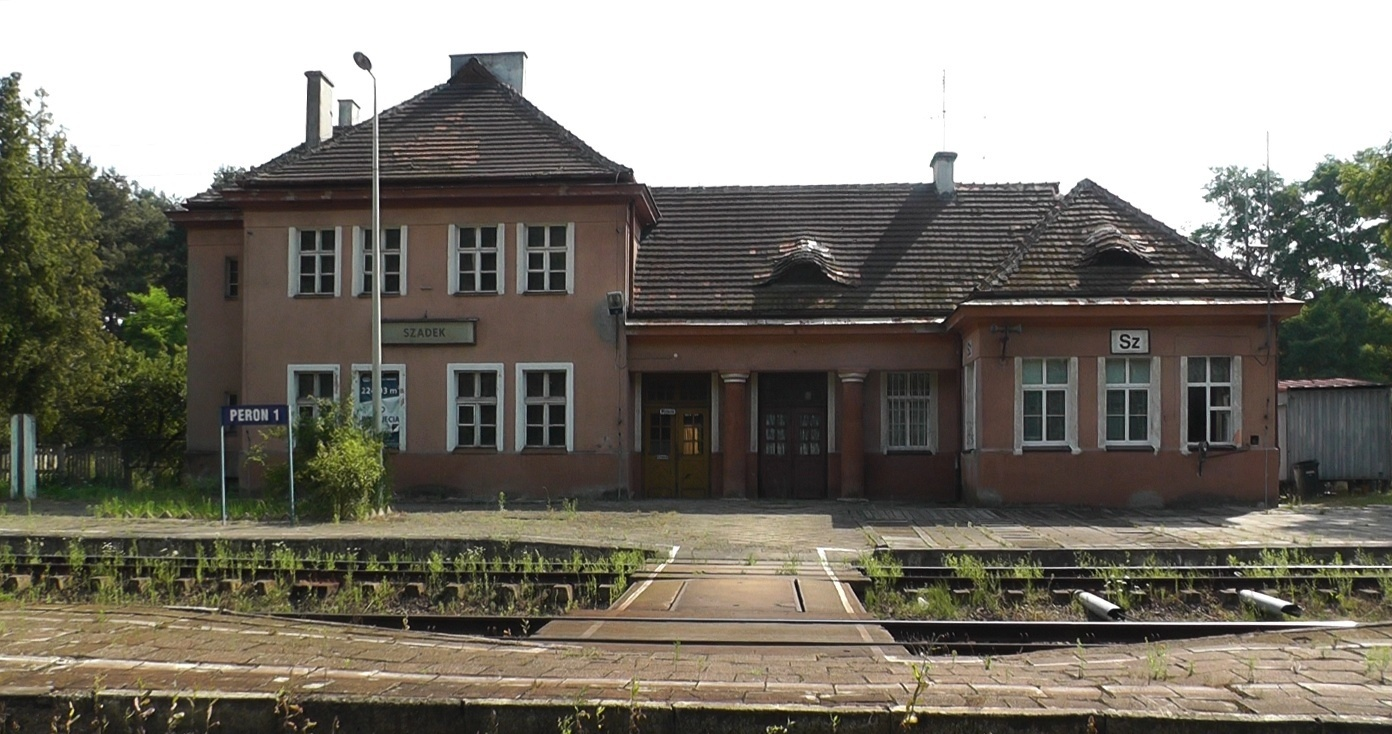
- Railway station

- Location within Poland
- Coordinates: 51°40′57″N 18°57′4″E
- Country: Poland
- Voivodeship: Łódź
- County: Zduńska Wola
- Gmina: Szadek

Wielka Wieś [ˈvʲɛlka ˈvʲɛɕ] is a village in the administrative district of Gmina Szadek, within Zduńska Wola County, Łódź Voivodeship, in central Poland.
