= Kotliny, Zduńska Wola County =

Kotliny
- Village
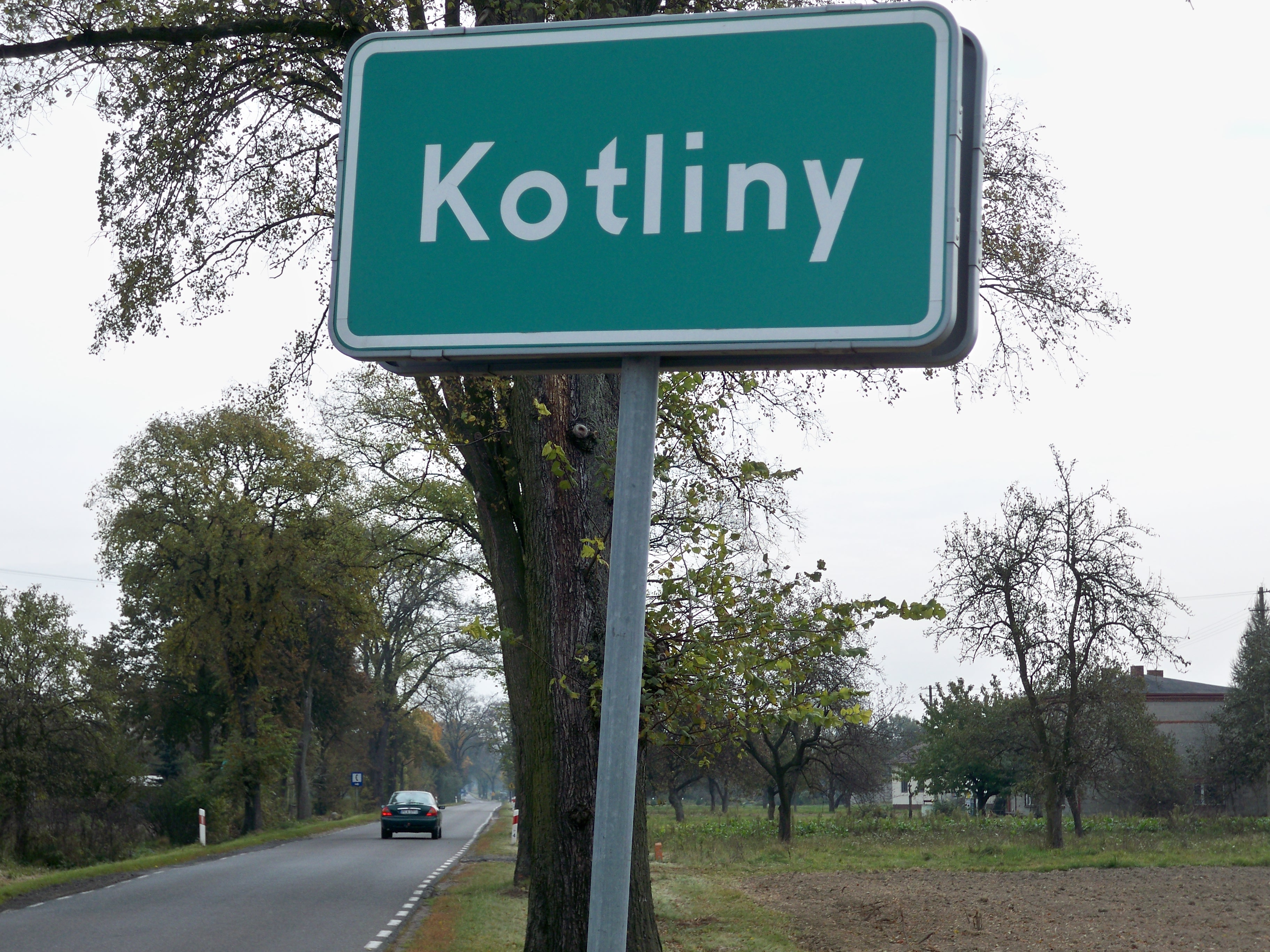

- Location within Poland
- Coordinates: 51°41′19″N 18°54′9″E
- Country: Poland
- Voivodeship: Łódź
- County: Zduńska Wola
- Gmina: Szadek

Kotliny [kɔˈtlʲinɨ] is a village in the administrative district of Gmina Szadek, within Zduńska Wola County, Łódź Voivodeship, in central Poland.
