= Izabelów, Łódź Voivodeship =

Izabelów
- Village
- Location within Poland
- Coordinates: 51°37′27″N 18°53′43″E
- Country: Poland
- Voivodeship: Łódź
- County: Zduńska Wola
- Gmina: Zduńska Wola
- Population: 900

Izabelów [izaˈbɛluf] is a village in the administrative district of Gmina Zduńska Wola, within Zduńska Wola County, Łódź Voivodeship, in central Poland.
