= Kęszyce, Łódź Voivodeship =

Kęszyce
- Village
- Location within Poland
- Coordinates: 51°38′16″N 19°00′01″E
- Country: Poland
- Voivodeship: Łódź
- County: Zduńska Wola
- Gmina: Zduńska Wola

Kęszyce [kɛ̃ˈʂɨt͡sɛ] is a village in the administrative district of Gmina Zduńska Wola, within Zduńska Wola County, Łódź Voivodeship, in central Poland.
