= Wiktorów, Zduńska Wola County =

Wiktorów
- Settlement
- Location within Poland
- Coordinates: 51°38′45″N 18°52′23″E
- Country: Poland
- Voivodeship: Łódź
- County: Zduńska Wola
- Gmina: Zduńska Wola
- Population: 4

Wiktorów [vikˈtɔruf] is a settlement in the administrative district of Gmina Zduńska Wola, within Zduńska Wola County, Łódź Voivodeship, in central Poland.
