= Karsznice, Zduńska Wola County =

Karsznice
- Village
- Location within Poland
- Coordinates: 51°34′46″N 19°1′2″E
- Country: Poland
- Voivodeship: Łódź
- County: Zduńska Wola
- Gmina: Zduńska Wola

Karsznice [karʂˈnit͡sɛ] is a village in the administrative district of Gmina Zduńska Wola, within Zduńska Wola County, Łódź Voivodeship, in central Poland.
