= Lichawa, Zduńska Wola County =

Lichawa
- Village
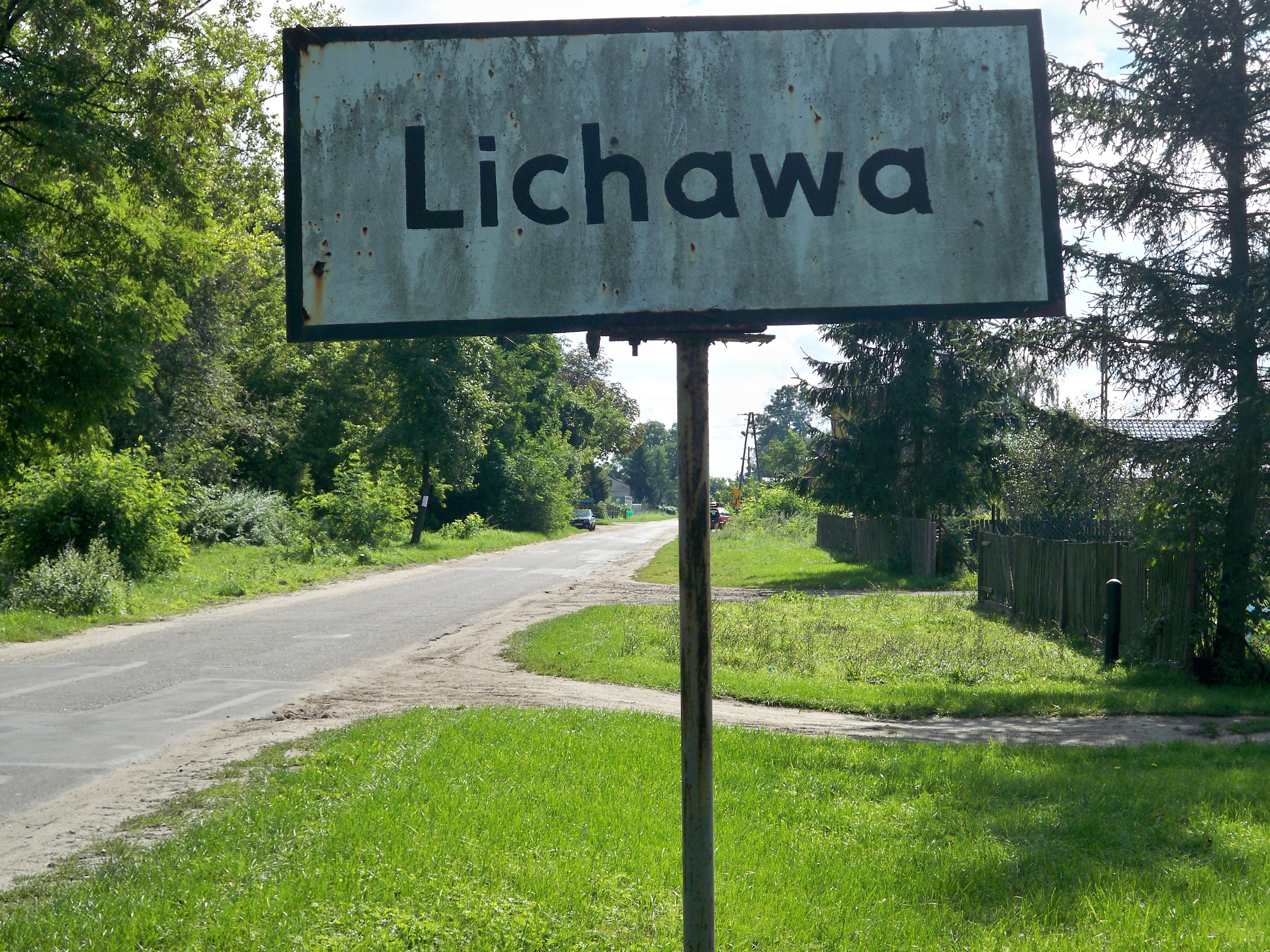

- Location within Poland
- Coordinates: 51°45′36″N 19°0′3″E
- Country: Poland
- Voivodeship: Łódź
- County: Zduńska Wola
- Gmina: Szadek

Lichawa [lʲiˈxava] is a village in the administrative district of Gmina Szadek, within Zduńska Wola County, Łódź Voivodeship, in central Poland.
