= Nowy Kromolin =

- Village
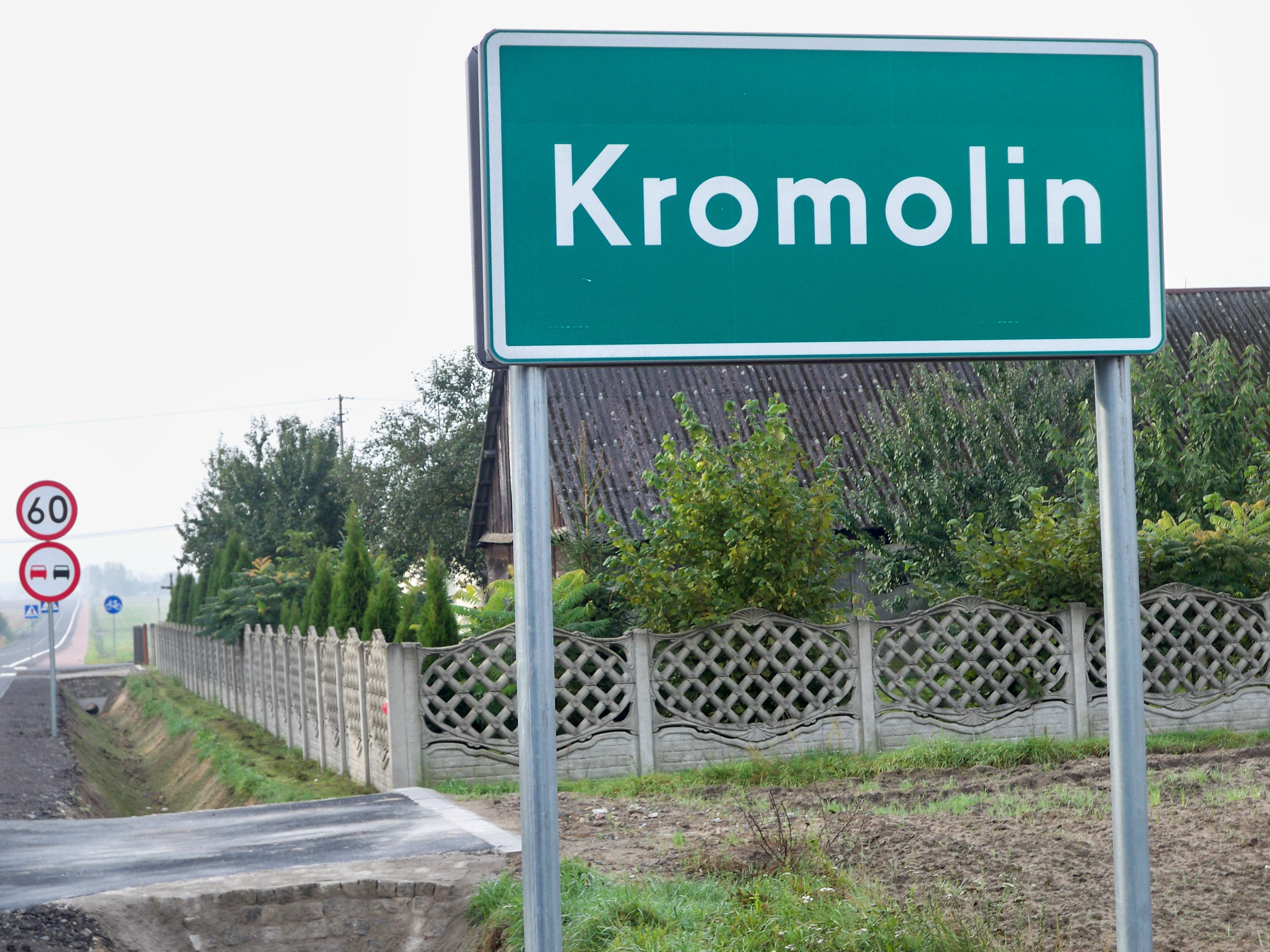

- Location within Poland
- Coordinates: 51°41′12″N 18°56′24″E
- Country: Poland
- Voivodeship: Łódź
- County: Zduńska Wola
- Gmina: Szadek
- Population: 60

Nowy Kromolin [ˈnɔvɨ krɔˈmɔlʲin] is a village in the administrative district of Gmina Szadek, within Zduńska Wola County, Łódź Voivodeship, in central Poland.
