= Michałów, Zduńska Wola County =

Michałów
- Village
- Location within Poland
- Coordinates: 51°35′40″N 19°0′36″E
- Country: Poland
- Voivodeship: Łódź
- County: Zduńska Wola
- Gmina: Zduńska Wola

Michałów [miˈxawuf] is a village in the administrative district of Gmina Zduńska Wola, within Zduńska Wola County, Łódź Voivodeship, in central Poland.
