= Czechy, Łódź Voivodeship =

Czechy
- Village
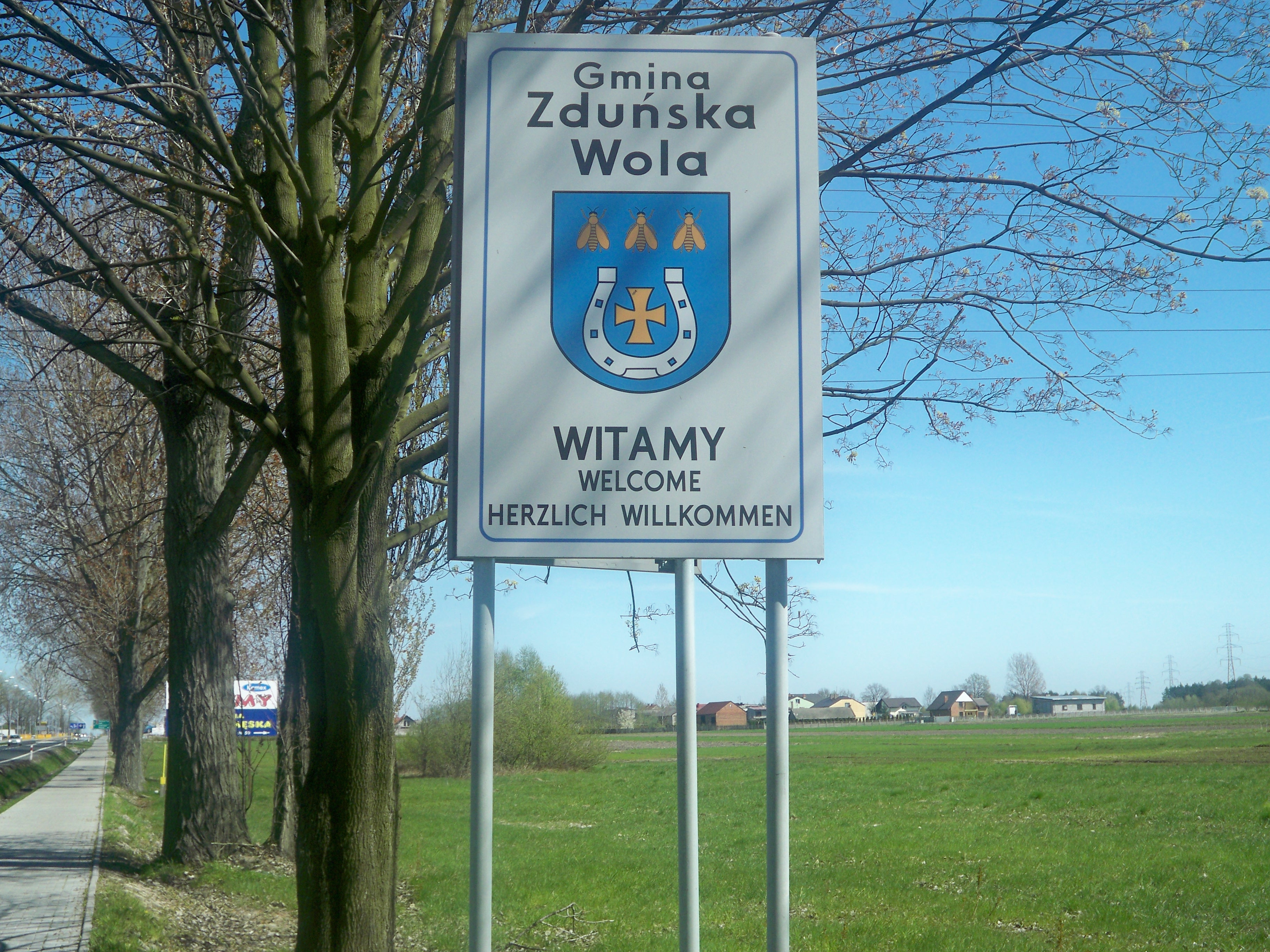

- Location within Poland
- Coordinates: 51°36′25″N 18°53′32″E
- Country: Poland
- Voivodeship: Łódź
- County: Zduńska Wola
- Gmina: Zduńska Wola
- Population: 1,600

Czechy [ˈt͡ʂɛxɨ] is a village in the administrative district of Gmina Zduńska Wola, within Zduńska Wola County, Łódź Voivodeship, in central Poland.
