= Janiszewice =

- Village
- Location within Poland
- Coordinates: 51°37′N 18°57′E
- Country: Poland
- Voivodeship: Łódź
- County: Zduńska Wola
- Gmina: Zduńska Wola
- Vehicle registration: EZD

Janiszewice [janiʂɛˈvit͡sɛ] is a village in the administrative district of Gmina Zduńska Wola, within Zduńska Wola County, Łódź Voivodeship, in central Poland.

During the German occupation of Poland (World War II), the German administration operated a Nazi prison in Janiszewice that was subordinate to the prison in Sieradz.
