= Łobudzice, Zduńska Wola County =

Łobudzice
- Village
- Location within Poland
- Coordinates: 51°44′46″N 19°1′6″E
- Country: Poland
- Voivodeship: Łódź
- County: Zduńska Wola
- Gmina: Szadek

Łobudzice [wɔbuˈd͡ʑit͡sɛ] is a village in the administrative district of Gmina Szadek, within Zduńska Wola County, Łódź Voivodeship, in central Poland.
