= Hyoscyamine/hexamethylenetetramine/phenyl salicylate/methylene blue/benzoic acid =

Combination drug

Combination of
- Hyoscyamine: Antimuscarinic antispasmodic
- Hexamethylenetetramine: Bacteriostatic
- Phenyl salicylate: Antiseptic, analgesic
- Methylene blue: Antiseptic
- Benzoic acid: Acidifier, antifungal

Clinical data
- Trade names: Hyophen, Methylphen, Urophen, Urised
- AHFS/Drugs.com: FDA Professional Drug Information
- Routes of administration: By mouth

Identifiers
- ChemSpider: none

Hyoscyamine/hexamethylenetetramine/phenyl salicylate/methylene blue/benzoic acid is a combination drug used to treat pain caused by urinary tract infections and spasms of the urinary tract. It is currently sold under multiple brand names in the US, eg. Hyophen, Methylphen, Urophen, Urised. It was formerly sold as Prosed/DS, but this particular brand name was discontinued.

It contains:

- Hyoscyamine
- Hexamethylenetetramine
- Phenyl salicylate
- Methylene blue
- Benzoic acid
