= Ostrówek, Zduńska Wola County =

Ostrówek
- Village
- Location within Poland
- Coordinates: 51°35′29″N 19°1′48″E
- Country: Poland
- Voivodeship: Łódź
- County: Zduńska Wola
- Gmina: Zduńska Wola
- Population: 210

Ostrówek [ɔsˈtruvɛk] is a village in the administrative district of Gmina Zduńska Wola, within Zduńska Wola County, Łódź Voivodeship, in central Poland.
