= Przatów Górny =

- Village
- Location within Poland
- Coordinates: 51°40′N 19°1′E
- Country: Poland
- Voivodeship: Łódź
- County: Zduńska Wola
- Gmina: Szadek

Przatów Górny [ˈpʂatuf ˈɡurnɨ] is a village in the administrative district of Gmina Szadek, within Zduńska Wola County, Łódź Voivodeship, in central Poland.
