= Wilamów, Zduńska Wola County =

Wilamów
- Village
- Location within Poland
- Coordinates: 51°41′56″N 19°3′52″E
- Country: Poland
- Voivodeship: Łódź
- County: Zduńska Wola
- Gmina: Szadek

Wilamów [vʲiˈlamuf] is a village in the administrative district of Gmina Szadek, within Zduńska Wola County, Łódź Voivodeship, in central Poland.
