= Biały Ług, Łódź Voivodeship =

Biały Ług
- Village
- Location within Poland
- Coordinates: 51°36′23″N 18°59′8″E
- Country: Poland
- Voivodeship: Łódź
- County: Zduńska Wola
- Gmina: Zduńska Wola

Biały Ług [ˈbjawɨ ˈwuk] is a village in the administrative district of Gmina Zduńska Wola, within Zduńska Wola County, Łódź Voivodeship, in central Poland.
