= Mariinsky Girls' Gymnasiums =

School network in the Russian Empire

Mariinsky Girls' Gymnasiums (Russian: Мариинская гимназия) was a network of women's secondary educational institutions in the Russian Empire. It was sponsored by the Office of the Institutions of Empress Maria Feodorovna, and named in honor of Empress Maria Alexandrovna (wife of Emperor Alexander II). The schools provided 7-year education. In 1913, there were 35 such gymnasiums with about 16,000 students. Most gymnasiums were closed after the October Revolution.

== History ==
The first Mariinsky school was opened in Saint Petersburg in March 1858. The school was championed by the Russian educator Nikolai Vyshnegradsky and supported by the Duke Peter of Oldenburg. It was an experimental school that admitted girls regardless of their social class (noble girls could attend one of the Institutes for Noble Maidens). After two years, the school was reorganized into Mariinsky Gymnasium and similar schools quickly spread throughout the empire. In 1862, there were 12 Mariinsky Gymnasiums. The number grew to 25 in 1867.

The curriculum included religion, Russian language and literature, French and German languages, history, geography, natural science, arithmetic and geometry, the basics of pedagogy, calligraphy, drawing, singing, needlework, dancing. Many graduates received certificates of home tutors (private teachers). The schools were mainly funded by tuition fees which, on average, comprised about 70% of the budget. They received about 13–16% of their revenue from the Office of the Institutions of Empress Maria.

According to the charter of 1862, girls of all religions, including Jewish, and social classes could attend the Mariinsky gymnasiums. During the second half of the 19th century, the proportion of children of urban classes gradually increased (from 27.3% to 36.5%), and the number of noblewomen decreased (from 54.3% to 50.2%).

== List of schools ==
Mariinsky girls' gymnasiums on the territory of Azerbaijan:

- Mariinsky Girls' Gymnasium (Baku)
- Mariinsky Girls' Gymnasium (Shusha) (since 1875)

Mariinsky girls' gymnasiums on the territory of Belarus:

- Mariinsky Girls' Gymnasium (Vitebsk)
- Mariinsky Girls' Gymnasium (Hrodna)
- Mariinsky Girls' Gymnasium (Minsk)

Mariinsky girls' gymnasiums on the territory of Lithuania:

- Mariinsky Girls' Gymnasium (Vilnius) (since 1869)

Mariinsky girls' gymnasiums on the territory of Russia:

- Mariinsky Girls' Gymnasium (Astrakhan) (since 1867)
- Mariinsky Girls' Gymnasium (Achinsk)
- Mariinsky Girls' Gymnasium (Vologda) (since 1862)
- Mariinsky Girls' Gymnasium (Vyatka) (since 1865)
- Mariinsky Girls' Gymnasium (Ekaterinoslav) (since 1870)
- Mariinsky Girls' Gymnasium (Kazan)
- Mariinsky Girls' Gymnasium (Krasnoyarsk)
- Mariinsky Girls' Gymnasium (Kursk)
- Mariinsky Girls' Gymnasium (Novocherkassk) (since 1860)
- Mariinsky Girls' Gymnasium (Nizhny Novgorod) (since 1870)
- Mariinsky Girls' Gymnasium (Perm) (since 1871)
- Mariinsky Girls' Gymnasium (Petrozavodsk) (since 1870)
- Mariinsky Girls' Gymnasium (Pskov)
- Mariinsky Girls' Gymnasium (Ryazan)
- Mariinsky Girls' Gymnasium (St. Petersburg) (since 1858)
- Mariinsky Girls' Gymnasium (Saratov)
- Mariinsky Girls' Gymnasium (Simbirsk) (since 1864)
- Mariinsky Girls' Gymnasium (Smolensk) (since 1870)
- Mariinsky Girls' Gymnasium (Taganrog) (since 1862)
- Mariinsky Girls' Gymnasium (Tsarskoe Selo) (since 1865)
- Mariinsky Girls' Gymnasium (Tomsk) (since 1863)
- Mariinsky Girls' Gymnasium (Tver)
- Mariinsky Girls' Gymnasium (Ufa) (since 1865)
- Mariinsky Girls' Gymnasium (Cherepovets)
- Mariinsky Girls' Gymnasium (Yaroslavl)

Mariinsky girls' gymnasiums on the territory of Ukraine:

- Mariinsky Girls' Gymnasium (Katerinoslav) (since 1870)
- Mariinsky Girls' Gymnasium (Kamyants-Podilskyi) (since 1867)
- Mariinsky Girls' Gymnasium (Kremenchuk)
- Mariinsky Girls' Gymnasium (Mariupol) (since 1875)
- Mariinsky Girls' Gymnasium (Mykolaiv) (since 1870)
- Mariinsky Girls' Gymnasium (Odesa) (since 1868)
- Mariinsky Girls' Gymnasium (Kherson)
- Mariinsky Girls' Gymnasium (Kyiv)
- Mariinsky Girls' Gymnasium (Zhytomyr)
- Mariinsky Girls' Gymnasium (Poltava)
- Mariinsky Girls' Gymnasium (Kharkiv)
