= Julia Lermontova =

Russian chemist

- Юлия Всеволодовна Лермонтова
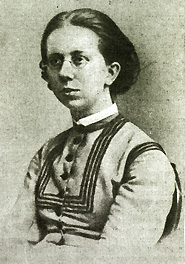
- Born: Julia Lermontova; 21 December 1846; St. Petersburg, Russia
- Died: 16 December 1919 (aged 72)
- Education: Petrovskaia Agricultural College; University of Göttingen (PhD)
- Known for: First Russian female doctorate in chemistry
- Scientific career
- Fields: Chemistry

Julia Vsevolodovna Lermontova (Russian: Юлия Всеволодовна Лермонтова) (21 December 1846 – 16 December 1919 O.S. 2 January 1847) was a Russian chemist. She is known as the first Russian woman to earn a doctorate in chemistry. She studied at the University of Heidelberg and the University of Berlin before she received her doctorate by the University of Göttingen in 1874. She was inducted to the Russian Chemical Society in 1875.

== Early life ==
Julia Vsevolodovna Lermontova was born on 21 December 1846 in St. Petersburg, Russia, to Elisawjeta Andrejevna Kossikovsky and General Vsevolod Lermontov (second cousin of the Russian poet Mikhail Lermontov), of the aristocratic Lermontov family. During most of her young life she lived in Moscow, as her father was in charge of the Moscow Cadet Corps. Since her parents were members of the Moscow intelligentsia, their children's education was a high priority. As a result, she studied under private tutors. While her family did not fully understand her interest in science, they did not discourage her, and she would read professional literature and conduct simple experiments at home.

== Education ==
=== In Russia ===
Lermontova initially wanted to study medicine, but soon discovered she could not stand the sight of skeletons or bear the poverty of her patients. She then applied to study at Petrovskaia Agricultural College (now Timirjasew-College), which was known for its excellent chemistry program. While she was supported by a number of professors there, her application was eventually rejected. It was then she decided to continue her education by going abroad, which was not easy to do at the time. Through her cousin Anna Evreinova, she met Sofia Kovalevskaia, who had entered into a marriage of convenience, which would then permit both women to study at a university abroad as Kovalevskaia would then be able to act as a chaperone. Lermontova and Kovalevskaya would live together for three years.

=== Abroad ===
In autumn 1869, at the age of 22, Julia Lermontova arrived in Heidelberg and attended Heidelberg University, where she was allowed to audit Robert Bunsen's lectures, and was eventually admitted into his lab. It was in Bunsen's lab that she researched platinum compounds. This research in the development of techniques for the separation of platinum alloys was suggested to her by Dmitri Mendeleev. From there, she moved to Berlin, in order to conduct research under German chemist August Wilhelm von Hofmann. In Berlin, she worked in Hofmann's private laboratory and was able to attend his lectures in organic chemistry. It was here that she received her first publication, "Ueber die Zusammensetzung des Diphenins". In 1874 she finished her dissertation "Zur Kenntniss der Methylenverbindungen" (which was about the analysis of methyl compounds), and that fall earned her diploma as a Doctor of Chemistry from the University of Göttingen. She graduated magna cum laude and was the first woman in the world to obtain a doctorate in chemistry.

== Research ==
The Butlerov–Eltekov–Lermontova reaction is an organic reaction which allows for the addition of branches onto hydrocarbons.

After completing her education, she returned to Russia, and began working in Vladimir Markovnikov's laboratory at the University of Moscow. She then received an invitation to move to St. Petersburg from Alexander Butlerov. Working in the chemical laboratory of St. Petersburg University under Butlerov, she undertook research on 2-methyl-2-butenoic acid.

In 1877, after the death of her father, she moved to Moscow with her family, and began working in Markovnikov's laboratory, in oil research. She was the first woman to work in this area of research. Additionally, she developed a device for the continuous distillation of petroleum, however the device was unable to be adapted to an industrial scale.

At the January 1878 conference of the Russian Chemical Society, A. P. Eltekov reported on a new method of synthesizing hydrocarbons of the formula C_{n}H_{2n}, which Butlerov noted that many of these experiments had been previously conducted by Lermontova. This research later became of value when highly branched hydrocarbon synthesis was further studied for its industrial production and use for some types of motor fuels. This process later became known as the Butlerov–Eltekov–Lermontova's reaction.

Butlerov tried to convince her to accept a position teaching at the Superior courses for women, which she would not accept, stating concerns that she may not be given permission to by the Minister of Education. In 1881, she became the first woman to join the Russian Technical Association.

== Life after research ==
As she had inherited her family's estate in Semenkovo, she made it a habit to live there in the summer months, and eventually she lived there permanently. After moving to Semenkovo permanently, she retired from chemistry. It was there she developed an interest in the agricultural sciences, developing cheese that was eventually sold throughout Russia and Ukraine. In the spring of 1889, she became seriously ill with double pneumonia, and that fall traveled to Stockholm to visit Sofia Kovalevskaya. In 1890, Kovalevskaya traveled to St. Petersburg with her daughter Fufa, where Lermontova met them and picked up her Fufa prior to Kovalevskaya's death in 1891.

In 1917, after the October revolution, an attempt was made to nationalize the estate in Semenkovo, however, through the intervention of the Minister of Education, Anatoli Lunascharski, she was permitted to keep the estate. Lermontova died in 1919 from a brain hemorrhage. While she never married, Sofia (Fufa) Kovaleyskaya (her step-daughter) inherited the entire estate.

== Publications ==
- Lermontoff, J. and Moskan (1872), Ueber die Zusammensetzung des Diphenins. Ber. Dtsch. Chem. Ges., 5: 231–236. doi:10.1002/cber.18720050172

== See also ==
- Timeline of women in science
- Anna Volkova
- Nadezhda Ziber-Shumova
