= Choszczewo, Łódź Voivodeship =

Choszczewo
- Village
- Location within Poland
- Coordinates: 51°44′4″N 18°57′9″E
- Country: Poland
- Voivodeship: Łódź
- County: Zduńska Wola
- Gmina: Szadek

Choszczewo [xɔʂˈt͡ʂɛvɔ] is a village in the administrative district of Gmina Szadek, within Zduńska Wola County, Łódź Voivodeship, in central Poland.
