= Ogrodzisko, Łódź Voivodeship =

Ogrodzisko
- Village
- Location within Poland
- Coordinates: 51°35′26″N 18°54′9″E
- Country: Poland
- Voivodeship: Łódź
- County: Zduńska Wola
- Gmina: Zduńska Wola
- Population: 290

Ogrodzisko [ɔɡrɔˈd͡ʑiskɔ] is a village in the administrative district of Gmina Zduńska Wola, within Zduńska Wola County, Łódź Voivodeship, in central Poland.
