= Górna Wola, Łódź Voivodeship =

Górna Wola
- Village
- Location within Poland
- Coordinates: 51°42′55″N 19°3′36″E
- Country: Poland
- Voivodeship: Łódź
- County: Zduńska Wola
- Gmina: Szadek

Górna Wola [ˈɡurna ˈvɔla] is a village in the administrative district of Gmina Szadek, within Zduńska Wola County, Łódź Voivodeship, in central Poland.
