= Gajewniki =

- Village
- Location within Poland
- Coordinates: 51°37′22″N 19°0′28″E
- Country: Poland
- Voivodeship: Łódź
- County: Zduńska Wola
- Gmina: Zduńska Wola

Gajewniki [ɡajɛvˈniki] is a village in the administrative district of Gmina Zduńska Wola, within Zduńska Wola County, Łódź Voivodeship, in central Poland.
