= Annopole Stare =

- Village
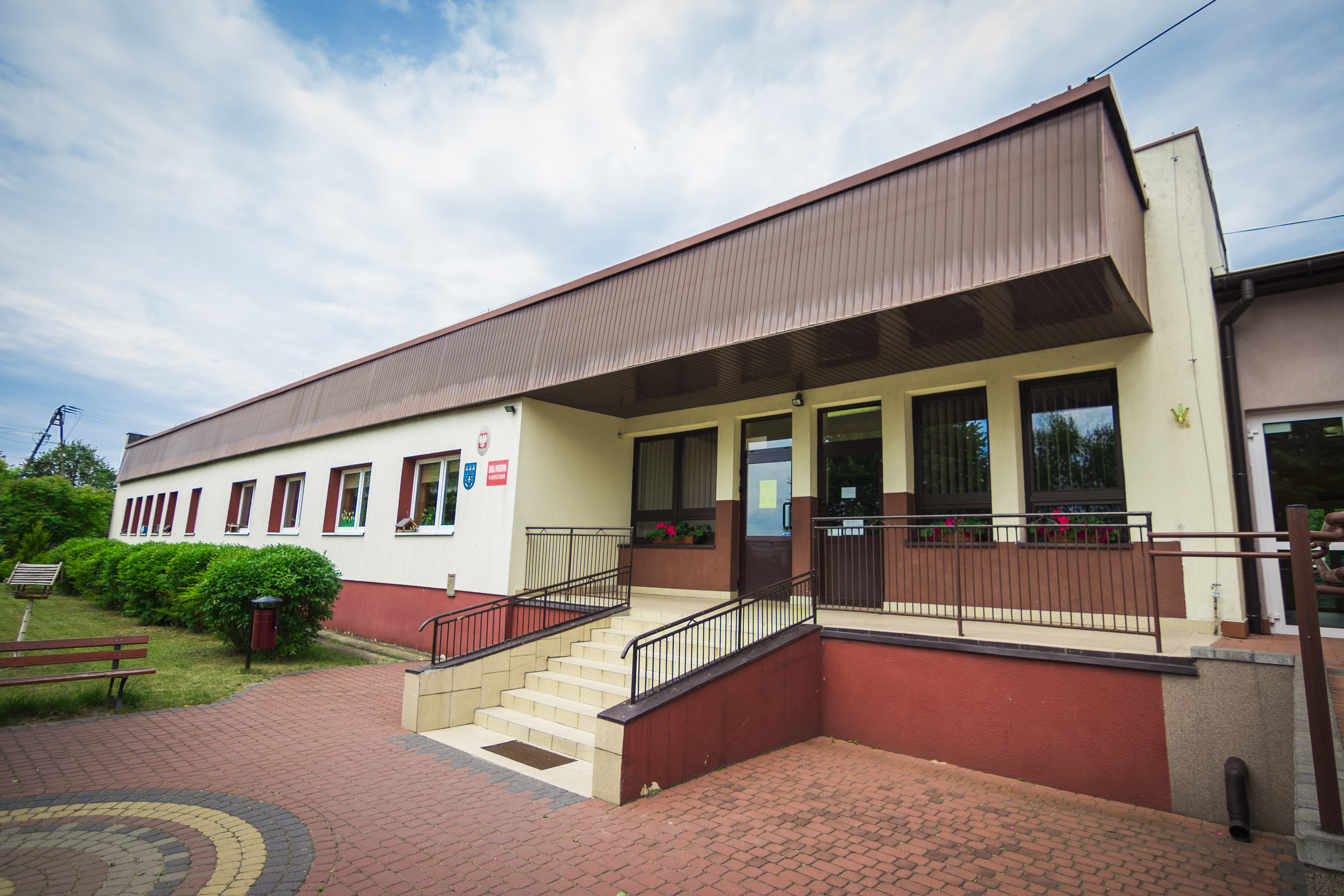
- School

- Location within Poland
- Coordinates: 51°39′39″N 18°51′5″E
- Country: Poland
- Voivodeship: Łódź
- County: Zduńska Wola
- Gmina: Zduńska Wola

Annopole Stare [annɔˈpɔlɛ ˈstarɛ] is a village in the administrative district of Gmina Zduńska Wola, within Zduńska Wola County, Łódź Voivodeship, in central Poland.

In the years 1954–1961 the village belonged to and was the seat of the authorities of the Annopole gmina, after its abolition within the Korczew gmina. In the years 1975–1998 the town administratively belonged to the Sieradz Voivodeship.
