= Mostki, Łódź Voivodeship =

Mostki
- Village
- Location within Poland
- Coordinates: 51°38′40″N 18°58′50″E
- Country: Poland
- Voivodeship: Łódź
- County: Zduńska Wola
- Gmina: Zduńska Wola
- Vehicle registration: EZD

Mostki [ˈmɔstki] is a village in the administrative district of Gmina Zduńska Wola, within Zduńska Wola County, Łódź Voivodeship, in central Poland.
