= Mariinsky Girls' Gymnasium (Shusha) =

- Mariinski Qadın Gimnaziyası (Şuşa) (Azerbaijani)
- Location: Azerbaijan

Site notes
- Area: Shusha

Mariinsky Girls' Gymnasium was founded on October 26, 1875, by the Shusha Charitable Society and operated as a girls' school in Shusha. The school provided education to girls regardless of their religious beliefs or ethnicity.

The curriculum included reading and writing, calligraphy, drawing, geography, history, and mapping, including the general geography, history, and map of the Shusha district and the Russian Empire. The education at the school was fee-based, but the impoverished were exempted from tuition fees. Additional education included the study of French and German languages, and music. Gymnastics, depending on the parents' wishes, was conducted free of charge. The Russian language was taught based on Konstantin Ushinsky's "Native Language," and accounting issues were based on Vasili Yevtushensky's book "Accounting Matters." The Shusha Mariinsky Girls' School was transformed into a four-class gymnasium in 1894. In 1901, seven out of the students receiving education here were Azerbaijani.

== Building ==
After the Soviet occupation, the building continued to function as a boarding school.

After Azerbaijan restored its independence, the mosque was included in the list of local significant immovable historical and cultural monuments by the decision No. 132 of the Cabinet of Ministers of the Republic of Azerbaijan on August 2, 2001.

== See also ==
- Shusha Realni School
- Mariinsky Girls' Gymnasiums
