= Gmina Szadek =

Gmina Szadek Szadek Commune
- Gmina
- Flag Coat of arms
- Interactive map of Gmina Szadek
- Coordinates (Szadek): 51°42′N 18°59′E
- Country: Poland
- Voivodeship: Łódź
- County: Zduńska Wola
- Seat: Szadek

Area
  - Total: 151.96 km^{2} (58.67 sq mi)

Population (2006)
  - Total: 7,350
  - Density: 48.4/km^{2} (125/sq mi)
  - Urban: 2,007
  - Rural: 5,343
- Website: http://www.szadek.net

Gmina Szadek is an urban-rural gmina (administrative district) in Zduńska Wola County, Łódź Voivodeship, in central Poland. Its seat is the town of Szadek, which lies approximately 12 kilometres (7 mi) north of Zduńska Wola and 35 km (22 mi) west of the regional capital Łódź.

The gmina covers an area of 151.96 square kilometres (58.7 sq mi), and as of 2006 its total population is 7,350 (out of which the population of Szadek amounts to 2,007, and the population of the rural part of the gmina is 5,343).

== Villages ==
Apart from the town of Szadek, Gmina Szadek contains the villages and settlements of Antonin, Boczki, Borki Prusinowskie, Brondy, Choszczewo, Czarny Las, Dziadkowice, Górna Wola, Góry Prusinowskie, Grzybów, Jamno, Karczówek, Kobyla Miejska, Kotlinki, Kotliny, Krokocice, Lichawa, Łobudzice, Nowy Kromolin, Ogrodzim, Piaski, Prusinowice, Przatów Dolny, Przatów Górny, Reduchów, Rzepiszew, Sikucin, Stary Kromolin, Szadkowice, Tarnówka, Wielka Wieś, Wilamów, Wola Krokocka, Wola Łobudzka and Wola Przatowska.

== Neighbouring gminas ==
Gmina Szadek is bordered by the gminas of Łask, Warta, Wodzierady, Zadzim and Zduńska Wola.
