= Anna Volkova =

19th-century Russian chemist

Anna Feodorovna Volkova
- Died: 1876
- Occupation: Organic chemist
- Known for: Discovery of the structure of toluene sulfonic acids

Anna Feodorovna Volkova (Russian: Анна Федоровна Волкова; died 1876) was a Russian chemist known for her work in organic chemistry. Volkova was the first chemist to prepare pure ortho-toluene sulfonic acid, its acyl chloride, and its amide (1870). She was also the first chemist to synthesize para-tricresyl phosphate from para-cresol, a component of plasticizer. Volkova was the first woman to receive a diploma in chemistry (1870), the first woman in the world to publish scientific work in chemistry, and the first woman to be a member of the Russian Chemical Society.

== Biography ==
Since 1869, Volkova worked in the laboratory of Alexander Nikolayevich Engelhardt at the St. Petersburg Forestry Institute; since 1870, in the laboratory of P. A. Kochube. She attended D. I. Mendeleev's classes through the St. Petersburg public courses.

In 1870, Volkova published an article where she first described the production of pure ortho-toluene sulfonic acid, its acyl chloride and amide; later, her discovery of the acyl chloride and amide was used as the basis for the production of saccharine.

By reacting toluene sulfonic acids with the base, Volkova obtained the corresponding cresols, thereby facilitating the sulfonic acids discovery. Volkova was the first to synthesize para-tricresyl phosphate from para-cresol, which is currently used as a plasticizer component for plastics.

Between 1870 and 1873, Volkova published approximately two dozen articles in the Russian Chemical Society journal on the amides of aromatic sulfonic acids and some of their derivatives.

In 1871, Volkova was the chair of a chemistry session and presented two papers at the Third Congress of Russian Naturalists in Kyiv. Compounds Volkova synthesized were among the new materials prepared by Russian chemists, which were exhibited at the World Industrial Exhibition in London in 1876.

Despite a very short career, ended by poverty-related illness and premature death in 1876, Volkova carried out a remarkable amount of synthetic work and was highly regarded by scientific peers.

== Scientific achievements ==
- Obtained in pure form ortho-toluene sulfonic acid, its acid chloride, and its amide (1870);
- Synthesized para-tricresyl phosphate from para-cresol;
- Discovered the structure of toluene sulfonic acids;
- Discovered that substitution of the hydrogen atom of the ammonia residue in the amides of sulfonic acids with an acid residue (e.g., the residue of benzoic acid) produces amide derivatives that show all the reactions of acids, as well as obtaining the corresponding acyl chlorides and amides.

== Memory ==
The Volkova crater on Venus is named in honor of the scientist.

== See also ==
- Timeline of women in science
- Julia Lermontova
- Nadezhda Ziber-Shumova
