= Laskowiec, Łódź Voivodeship =

Laskowiec
- Village
- Location within Poland
- Coordinates: 51°40′28″N 18°49′35″E
- Country: Poland
- Voivodeship: Łódź
- County: Zduńska Wola
- Gmina: Zduńska Wola
- Population: 40

Laskowiec [lasˈkɔvjɛt͡s] is a village in the administrative district of Gmina Zduńska Wola, within Zduńska Wola County, Łódź Voivodeship, in central Poland.
