= Gmina Zduńska Wola =

Gmina Zduńska Wola Zduńska Wola Commune
- Gmina
- Flag Coat of arms
- Interactive map of Gmina Zduńska Wola
- Coordinates (Zduńska Wola): 51°36′N 18°58′E
- Country: Poland
- Voivodeship: Łódź
- County: Zduńska Wola
- Seat: Zduńska Wola

Area
  - Total: 111.54 km^{2} (43.07 sq mi)

Population (2006)
  - Total: 11,256
  - Density: 100.91/km^{2} (261.37/sq mi)
- Website: http://www.ugzw.com.pl/

Gmina Zduńska Wola is a rural gmina (administrative district) in Zduńska Wola County, Łódź Voivodeship, in central Poland. Its seat is the town of Zduńska Wola, although the town is not part of the territory of the gmina.

The gmina covers an area of 111.54 square kilometres (43.1 sq mi), and as of 2006 its total population is 11,256.

The gmina contains part of the protected area called Warta-Widawka Landscape Park.

== Villages ==
Gmina Zduńska Wola contains the villages and settlements of Andrzejów, Annopole Nowe, Annopole Stare, Beniaminów, Biały Ług, Czechy, Dionizów, Gajewniki, Gajewniki-Kolonia, Henryków, Izabelów, Izabelów Mały, Janiszewice, Karolew, Karsznice, Kęszyce, Kłady, Korczew, Krobanów, Krobanówek, Laskowiec, Maciejów, Michałów, Mostki, Nowe Rębieskie, Ochraniew, Ogrodzisko, Opiesin, Ostrówek, Piaski, Polków, Poręby, Pratków, Rębieskie, Rębieskie-Kolonia, Suchoczasy, Tymienice, Wiktorów, Wojsławice, Wólka Wojsławska, Wymysłów, Zamłynie and Zborowskie.

== Neighbouring gminas ==
Gmina Zduńska Wola is bordered by the gminas of Łask, Sędziejowice, Sieradz, Szadek, Warta and Zapolice.
