= Marceli Nencki =

Polish chemist (1847–1901)

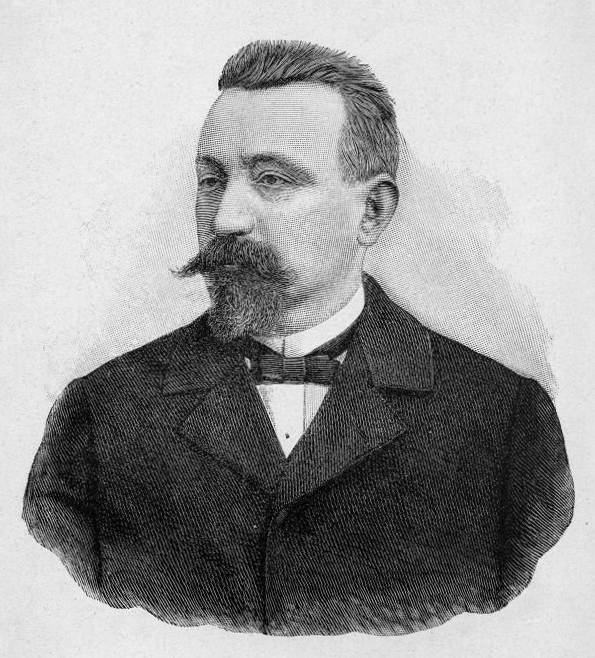
Marceli Nencki.

Wilhelm Marceli Nencki (15 January 1847 in Boczki, Zduńska Wola County – 14 October 1901 in Saint Petersburg) was a Polish chemist and medical doctor who lived in Congress Poland and other parts of the Russian Empire.

== Work ==
Nencki's main scientific interest concentrated on urea synthesis, the chemistry of purines and biological oxidation of aromatic compounds. He was also interested in the structure of proteins, enzymatic processes in the intestine and bacterial biochemistry. One of his achievements was for example demonstration that urea is formed in the organism from amino acids rather than being preformed on a protein molecule and that it is accompanied by binding of carbon dioxide.

He proposed that the synthesis of fatty acids proceeds stepwise, by a gradual condensation of two-carbon-atom fragments and that oxidation of fatty acids occurs by splitting into two-carbon units.

In 1877 while working at the University of Berne he discovered rhodanine via a reaction between ammonium rhodanide (in modern chemistry ammonium thiocyanate) and chloroacetic acid in water.

Among Nencki's greatest achievements was his study on the chemical structure of haemoglobin. He identified haemopyrrole among degradation products of haemoglobin and showed its identity with one of the products obtained by Leon Marchlewski from chlorophyll.

He was the first to rigorously analyze the cause of smell in urine following eating asparagus, which he attributed to methanethiol. He made Phenyl salicylate or salol in 1886, and introduced it as a mild intestinal antiseptic (which it is not) . The "salol principle" (or "nencki principle" or "salol nencki principle" ...) is used to design drugs .

== See also ==
- Nencki Institute of Experimental Biology of the Polish Academy of Sciences
