= Mariinsky Girls' Gymnasium (St. Petersburg) =

Mariinskaya Women's Gymnasium
- Мариинская женская гимназия
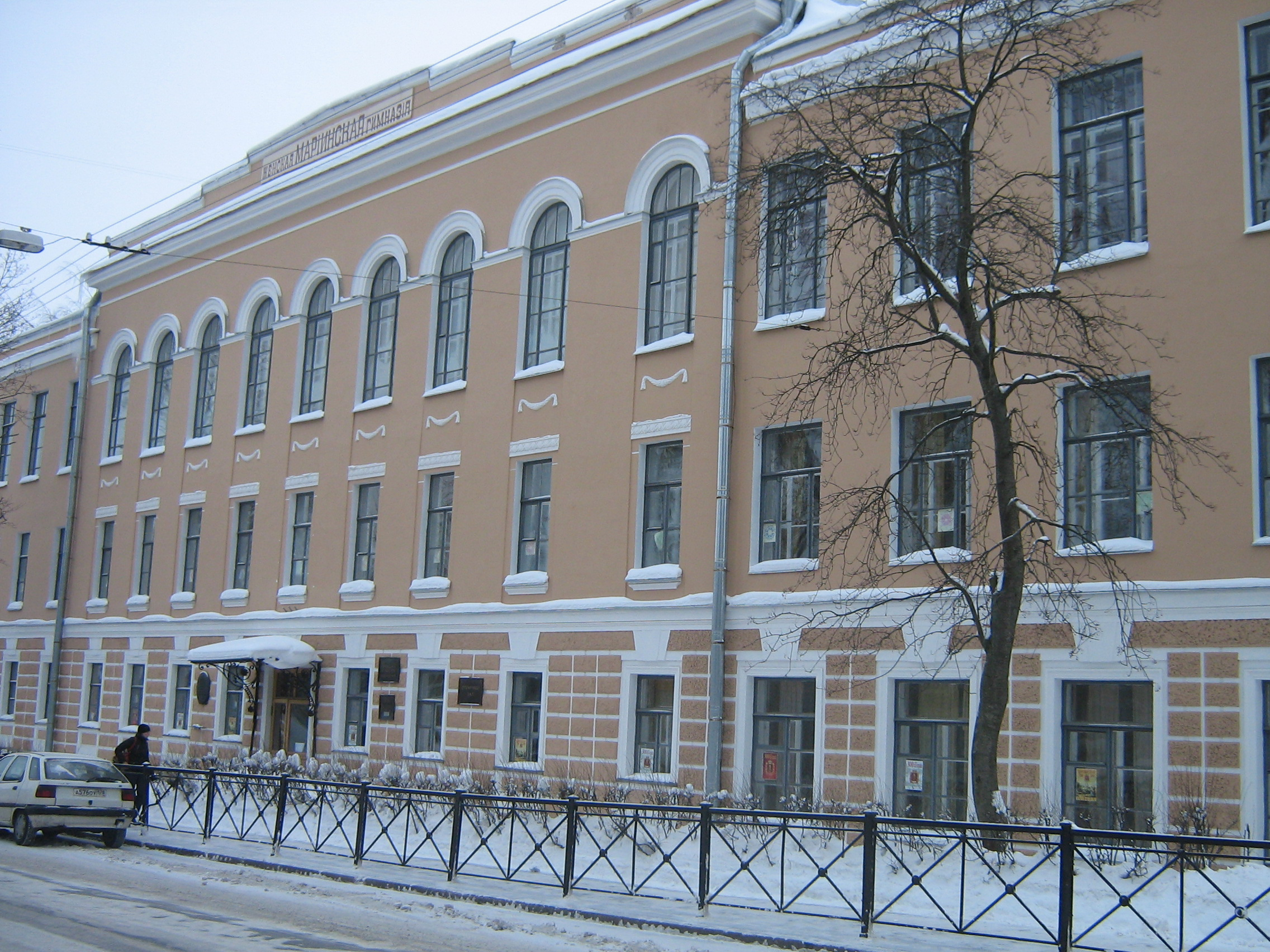
- Interactive map of the Mariinskaya Women's Gymnasium area

General information
- Architectural style: Eclecticism
- Location: Pushkin, 17 Leontyevskaya Street
- Coordinates: 59°43′10″N 30°24′13″E
- Construction started: 1844
- Completed: 1845

Design and construction
- Architects: A. F. Vidov, G.D. Grimm
- Other designers: D. E. Efimov

Mariinskaya Women's Gymnasium is an historic building in Pushkin, Saint Petersburg. This building housed one of the Mariinsky Girls' Gymnasiums.

The building was erected as a government office between 1844 and 1845. It was converted to a school for women in 1865. In the 20th century, the building served as a labor school, then a music school and finally an arts academy. It is an object of cultural heritage.

== History ==
In 1844 or 1845, Mariinskaya was constructed to house the Office of the Chief Executive of the palace boards and Tsarskoe Selo. It was the project of architect D.E. Efimov. When the office was abolished in 1865, the building was redeveloped into a girl's gymnasium The redevelopment was conducted by the architect A. F. Vidov, and a year later the gymnasium moved to a new building. In 1874 the building was expanded to include a new 7th grade gymnasium.

Between 1906 and 1907, a third floor was added. The architect was G. D. Grima, the civil engineer V. A. Lipavsky. A. A. Akhmatova (Gorenko) studied in the gymnasium during the period 1900-1905.

After the October Revolution, the gymnasium became the 2nd Detskoselskaya Soviet labor school. Between 1922 and 1924. Daniil Kharms (Yuvachev) was a student there.

In later years, the building housed a music school, now the Tsarskoye Selo Academy of Arts named after Akhmatova. In 2010 a new gymnasium building was added.

== Architecture ==
The original finish of the Efimov project was preserved on the facade of the first floor, includes a ribbon rust, fan-shaped castle stones. In general, the repeatedly changing facade is an integral composition, in the center of which are elongated semicircular windows of the third floor. The building is completed by the attic.

== Literature ==
- Семенова Г. В. (2009). Царское Село: знакомое и незнакомое. М.: Центрполиграф. pp. 389–391. ISBN 978-5-9524-4249-8.

== Sources ==
- "Леонтьевская 17. Мариинская женская гимназия". Энциклопедия Царского Села. Archived from the original on 2018-07-15.
- "Здание канцелярии Главноуправляющего - Мариинская гимназия - Детская музыкальная школа". citywalls.ru.
