= Phenyl salicylate =

- Skeletal formula

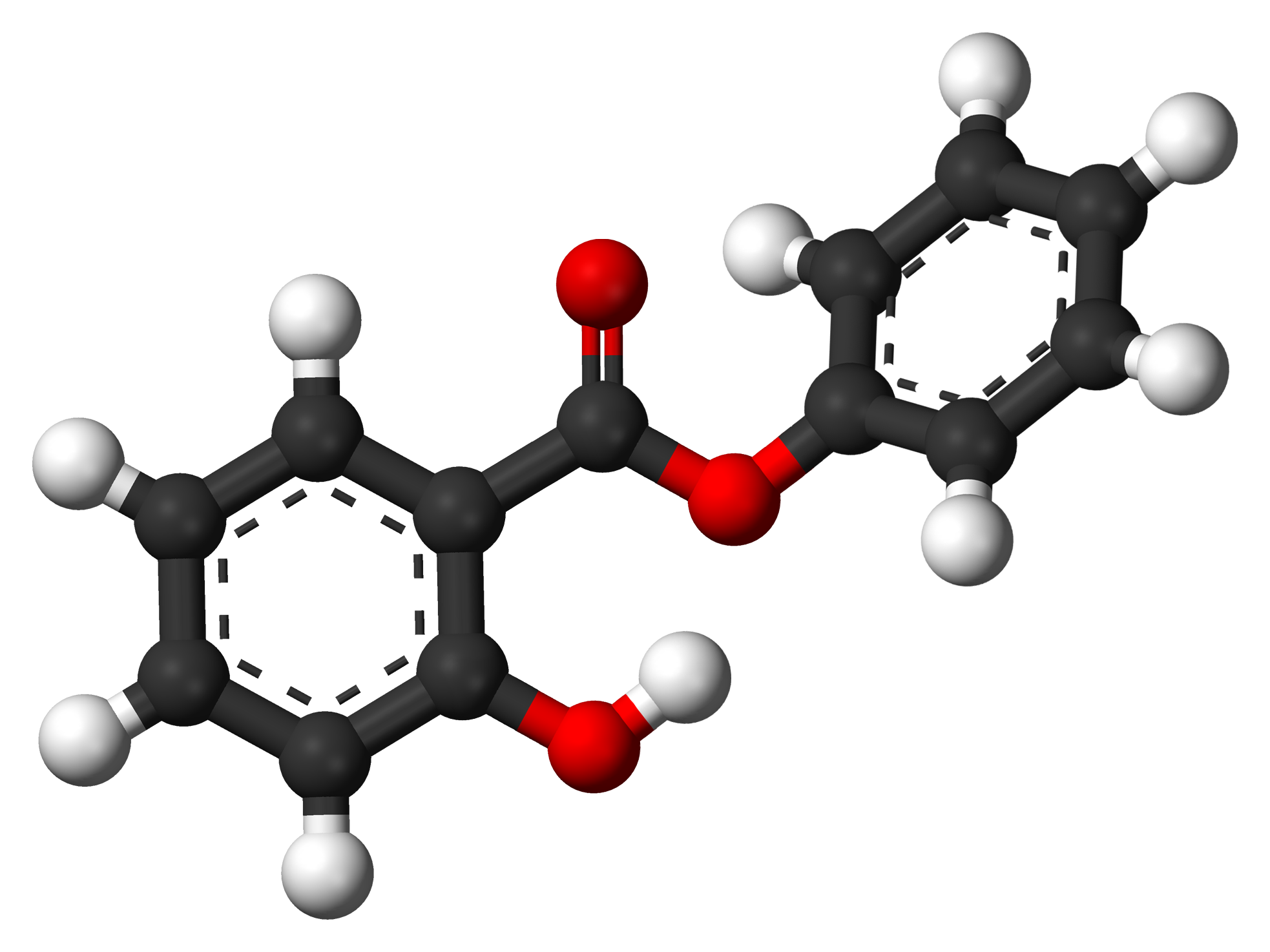
- Ball-and-stick model

Names
- Preferred IUPAC name Phenyl 2-hydroxybenzoate
- Other names Salol

Identifiers
CAS Number	118-55-8
3D model (JSmol)	Interactive image
ChEBI	CHEBI:34918
ChEMBL	ChEMBL1339216
ChemSpider	8058
ECHA InfoCard	100.003.873
EC Number	204-259-2
KEGG	C14163
MeSH	C026041
PubChem CID	8361
UNII	28A37T47QO
CompTox Dashboard (EPA)	DTXSID6021957
- InChI: InChI=1S/C13H10O3/c14-12-9-5-4-8-11(12)13(15)16-10-6-2-1-3-7-10/h1-9,14H Key: ZQBAKBUEJOMQEX-UHFFFAOYSA-N; InChI=1/C13H10O3/c14-12-9-5-4-8-11(12)13(15)16-10-6-2-1-3-7-10/h1-9,14H Key: ZQBAKBUEJOMQEX-UHFFFAOYAI
- SMILES: O=C(Oc2ccccc2)c1c(O)cccc1

Properties
Chemical formula	C_{13}H_{10}O_{3}
Molar mass	214.22 g/mol
Appearance	White solid
Density	1.25 g/cm^{3}
Melting point	41.5 °C (106.7 °F; 314.6 K)
Boiling point	173 °C (343 °F; 446 K) at 12 mmHg
Solubility in water	1 g/6670 mL
Magnetic susceptibility (χ)	−123.2·10^{−6} cm^{3}/mol
Refractive index (n_{D})	1.615

Pharmacology
ATC code	G04BX12 (WHO)

Hazards
- GHS labelling
Pictograms	(GHS07: Exclamation mark)
Signal word	Warning
Hazard statements	H315, H319, H335
Precautionary statements	P261, P264, P264+P265, P271, P280, P302+P352, P304+P340, P305+P351+P338, P319, P321, P332+P317, P337+P317, P362+P364, P403+P233, P405, P501
Flash point	137.3 °C (279.1 °F; 410.4 K)
- Except where otherwise noted, data are given for materials in their standard state (at 25 °C [77 °F], 100 kPa). verify (what is ?) Infobox references

Phenyl salicylate, or salol, is the organic compound with the formula C_{6}H_{5}O_{2}C_{6}H_{4}OH. It is a white solid. It is occasionally used in sunscreens and as an antiseptic.

== Production and reactions ==
The title compound was synthesized first in 1883 by the Polish chemist and doctor Marceli Nencki (who didn't publish his findings) and then independently in 1885 by the German chemist Richard Seifert (de) (1861–1919) (who did publish his findings). It is synthesized by heating salicylic acid with phenol in the presence of phosphoryl chloride. It also arises from heating salicylic acid:

2 HOC_{6}H_{4}CO_{2}H → C_{6}H_{5}O_{2}C_{6}H_{4}OH + CO_{2} + H_{2}O

The conversion entails dehydration and decarboxylation. Heating phenyl salicylate in turn gives xanthone.

2 C_{6}H_{5}O_{2}C_{6}H_{4}OH → 2 C_{6}H_{5}OH + O[C_{6}H_{4}]_{2}CO + CO_{2}

In this conversion, phenol is produced as well as carbon dioxide.

== Salol reaction ==
In the salol reaction, phenyl salicylate reacts with o-toluidine in 1,2,4-trichlorobenzene at elevated temperatures to the corresponding amide o-salicylotoluide. Salicylamides are a type of drug.

== Medical ==
It has been used as an antiseptic based on the antibacterial activity upon hydrolysis in the small intestine.

It acts as a mild analgesic.

== History ==
The Swiss physician Hermann Sahli (sometimes spelled "Saly") (1856–1933) sought a substitute for sodium salicylate, which was used as a treatment for rheumatoid arthritis but which wasn't tolerated by some patients. So Dr. Sahli asked the Polish chemist and doctor Marceli Nencki of Bern, Switzerland, if he knew of a salicylate compound that lacked sodium salicylate's side effects. Nencki recommended phenyl salicylate, which he had synthesized circa 1883. While Nencki had been investigating how phenyl salicylate behaved in the body, he hadn't published his findings. Meanwhile, the German chemist Richard Seifert (de) (1861–1919), a student of the German chemist Rudolf Wilhelm Schmitt (de) (1830–1898), independently synthesized phenyl salicylate in 1885. In 1885, Seifert accepted a position at the Heyden chemical corporation (de) of Radebeul, Germany, which manufactured salicylic acid. The United States granted to Nencki and Seifert a patent for the production of phenyl salicylate, whereas Germany granted a patent for its production to Nencki and the Heyden corporation. The Heyden company subsequently sold phenyl salicylate as a pharmaceutical, under the commercial name "Salol", a contraction of "SALicylate of phenOL". Among other applications, Salol was used as an orally administered antiseptic for the small intestine, where the compound is hydrolyzed into salicylic acid and phenol.

== See also ==
Phenyl salicylate is used in school laboratory demonstrations on how cooling rates affect crystal size in igneous rocks, and can be used to demonstrate seed crystal selectiveness.
