= Zduńska Wola County =

Zduńska Wola County Powiat zduńskowolski
- County
- Flag Coat of arms

- Location within the voivodeship

- Division into gminas
- Coordinates (Zduńska Wola): 51°36′N 18°58′E
- Country: Poland
- Voivodeship: Łódź
- Seat: Zduńska Wola
- Gminas: Total 4 (incl. 1 urban): Zduńska Wola; Gmina Szadek; Gmina Zapolice; Gmina Zduńska Wola

Area
  - Total: 369.19 km^{2} (142.55 sq mi)

Population (2006)
  - Total: 67,704
  - Density: 183.39/km^{2} (474.97/sq mi)
  - Urban: 46,377
  - Rural: 21,327
- Car plates: EZD
- Website: www.powiatzdunskowolski.pl

Zduńska Wola County (Polish: powiat zduńskowolski) is a unit of territorial administration and local government (powiat) in Łódź Voivodeship, central Poland. It came into being on 1 January 1999 as a result of the Polish local government reforms passed in 1998. Its administrative seat and largest town is Zduńska Wola, which lies 41 kilometres (25 mi) south-west of the regional capital Łódź. The only other town in the county is Szadek, lying 12 km (7 mi) north of Zduńska Wola.

The county covers an area of 369.19 square kilometres (142.5 sq mi). As of 2006 its total population is 67,704, out of which the population of Zduńska Wola is 44,370, that of Szadek is 2,007, and the rural population is 21,327.

== Neighbouring counties ==
Zduńska Wola County is bordered by Poddębice County to the north, Łask County to the east and Sieradz County to the west.

== Administrative divisions ==
The county is subdivided into four gminas (one urban, one urban-rural and two rural). These are listed in the following table, in descending order of population.

Gmina	Type	Area (km^{2})	Population (2006)	Seat
Zduńska Wola	urban	24.6	44,370	
Gmina Zduńska Wola	rural	111.5	11,256	Zduńska Wola *
Gmina Szadek	urban-rural	152.0	7,350	Szadek
Gmina Zapolice	rural	81.1	4,728	Zapolice
* seat not part of the gmina
