= Rantalinna Manor =

Coordinates: 61.315441°N 28.775005°E

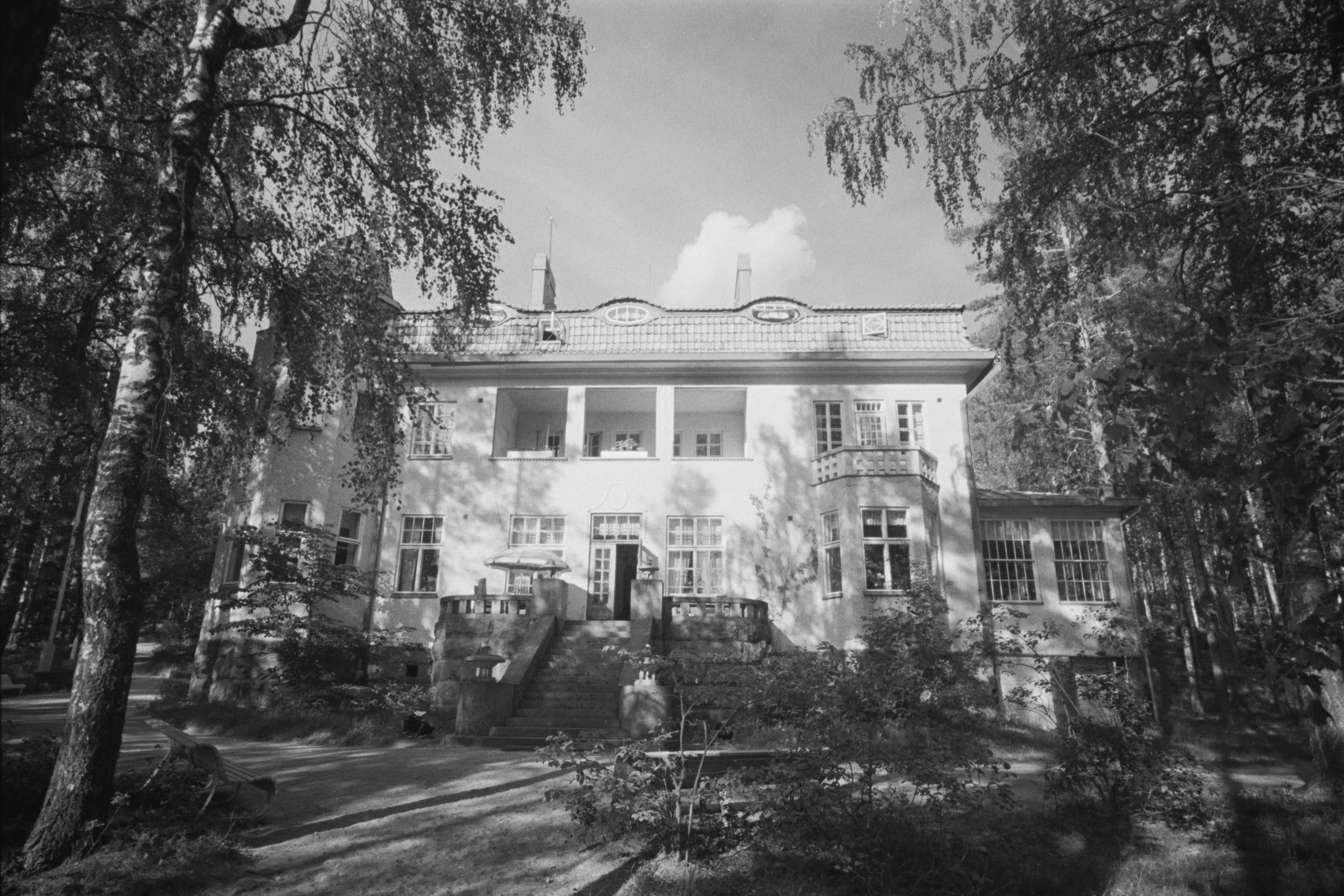
Rantalinna

Rantalinna Manor is a historic manor house in the municipality of Ruokolahti, Finland. It is located at the banks of the Saimaa lake. The distance to Helsinki is 260 kilometres and to Saint Petersburg 250 kilometres.

== History ==
The mansion was constructed for judge Fritz Wiik in 1912. The property was sold in 1915 to prince Alexander of Oldenburg, member of the imperial Romanov family. He resided in the manor until 1929, together with his wife Princess Eugenia of Leuchtenberg. Both were well known for their philanthropy. Initially, they only spent the summer in the house. But after the Russian Revolution they used the mansion throughout the whole year, hoping to return to Saint Petersburg one day, which never happened. When living in Rantalinna, they retained a staff of 36 persons, two Rolls-Royce cars and a ship. Before World War I, the Ramon Palace in south western Russia was one of their summer residences.

In 1929, the manor was sold to the Association of Finnish Conductors, who used the house as holiday home for their staff. Since the 1990s, the manor is used as hotel.

== Architecture and design ==
The mansion is designed in Art Nouveau or Jugendstil style. The interiors are restored to its original appearance and still contain furniture of the princely times.

== Bibliography ==
- K. J. Kahila, Lepokoti Rantalinna 1928-1958. Valtionrautateiden konduktööriyhdistys. Helsinki 1957.
- Olli Vuori, Kesähuvilan omistus Suomessa. Kartoittava tutkimus kesäasutuksesta ja huvilanomistuksesta taloudellisena ilmiönä. Turun Yliopiston julkaisuja. Sarja C Osa 3. Turku 1966.
- Kalevi Heitto, Imatran seudun hoveja ja kartanoita. Imatra 1989.
