= Ferdinand Loginovich Miller =

Franz-Ferdinand Loginovich Miller
- Born: December 9, 1832
- Died: October 24, 1900 (aged 67); Saint Petersburg
- Education: Imperial Academy of Arts
- Occupation: Architect
- Buildings: Oranienbaum I Railway Station; Ramon Palace; Chapel of Kazan Icon of the Mother of God

Franz-Ferdinand Loginovich Miller (1832–1900) was a Russian architect, who designed the Oraniebaum I railway station in Lomonosov, Russia in 1864, Ramon Palace, and the Chapel of Kazan Icon of the Mother of God in Ilzho, Luzhsky District, Leningrad Oblast in 1895

He attended the Imperial Academy of Arts from 1849, where in December 1853 he was awarded 2nd prize for a design of "A Country House", and in May 1856, was awarded with 1st prize for a design of "The Exchange Building". He was awarded the title of Free Artist in 1861. One of his earlier designs was an extension to the Krasnogorsky House (36 Ligovsky Avenue) in 1858. Miller designed a rebuild of the house of K. K. Feyleisen on 51 Moika Embankment in 1879–1880, with a Fourth floor and a bay window. Miller also designed an apartment building for his brother, K. L. Miller on 2 Yakubovich Street in 1879–1880. The building was decorated with stucco ceilings, oak doors, and oak pannelled walls. Miller also designed the Institute of Experimental Medicine in 1892–1895 for Duke Alexander of Oldenburg.

He is buried in Smolensky Lutheran Cemetery.

Miller resided at 25 Bolshaya Morskaya Street in Saint Petersburg.
