= Duke Peter Alexandrovich of Oldenburg =

Russian duke

Duke Peter Alexandrovich
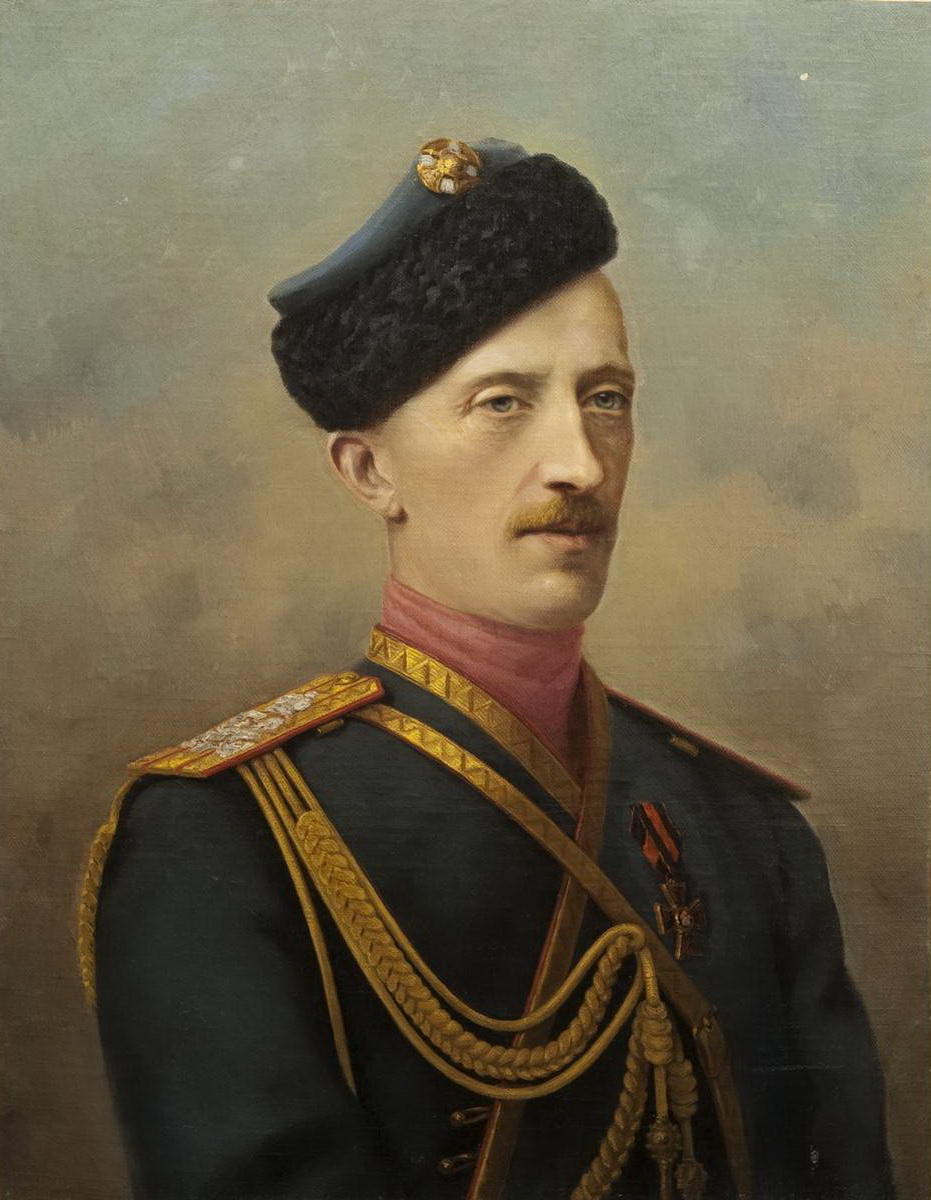
- Portrait, 1908
- Born: 21 November 1868; Oldenburg Palace, Saint Petersburg, Russian Empire
- Died: 11 March 1924 (aged 55); Antibes, France
- Burial: St. Michael the Archangel Church, Cannes
- Spouse: Grand Duchess Olga Alexandrovna of Russia (m. 1901; ann. 1916)
Names
- Peter Friedrich Georg
- House: House of Holstein-Gottorp
- Father: Duke Alexander Petrovich of Oldenburg
- Mother: Princess Eugenia Maximilianovna of Leuchtenberg

Duke Peter Alexandrovich of Oldenburg (21 November 1868 – 11 March 1924) was the first husband of Grand Duchess Olga Alexandrovna of Russia, the youngest sister of Tsar Nicholas II.

== Early life ==
He was born in Saint Petersburg in the Oldenburg Palace (present-day site of Saint-Petersburg State University of Culture and Arts), the only child of Duke Alexander Petrovich of Oldenburg (1844–1932) and Princess Eugenia Maximilianovna of Leuchtenberg (1845–1925). His mother was a granddaughter of Tsar Nicholas I of Russia through Nicholas's daughter, Grand Duchess Maria Nikolayevna, and his father was a great-grandson of Tsar Paul I of Russia through his paternal grandmother Grand Duchess Catherine Pavlovna. He was known by the name of "Petya".

== Marriage ==
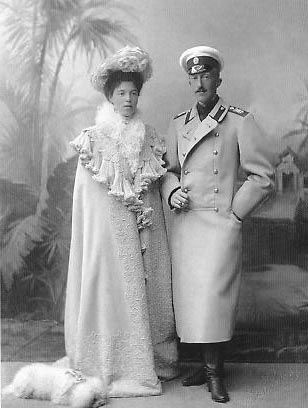
Oldenburg and his wife Olga, 1901

In 1900, he began to escort the 18-year-old Grand Duchess Olga Alexandrovna (1882–1960), the youngest daughter of the late Tsar Alexander III and younger sister to the reigning Tsar Nicholas II, to the theatre and opera. His proposal of marriage the following year came as a surprise to Olga, who later explained, "I was so taken aback that all I could say was 'thank you'". She assumed that Oldenburg was pushed into proposing by his ambitious mother. Perhaps Olga accepted his proposal to gain independence from her mother, or avoid marriage into a foreign court. The marriage was announced in May 1901, and was unexpected by many, as Oldenburg had shown no prior interest in women. The Dowager Empress Maria Feodorovna wrote to her son, Tsar Nicholas II, "I am sure you won't believe what has happened. Olga is engaged to Petya and both are very happy. I had to consent, but it was all done so quickly and unexpectedly that I still cannot believe it." Tsar Nicholas replied to his mother, "...I cannot believe Olga is actually engaged to Petya. They were probably both drunk yesterday. ... We both laughed so much reading your note that we have not recovered yet." A prenuptial agreement drawn up by a committee of the Tsar, the Oldenburg family, and government ministers, promised Olga an annuity of 100,000 rubles from the Tsar, and one million rubles to be deposited in a fund from which she could draw interest.

On 9 August 1901, they were married at Saint Petersburg in a grand ceremony attended by family, government ministers, foreign ambassadors, and courtiers. They honeymooned at the Ramon Palace, country estate of Oldenburg family near Voronezh, but the atmosphere was soured by a quarrel between Oldenburg and his father over gambling. Oldenburg was an inveterate and well-known gambler. The money he coaxed out of his wife was often lost at the table. In the fall of 1901, they traveled on to Biarritz, where a fire at their hotel destroyed many of Oldenburg's uniforms and medals, including a specially commissioned Danish Order of the Elephant from Fabergé. Olga's uncle-by-marriage, England's King Edward VII, lent them a yacht, in which they sailed to Sorrento. On their return to Russia, they moved into a palatial 200-room house at 46 Sergievskaya street, Saint Petersburg, made available to them by the Tsar.

Their marriage remained unconsummated, and Oldenburg was believed by family and friends to be homosexual. Two years after their marriage, Olga met a cavalry officer her own age, Nikolai Kulikovsky, member of Russian-Moldavian Kulikovsky noble family, to whom she was attracted. She confronted Oldenburg and asked for a divorce, which he refused with the qualification that he might reconsider after seven years. However, Oldenburg appointed Kulikovsky as an aide-de-camp, and allowed him to live in the same residence as Oldenburg and the Grand Duchess on Sergievskaya street.

== Annulment ==
In the middle of World War I, after living separately for two years, Oldenburg's marriage to Olga was annulled on 16 October 1916. Olga married Kulikovsky the following month. After the Russian Revolution, Oldenburg and his mother managed to escape Russia, and settled in France.

An acquaintance, Senator A. A. Polovtsev, said Oldenburg "comes across as a sickly person". He was thought to be a hypochondriac, had a slender, delicate build, and preferred indoor activities to sports and outdoor pursuits.

== Death ==
He died, aged 55, in 1924 in exile in Antibes, France, and was buried in the crypt of the Russian Orthodox St. Michael the Archangel Church, Cannes.

== Ancestors ==
Ancestors of Duke Peter Alexandrovich of Oldenburg

8. Duke George of Oldenburg
4. Duke Peter Georgievich of Oldenburg
9. Grand Duchess Catherine Pavlovna of Russia
2. Duke Alexander Petrovich of Oldenburg
10. William, Duke of Nassau
5. Princess Therese of Nassau-Weilburg
11. Princess Louise of Saxe-Hildburghausen
1. Duke Peter Alexandrovich of Oldenburg
12. Eugène de Beauharnais, 1st Duke of Leuchtenberg
6. Prince Maximilian, 3rd Duke of Leuchtenberg
13. Princess Augusta of Bavaria
3. Princess Eugenia Maximilianovna of Leuchtenberg
14. Nicholas I of Russia
7. Grand Duchess Maria Nikolaevna of Russia
15. Princess Charlotte of Prussia

== Sources ==
- Crawford, Donald; Crawford, Rosemary (1997). An Innocent Abroad. New York: Scribner. ISBN 0-684-83430-8
- Phenix, Patricia (1999). Olga Romanov: Russia's Last Grand Duchess. Viking/Penguin. ISBN 0-14-028086-3.
- Vorres, Ian (2001) [1964]. The Last Grand Duchess. Toronto: Key Porter Books. ISBN 1-55263-302-0
