= Institute of Experimental Medicine =

Russian research institute

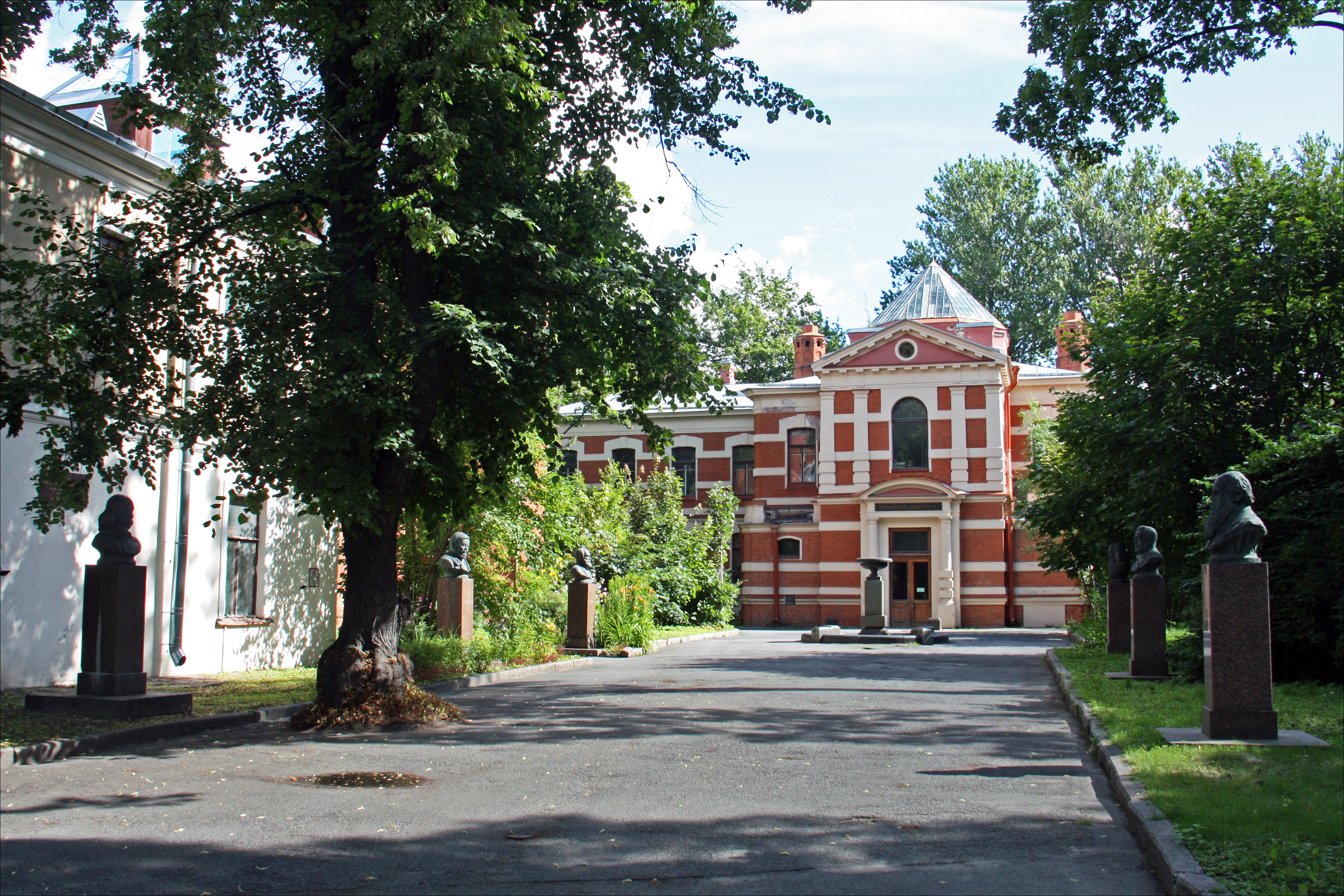
Institute of Experimental Medicine, Chemical Laboratory, 2015

The Institute of Experimental Education in St Petersburg is one of the oldest scientific establishments in Russia. It was founded by Alexander of Oldenburg in 1888 along the lines of Louis Pasteur's Pasteur Institute. The building was built in 1892-1895 by Ferdinand Loginovich Miller, and it was here that Pavlov did much of his groundbreaking physiological research. The portal of the library is decorated with tiles created by Peter Vaulin between 1911 and 1913.

== Departments ==
The institute was divided into eight departments:

- Chemistry headed by M.V.Nentsky
- Epizootiology headed by K.Ya.Gelman
- General Bacteriology headed by Sergei Winogradsky
- Pathologic Anatomy headed by N.V.Uskov
- Physiology headed by Pavlov
- Science Library headed by V.G.Ushakov
- Syphilidology headed by E.F.Shperk
- Vaccination Department headed by V.A.Krayushkin
