= Ramon Palace =

Coordinates: 51°54′29.3″N 39°20′25.6″E

- Дворец Ольденбургских (Рамонь)
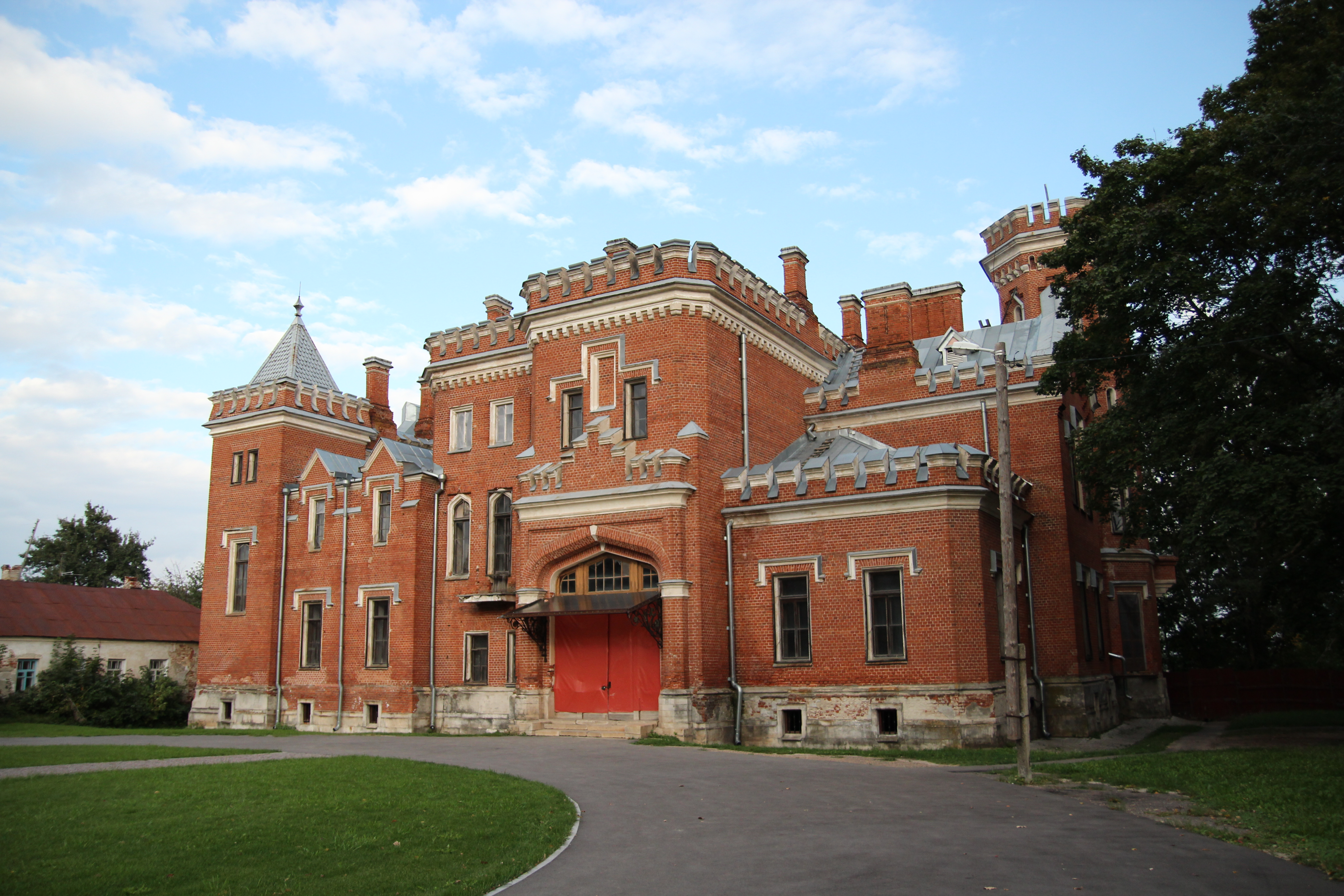
- Alternative names: Princess Oldenburg's Palace

General information
- Location: Russia, Ramon
- Year built: 1883-1887
- Opened: 1883

Ramon Palace, also known as Princess Oldenburg's Palace, is a red-brick neo-Gothic palace in Ramon, Russia. It was built in 1883–87 for Princess Eugenia Maximilianovna of Leuchtenberg and her husband Duke Alexander Petrovich of Oldenburg. It is registered as an object of Russian cultural heritage.

In 1879 Tsar Alexander II gave the estate of Ramon to his niece Princess Eugenia and the Duke of Oldenburg as a wedding gift. In 1883 they commissioned construction of the palace, in red brick, in the style of an English Gothic castle with gatehouse. The architect is usually said to have been Christopher Neysler, but some sources attribute the design to Nicholas Benois, or most likely, Ferdinand Loginovich Miller. The building used "foot bricks" manufactured according to a traditional process involving peasants treading the clay into wood frames for firing.

The building is decorated with wrought iron and the grounds originally had fountains and a menagerie, including bears who were housed in the cellars in winter. The grand staircase leading to the first floor, where there was originally a ballroom, has shallow steps to accommodate the tight skirts then in vogue; Princess Eugenia is thought to have had input into this and other aspects of the interior design. There appears to have been a central heating system of air ducts in the walls, and the Duke's bath was lowered into the cellar through a trapdoor to be filled with hot water.

The palace was completed in 1887. After the marriage of Duke Peter Alexandrovich of Oldenburg, the couple's only son, to Grand Duchess Olga Alexandrovna, the young couple lived at the palace and then built their own home, Olgino, next to it.

In 1902 the palace was damaged by arson in connection with workers' protests. The Oldenburg family went into exile to avoid the Russian Revolution; the estate properties were confiscated by the Bolshevik government in 1917 and the palace was subsequently used as barracks, a school, a hospital, and housing for managers of the nearby factories which had been established by Princess Eugenia.

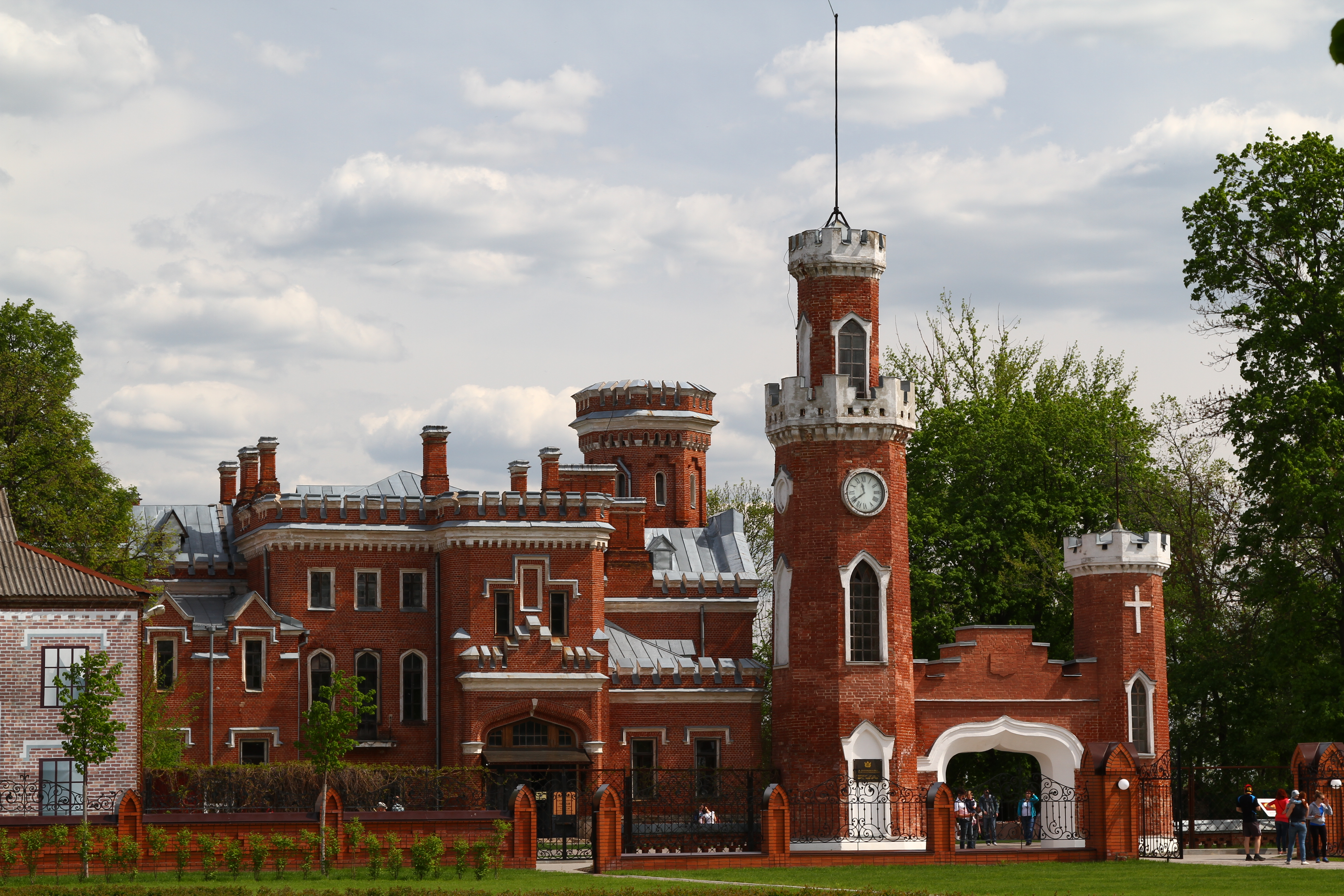
Ramon Palace, gatehouse and front façade

The palace was closed for restoration in the late 1970s but instead fell into disrepair. Some stabilisation took place in 1999–2005, including reinforcement of the main stairway and installation of a snow melting system on the roof, and there were plans to lease it on condition the architecture was preserved, but instead in 2009 a consortium of German architects proposed plans for renovating it, and in 2010 under the sponsorship of Duchess Bibiane of Oldenburg, Mrs. Dorner, a €40 million project financed by German investors was launched to preserve the palace and associated buildings as a museum and build a hotel. During the restoration, a stone was found in the grounds with an inscription confirming that the estate was a royal gift.

The restored grounds reopened in 2013.
