= Princess Eugenia Maximilianovna of Leuchtenberg =

Princess Eugenia Maximilianovna
- Duchess Alexander of Oldenburg
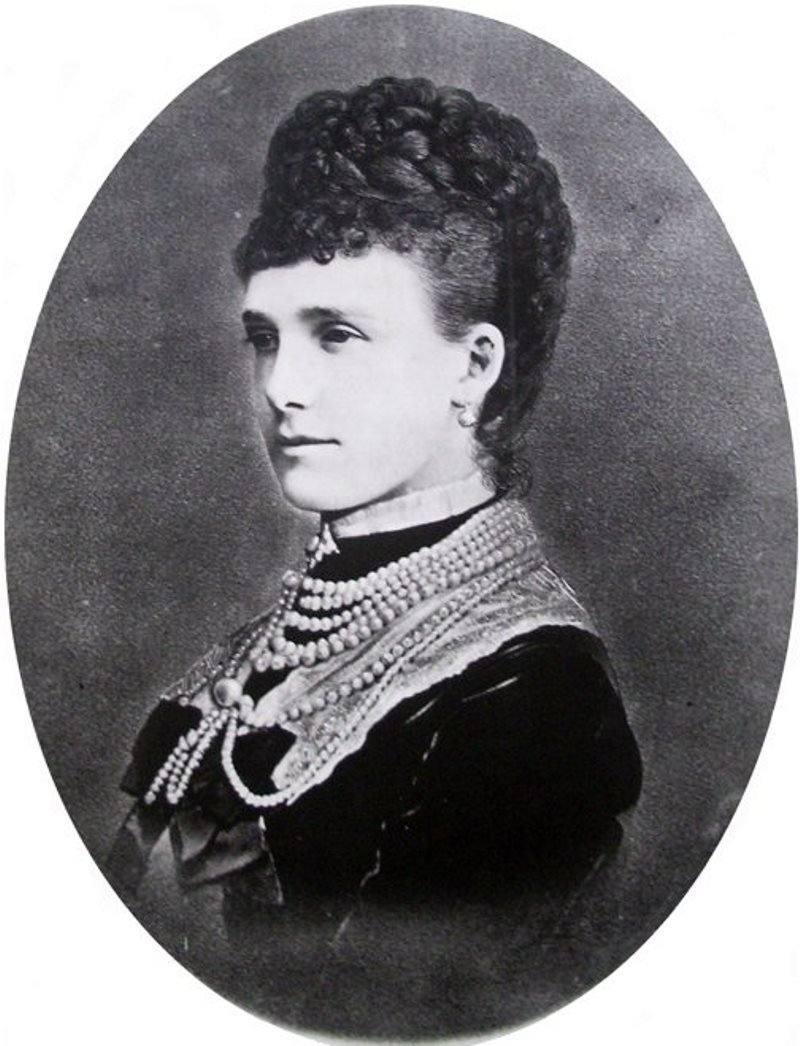
- Eugenia in the 1880s
- Born: 1 April 1845; Mariinskiy Palace, St. Petersburg, Russian Empire
- Died: 4 May 1925 (aged 80); Biarritz, France
- Burial: Cimetière du Sabaou, Biarritz, France
- Spouse: Duke Alexander of Oldenburg (m. 1868)
- Issue: Duke Peter Alexandrovich of Oldenburg
- House: House of Beauharnais (by birth); House of Holstein-Gottorp (by marriage)
- Father: Maximilian de Beauharnais, 3rd Duke of Leuchtenberg
- Mother: Grand Duchess Maria Nikolaevna of Russia
- Religion: Russian Orthodox

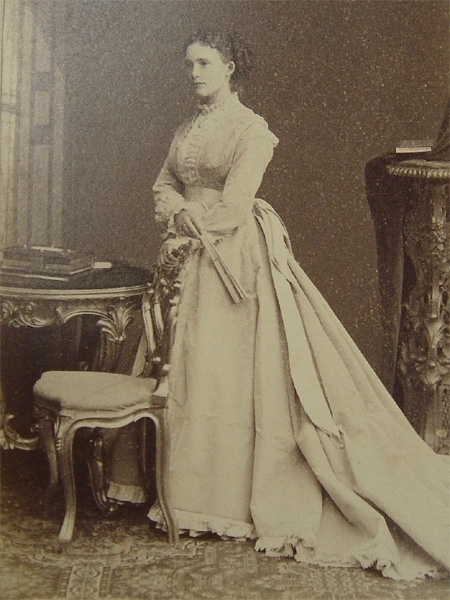
Portrait of Eugenia of Leuchtenberg

Princess Eugenia Maximilianovna of Leuchtenberg (Russian: Евгения Максимилиановна Лейхтенбергская) (1 April 1845 – 4 May 1925) was the daughter of Maximilian de Beauharnais, 3rd Duke of Leuchtenberg and Grand Duchess Maria Nikolaevna of Russia. Although she was a member of the French House of Beauharnais, she was born and raised in her mother's native country, Russia.

In 1868, she married her distant cousin, Duke Alexander of Oldenburg. The couple had an only child, Duke Peter Alexandrovich of Oldenburg. Princess Eugenia and her husband were particularly noted for their extensive philanthropy throughout Russia; so much so in fact that by 1914, a newspaper source could claim that "there [were] probably not two who are so universally beloved as the Duke and Duchess of Oldenburg".

== Early life ==
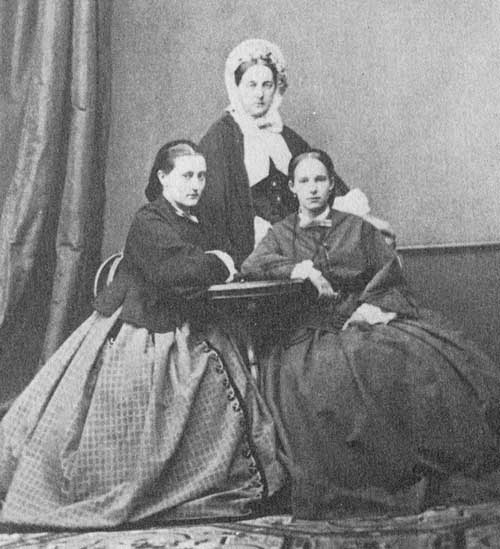
Princess Eugenia (on the right) with her mother and sister Maria.

Princess Eugenia of Leuchtenberg was born on 1 April [O.S. 20 March] 1845 at the Mariinskiy Palace in Saint Petersburg. She was the fourth child and third daughter of Maximilian de Beauharnais, 3rd Duke of Leuchtenberg and his wife, Grand Duchess Maria Nikolaevna of Russia. Eugenia's father, Maximilian, Duke of Leuchtenberg, had traveled to St. Petersburg, eventually winning the hand of Grand Duchess Maria Nikolaevna, Nicholas I's eldest daughter. Maximilian was subsequently bestowed with the style Imperial Highness and given the title Prince Romanowsky. As the daughter of a Russian grand duchess and an ennobled Russian prince, Eugenia and her siblings were always treated as grand dukes and duchesses, bearing the styles Imperial Highness.

Princess Eugenia (She was called Eugenie, the French form of her name, by her family) spent her childhood in the Mariinsky Palace with her siblings. Both of her parents were interested in artistic and scientific endeavors so Eugenia received a better education than most princesses of her time. She studied music, drawing, dancing and languages. As a girl she enjoyed horse-riding. Hunting with horses and riding became hobbies she enjoyed throughout her life.

After their father's death in 1852, Grand Duchess Maria morganatically remarried to Count Grigori Stroganov two years later. As this union was kept secret from her father Emperor Nicholas I (and her brother Emperor Alexander II could not permit the union, preferring instead to feign ignorance), Maria was forced into exile abroad. Alexander felt sympathy for his sister however, and paid special attention to her children from her first marriage, who lived in St. Petersburg without their mother.

Due to her rank, Eugenia often served in various court functions. In 1860 for instance Eugenia accompanied Dowager Empress Alexandra Feodorovna to France, where they were greeted by Napoleon III and Empress Eugenie. In 1866, the princess, Grand Duchess Maria, and other prominent royal figures officially greeted U.S. Ambassador Cassius Clay and the Assistant Secretary of the Navy Gustavus Fox with a lavish banquet; Clay was given the honor of sitting between Eugenia and Grand Duchess Alexandra Iosifovna. Clay and Fox had previously traveled to the country palace of Grand Duchess Maria, where they were officially presented to Princess Eugenia; they ate lunch together, and afterwards the two men journeyed back to St. Petersburg to carry out other visits of state.

== Marriage ==
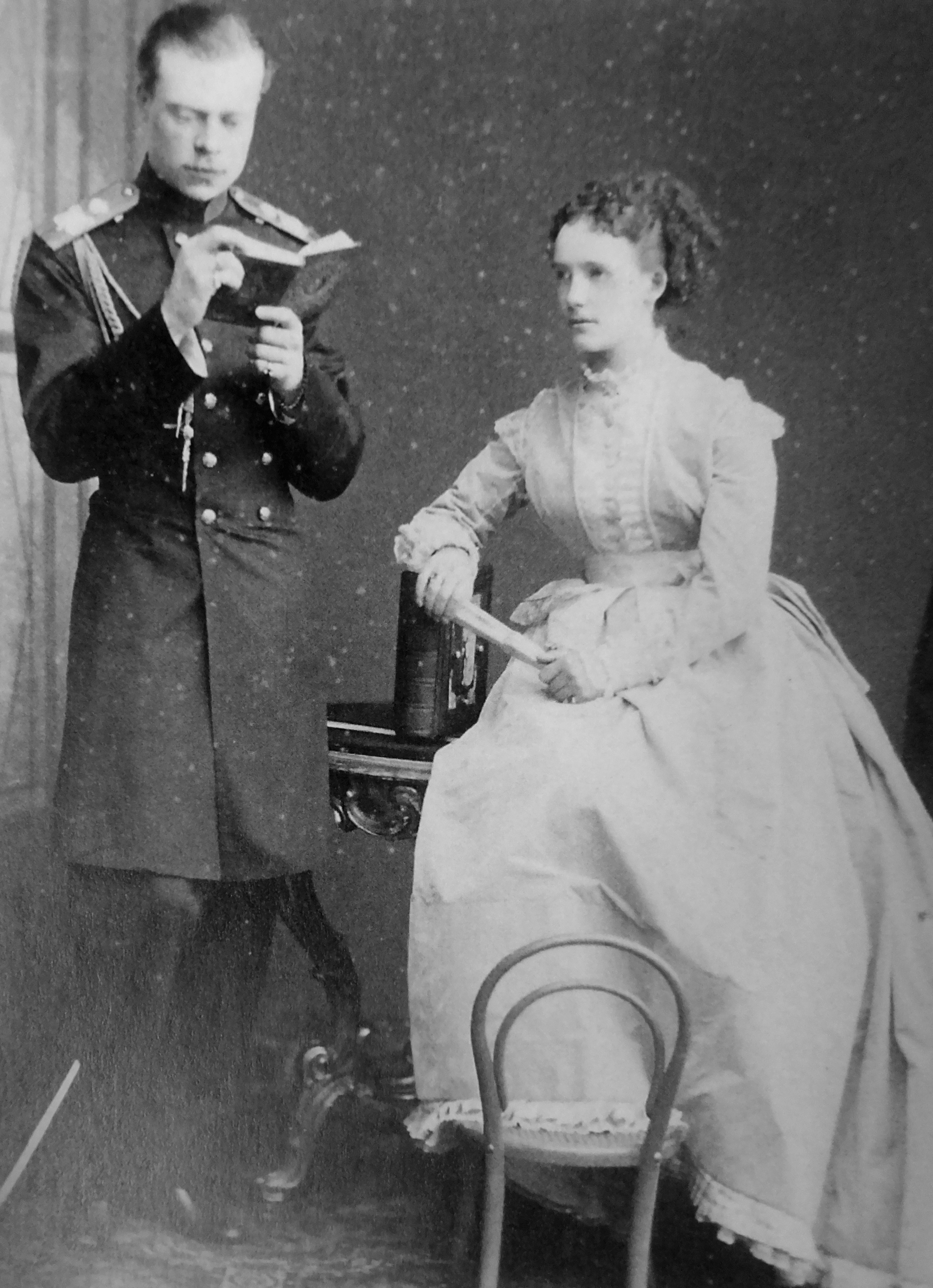
Princess Eugenia Maximilianovna and her husband Alexander Petrovich of Oldenburg

As a young woman, various candidates were put forth as potential husbands. One such possibility was Crown Prince Umberto of Italy. Nothing came of this however, and Umberto later married Princess Margherita of Savoy. There were also planned for Eugenia to marry then Prince Ludwig of Bavaria, the nephew of King Otto of Greece, and have him convert to Eastern Orthodoxy to reassure the Greek people, but the plans came too late to help King Otto.

On 19 January 1868 at the Winter Palace, Eugenia married Duke Alexander Petrovich of Oldenburg, a son of Duke Peter Georgievich of Oldenburg. Alexander's grandfather had married Grand Duchess Catherine Pavlovna, daughter of Paul I of Russia, and their descendants had been raised in Russia ever since and become completely "Russianized", much like Eugenia's own family. Thus despite his German title, Duke Alexander, like his father before him, had grown up entirely in Russia, serving his military service for the czars. He was always considered a part of the Russian imperial family.

The couple had one son, Duke Peter Alexandrovich of Oldenburg (21 November 1868 – 11 March 1924). Eugenia had a long-standing friendship with Empress Maria Feodorovna, and the two helped arrange the marriage of Eugenia's son to Marie's daughter, Grand Duchess Olga Alexandrovna.

=== Ramon estate ===
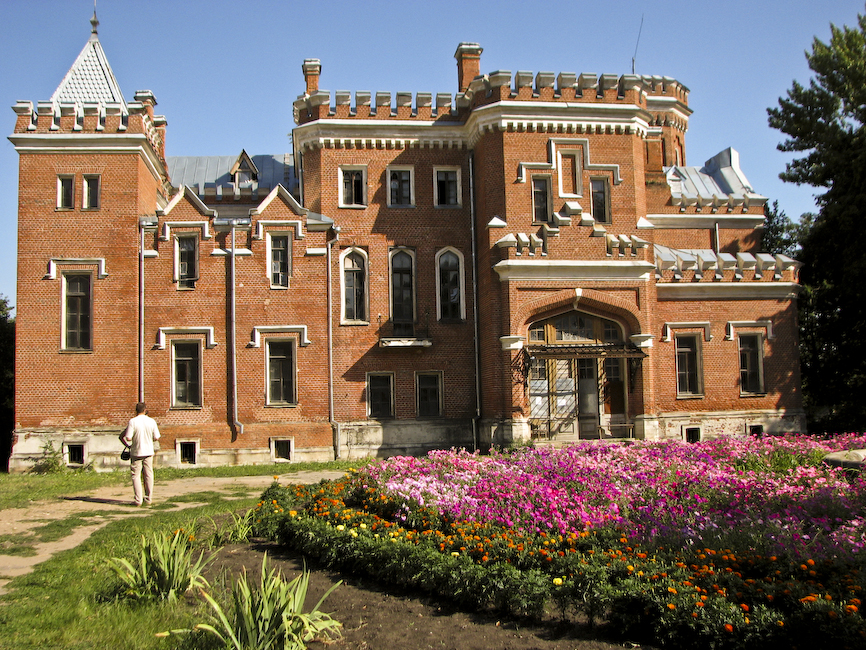
Eugenia's palace in Ramon

As a wedding gift, Eugenia's uncle Alexander II of Russia presented the couple the estate of Ramon, in southwestern Russia. in 1883 the couple hired architect Christopher Neysler to build Ramon Palace, a residence resembling an English castle of Gothic architecture; it was completed four years later. After marrying Grand Duchess Olga Alexandrovna, youngest daughter of Alexander III, in 1901, their only son took residence at the palace, and eventually the couple purchased an adjacent estate to build their own home.

In 1902, a mob of peasants, acting out of labor unrest, attacked and set fire to the palace, causing extensive damage. Fifteen years later, the estate was confiscated by the new Bolshevik regime, and turned into a barracks, school, hospital, and housing for a nearby factory.

== Later life ==
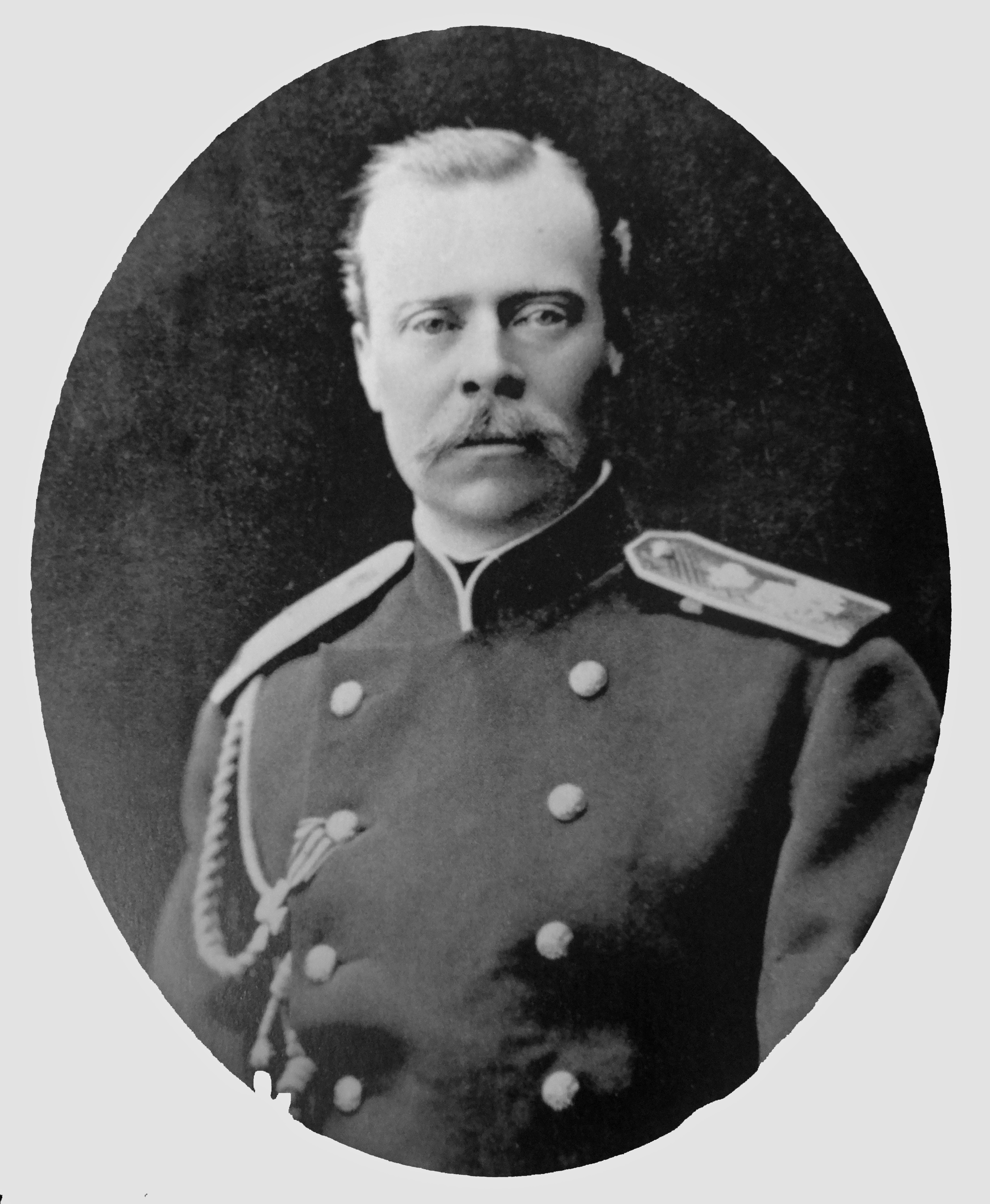
Eugenia's husband Duke Alexander of Oldenburg.

Duke Alexander was one of the richest princes in Russia, not only through his landed and funded property, but also because of the great wealth Eugenia had inherited from her grandfather Nicholas I. Alexander was also third-in-line to the throne of Oldenburg, as Frederick Augustus II, Grand Duke of Oldenburg had only one young son, Hereditary Grand Duke Nikolaus, plus an unmarried brother Duke Georg Ludwig; were they to die before the Grand Duke, Alexander would have become heir presumptive.

=== Throne of Bulgaria ===
Alexander, Prince of Bulgaria abdicated on 7 September 1886, leading to various candidates being advocated by interested nearby nations; the two most concerned were Russia and Germany under the respective governments of Emperor Alexander III and German Chancellor Otto von Bismarck. Duke Alexander was subsequently recommended, at the Russian government's suggestion, for the Bulgarian throne. Not only was he married to a Russian princess and was himself the grandson of a Russian grand duchess, but he also held the positions of Adjutant-General to Emperor Alexander and was the Commanding General of the Imperial Guard. In several desperate attempts to prevent Russia from gaining control of Bulgaria however, the throne was offered to candidates who lacked Russian ties, such as a prince of Denmark or even the king of Romania. In the end, Prince Ferdinand of Saxe-Coburg-Gotha was chosen, becoming Ferdinand I of Bulgaria.

=== Arts and philanthropy ===
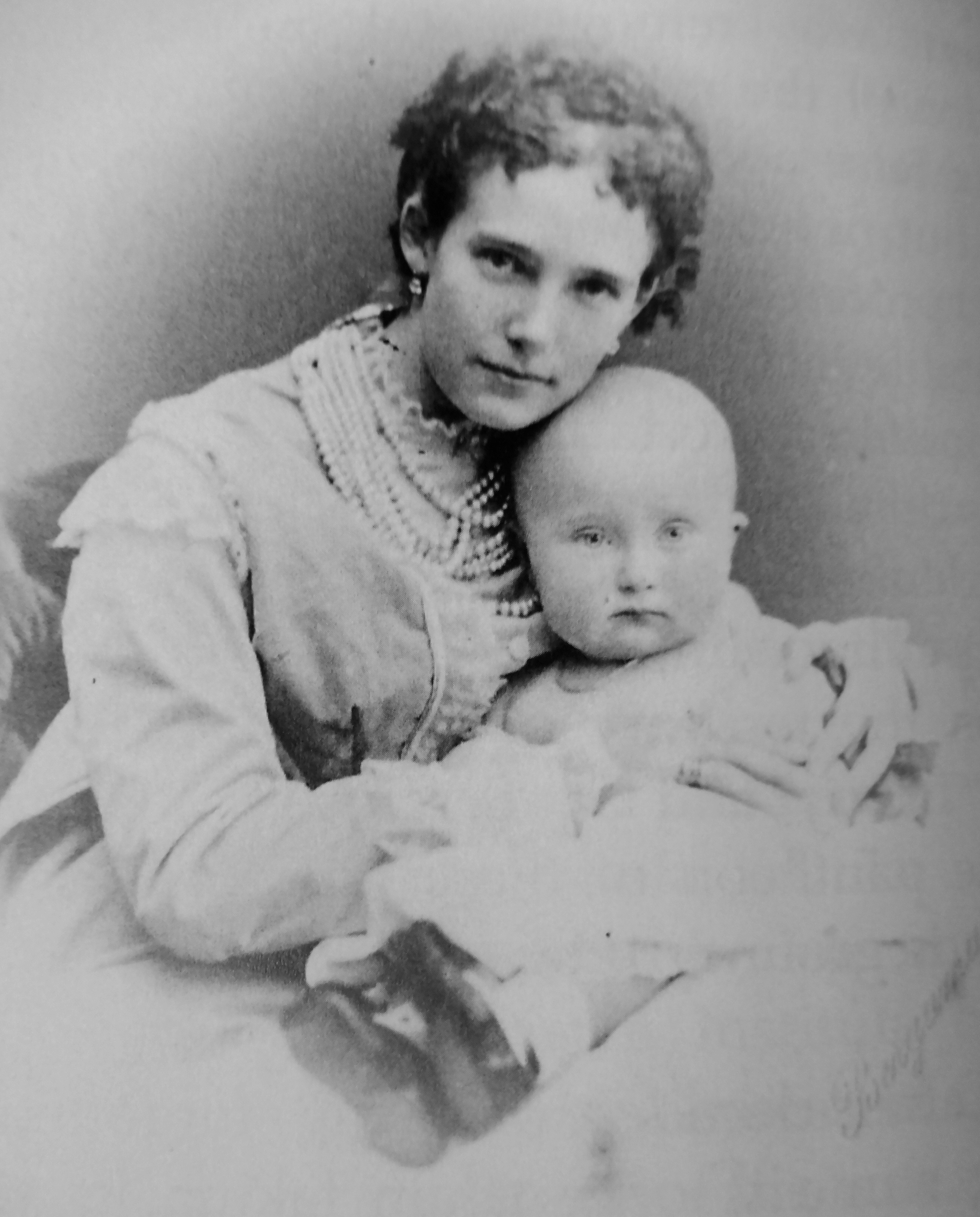
Eugenia of Leuchtenberg with her only son Peter of Oldenburg.

Eugenia was considered by contemporary sources to be the "most cultured and amiable women that could be met with", while Alexander was celebrated as a man with "much intellect and character". As a very popular and educated princess, Eugenia hosted a salon that was the center of literary, philosophical, scientific activity in Russia. By 1907, she and her husband were widely known to devote "all their life and the greater portion of their wealth to philanthropy", according to one source. Their extensive donations helped fund and found technical schools, hospitals, orphanages, as well as other philanthropic institutions all over Russia. She was also instrumental in establishing the Red Cross in Russia. The Oldenburg Institute was one such organization founded by the couple; its purpose was to teach two thousand boys and girls trade and technical education, with more than half of them being lodged at the school at the prince and princess' expense. As she suffered from delicate health, Eugenia did not often venture out, instead preferring to quietly entertain in her house.

While attending the opening of the St. Petersburg School of Experimental Medicine as its main benefactor in January 1907, a prominent government official, General von Launitz, was assassinated before Eugenia and her husband's eyes. The general was standing a few steps away from her husband, so that Eugenia, believing at first that Alexander had been the one killed, fell into a faint.

=== Last years ===
By 1914, Alexander was almost an "invalid", traveling with the help of a nurse for his care. Later that year, while driving just outside Wiesenthal in Baden with his valet and nurse, Alexander was in an auto wreck, sustaining very grave injuries. His gentleman-in-waiting and others who were traveling with the duke, either in his car or another driving behind them, were also injured in the crash, as it involved both vehicles. Alexander survived the wreck. Later in the year 1914, Alexander was chosen by Emperor Nicholas to be supreme chief of medical services to the military and naval forces of Imperial Russia. Though his selection as a royal duke was unusual to hold such a high medical-related position, there had been another precedent in another royal house, Prince Louis Ferdinand of Bavaria, who at that time was serving as surgeon general to the German army.

In exile due to the Russian Revolution, Eugenia died on 4 May 1925 at Biarritz, France. Alexander would die seven years later, on 6 September 1932. Their philanthropy had become so well known, that by 1914, newspaper sources commented that of all the royal personages at St. Petersburg, "there [were] probably not two who are so universally beloved as the Duke and Duchess of Oldenburg".

== Ancestry ==
Ancestors of Princess Eugenia Maximilianovna of Leuchtenberg

8. Alexandre, vicomte de Beauharnais
4. Eugène de Beauharnais, 1st Duke of Leuchtenberg
9. Joséphine Tascher de La Pagerie
2. Maximilian de Beauharnais, 3rd Duke of Leuchtenberg
10. Maximilian I Joseph of Bavaria
5. Princess Augusta of Bavaria
11. Princess Augusta Wilhelmine of Hesse-Darmstadt
1. Princess Eugenia Maximilianovna of Leuchtenberg
12. Paul I of Russia
6. Nicholas I of Russia
13. Duchess Sophie Dorothea of Württemberg
3. Grand Duchess Maria Nikolaevna of Russia
14. Frederick William III of Prussia
7. Princess Charlotte of Prussia
15. Duchess Louise of Mecklenburg-Strelitz
