= Duke Alexander of Oldenburg =

Russian royal duke (1844–1932)

Duke Alexander
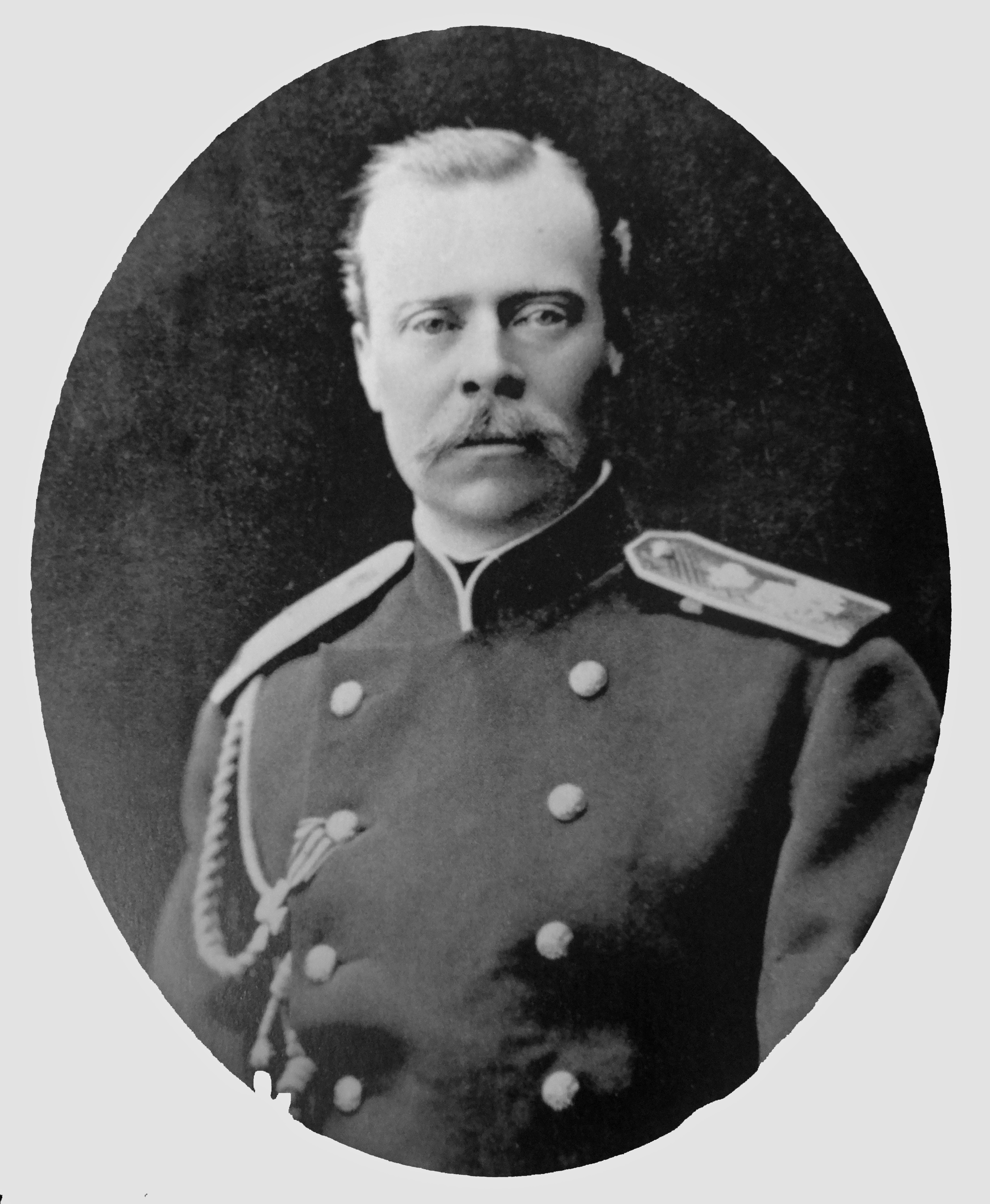
- Born: 2 June [O.S. 21 May] 1844; St. Petersburg, Russian Empire
- Died: 6 September 1932 (aged 88); Biarritz, France
- Burial: Cimetière du Sabaou, Biarritz, France
- Spouse: Princess Eugenia Maximilianovna of Leuchtenberg (m. 1868; died 1925)
- Issue: Duke Peter
Names
- Alexander Frederick Constantine; German: Alexander Friedrich Konstantin
- House: House of Holstein-Gottorp
- Father: Duke Peter of Oldenburg
- Mother: Princess Therese of Nassau-Weilburg

Duke Alexander Frederick Constantin of Oldenburg (German: Herzog Alexander Friedrich Konstantin von Oldenburg; Russian: Алекса́ндр Петро́вич Ольденбу́ргский, Alexander Petrovich Oldenburgsky; 2 June [O.S. 21 May] 1844 – 6 September 1932) was the second son of Duke Peter of Oldenburg and Princess Therese of Nassau-Weilburg. Though he had a German title and ancestry, Alexander and his siblings were born and raised in St. Petersburg as the grandchildren of Grand Duchess Catherine Pavlovna of Russia.

Alexander served as Adjutant general to Alexander III of Russia, and also as commanding general of the Imperial Guard. Alexander was the Russian candidate submitted to succeed Alexander, Prince of Bulgaria, though this nomination failed to gain the support of the other great European powers. At the outbreak of World War I, Nicholas II appointed Alexander, a medical doctor, as supreme chief of the medical service of the military and naval forces.

Alexander and his wife Princess Eugenia Maximilianovna of Leuchtenberg were noted for their philanthropy, establishing schools, hospitals, orphanages, and other charitable organizations in Russia. During World War I, the duke famously invited wounded British and French soldiers to stay for free in a sanatorium he founded in the Crimea. When the Russian revolution broke out, Alexander was reported to have been one of the Imperial family killed by the newly emerged Bolshevik government, though this turned out to be only a rumor as the duke was able to escape and hide away in Finland and eventually to France, where he died at Biarritz on 6 September 1932.

== Family and early life ==
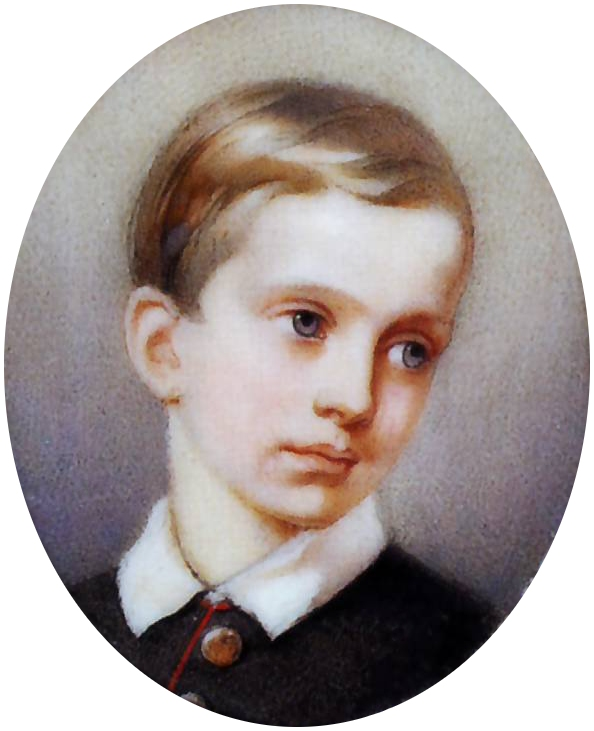
Alexander of Oldenburg by Hau, 1853.

Alexander's grandfather had married Grand Duchess Catherine Pavlovna, daughter of Paul I of Russia, and their descendants had been raised in Russia ever since and become completely "Russianized". Thus despite his German title, Duke Alexander, like his father before him, had grown up entirely in Russia, serving his military service for the czars. He was always considered a part of the Russian imperial family.

== Marriage ==
On 19 January 1868 at the Winter Palace, Alexander married Princess Eugenia Maximilianovna of Leuchtenberg, a daughter of Maximilian de Beauharnais, 3rd Duke of Leuchtenberg. Like his own family, Eugenia was also an offshoot of the Imperial family, as her mother was Grand Duchess Maria Nikolaevna, eldest daughter of Nicholas I of Russia. She was entitled to the rank Imperial Highness, and was born and raised in St. Petersburg.

The couple had one son, Peter. Eugenia had a long-standing friendship with Empress Maria Feodorovna, and the two helped arrange the marriage of Eugenia's son to Maria's daughter Grand Duchess Olga Alexandrovna.

== Military and professional career ==
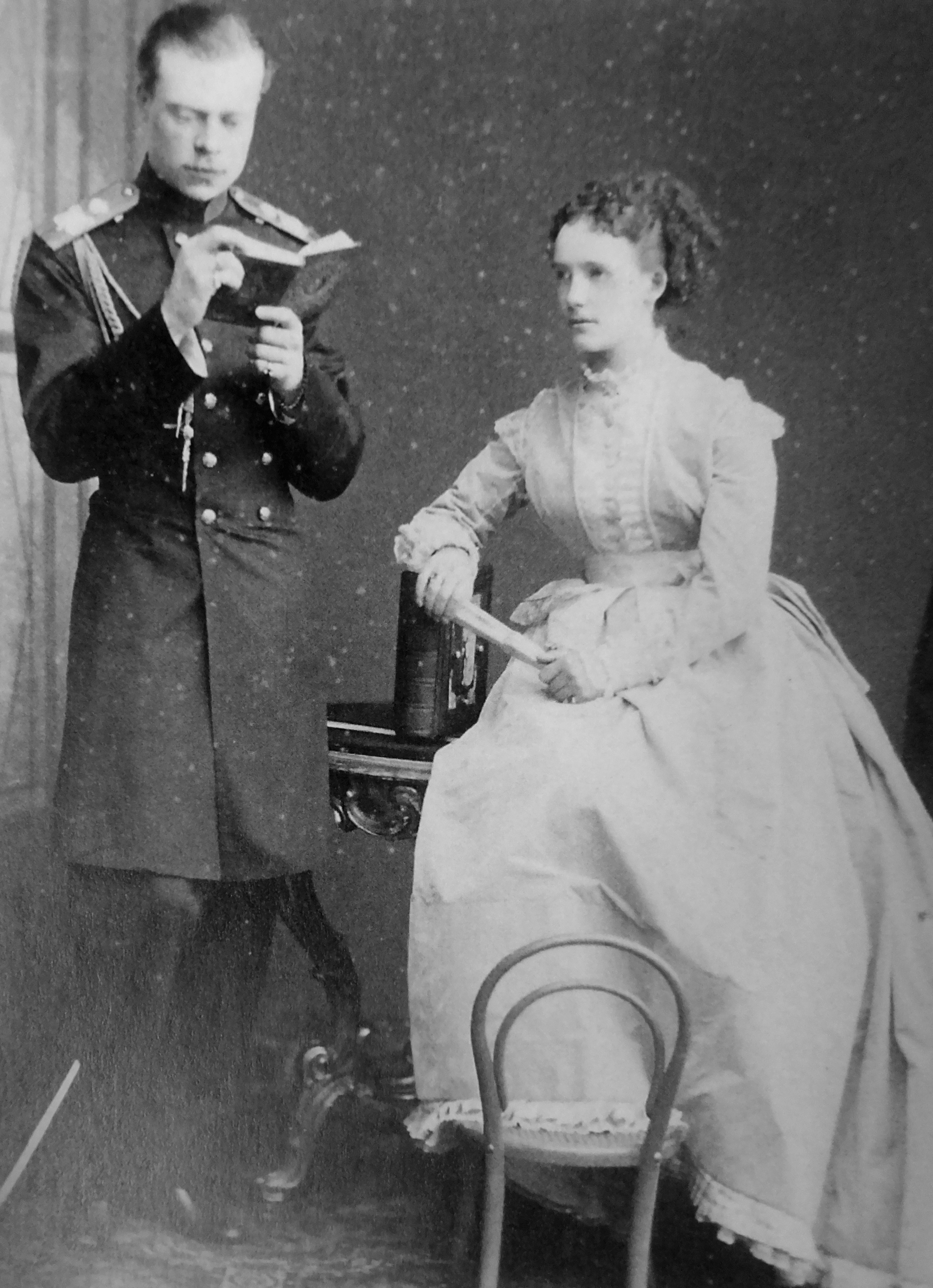
Alexander Petrovich of Oldenburg and his wife Princess Eugenia Maximilianovna of Leuchtenberg.

Like his two brothers, Alexander served in the Russian army. He held the position of Adjutant-General to Emperor Alexander III. He was also the commanding general of the Imperial Guard. Alexander served on the State Council

In 1889, Alexander resigned the office of commanding general of the Imperial Guard, because of the increasingly anti-German tone pervading into Russian politics, and also because he wanted to remove barriers that would bar his succession to the Grand Duchy of Oldenburg. Emperor Alexander refused his resignation, but gave the duke an eleven-month leave of absence.

Alexander was one of the richest princes in Russia in both landed and funded property; this was also partly due to the wealth of his wife, whose inherited wealth, as the granddaughter of Nicholas I of Russia, was said to be enormous. Alexander was also second-in-line to the throne of Oldenburg, as Frederick Augustus II, Grand Duke of Oldenburg had only one young son, Hereditary Grand Duke Nikolaus; were he to die before his father, Alexander would have become heir presumptive. Because of this wealth, it was expected that Alexander and his family would remain in Russia and give up their claim to the Grand Duchy of Oldenburg, were they to succeed to that particular territory.

Alexander was a doctor of medicine and undertook active management of the hospitals he helped in founding. At the outbreak of World War I in 1914, Emperor Nicholas II appointed Alexander to the post of supreme chief of the medical service of the military and naval forces. Though his selection as a royal duke was unusual to hold such a high medical-related position, there had been another precedent in another royal house, Prince Louis Ferdinand of Bavaria, who at that time was serving as surgeon general to the German army.

== Candidate for Bulgarian throne ==
After Alexander, Prince of Bulgaria abdicated on 7 September 1886, various replacement candidates were proposed by the great European powers, particularly by the governments of Russia and Germany. Because of his Russian background, Alexander was recommended at his government's suggestion for the Bulgarian crown. Not only was he married to a Russian princess, and was himself the grandson of a Russian grand duchess, but he also held the positions of Adjutant-General to Emperor Alexander, and was the Commanding General of the Imperial Guard. It was also assumed that although he would lose much of his property if he succeeded to Oldenburg, he would be able to keep his wealth if he became the sovereign of Bulgaria because of Emperor Alexander's support.

In several desperate attempts to prevent Russia from gaining control of Bulgaria however, the throne was offered to candidates who lacked Russian ties, such as a prince of Denmark or even the king of Romania. In the end, Prince Ferdinand of Saxe-Coburg-Gotha was chosen, becoming Ferdinand I of Bulgaria.

== Philanthropy ==
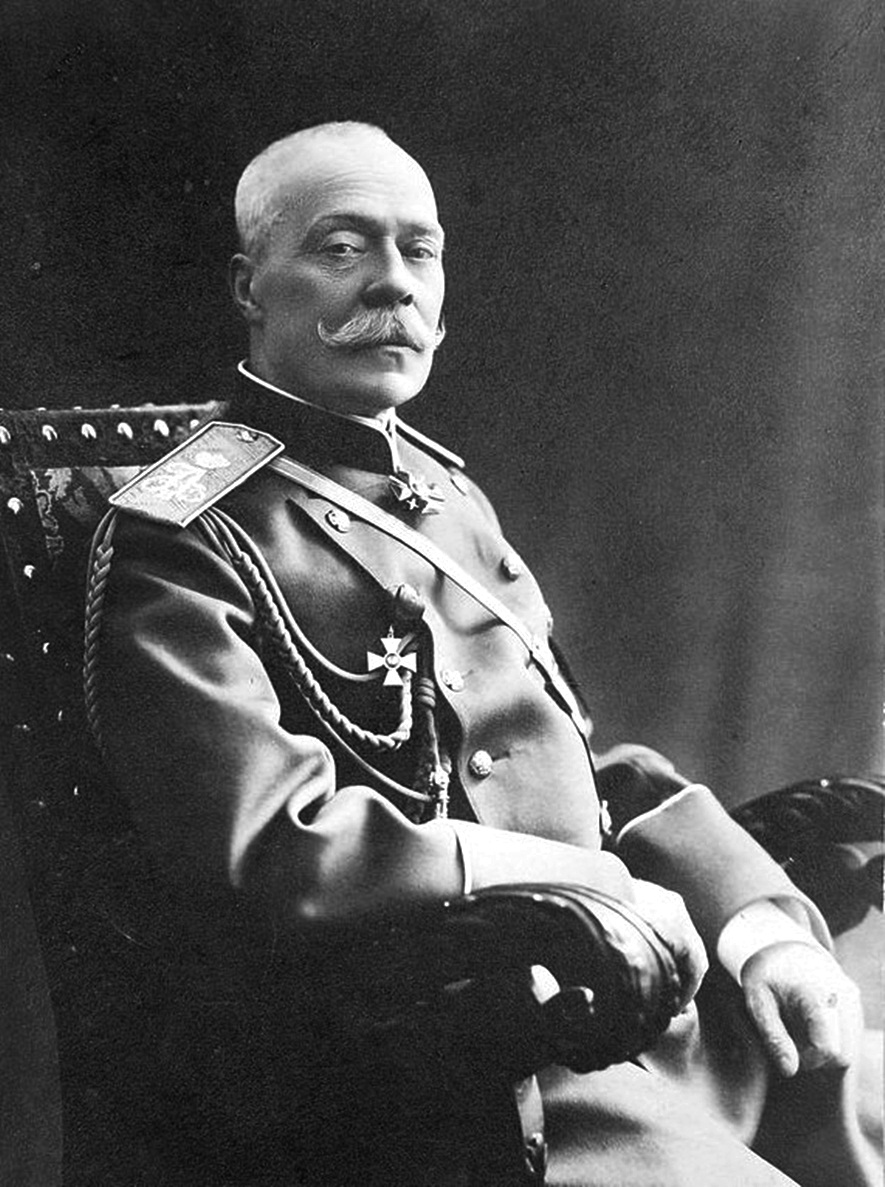
Alexander Petrovich of Oldenburg

Like his father before him, Alexander was well-educated and clever, and concentrated much of his time and energy to philanthropic works throughout Russia. He was president of several schools as well as the St. Petersburg-based Institute of Experimental Medicine. Alexander and Eugenia founded the Oldenburg Institute at Petrograd, where more than two thousands girls and boys received technical educations while being taught trades and given free lodging and food, all at the expense of the duke and duchess. Their extensive donations helped fund and found technical schools, hospitals, orphanages, as well as other philanthropic institutions all over Russia. As Alexander was a doctor, he was deeply involved in the management of these hospitals, taking charge of the sick and wounded on their departure from the field hospitals. In his position as chief of head of medical services for the Russian army and navy, Alexander invited hundreds of wounded French and British officers to stay free-of-charge in a sanatorium he founded in the Gagra. He also greatly improved the organization of wounded soldiers at the front.

While attending the opening of the Institute of Experimental Medicine as its main benefactor in January 1907, a prominent government official, General von Launitz, was assassinated before Alexander and Eugenia's eyes. The general was standing a few steps away from her husband, so that Eugenia, believing at first that Alexander had been the one killed, fell into a faint.

He and his wife's charitable exploits became so well known that a newspaper declared in 1914 that because they devoted their lives and the greater portion of their wealth to philanthropy, "there are probably no two who are so universally beloved as the Duke and Duchess Alexander of Oldenburg".

== Later years ==
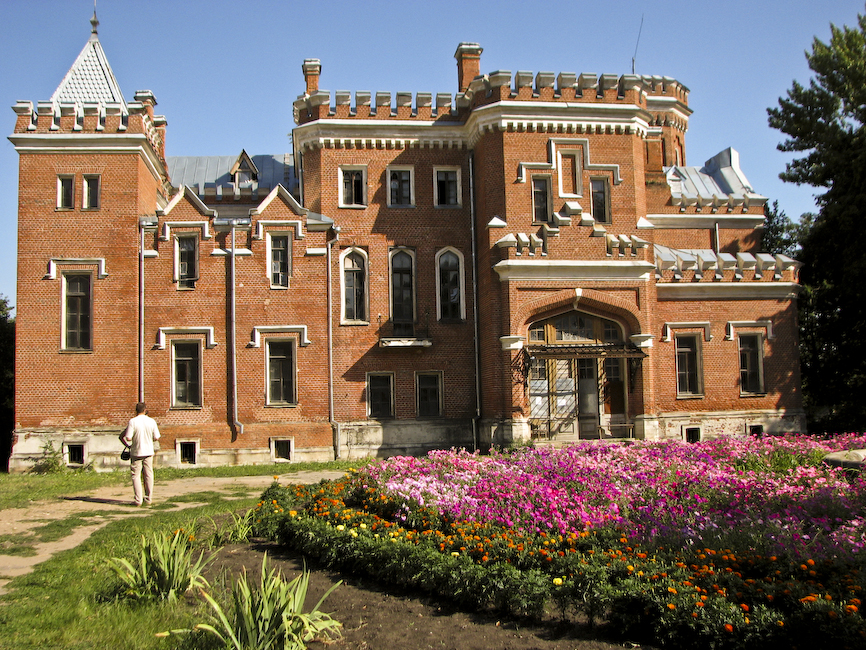
Ramon Palace, which was almost burned down in 1902 by a mob of peasants.

From 1901 Duke Alexander began building a luxury health resort at Gagra, Abkhazia. It is thought that a boundary change in 1904 which moved Gagra into Russia was due to the resort. The border was switched back in 1917.

In 1902, a mob of peasants burned Alexander's southern Russian estate of Ramon Palace, which had been a gift from Eugenia's uncle Emperor Alexander II upon the couple's marriage. Acting out of labor unrest and what was incorrectly perceived as a fake pronouncement that the Emperor would take back land given to peasants, a mob of angry people traveled throughout southern Russia and caused extensive damage. The estate survived, but fifteen years later, it would be confiscated by the new Bolshevik regime, and turned into a barracks, school, hospital, and housing for a nearby factory.

By 1914, Alexander was almost an "invalid", traveling with the help of a nurse for his care. Later that year, while driving just outside Wiesenthal in Baden with his valet and nurse, Alexander was in an auto wreck, sustaining very grave injuries. His gentleman-in-waiting and others who were traveling with the duke, either in his car or another driving behind them, were also injured in the crash, as it involved both vehicles. Alexander survived the wreck.

=== Russian revolution ===
Despite his well-known charitable activities, a price was put on his head by the newly emerged Bolshevik regime, who also destroyed the institutions he founded. During the Russian revolution, Alexander was reported to have been one of the members of the Imperial family killed by the government. Further reports revealed however that Alexander had been in hiding in Finland ever since the revolution broke out, eventually turning up in Paris. As he left his property (and thus the main source of his wealth) in Russia, Alexander found himself relatively penniless in France. He died in exile at Biarritz on 6 September 1932. He was buried at Cimetière du Sabaou in Biarritz.

== Honours ==
Russian honours

- Knight of the Imperial Order of Saint Anna, 3rd Class, 30 August 1866, 1st Class, 1 July 1868
- Knight of the Imperial Order of Saint Andrew the Apostle the First-called, 1 July 1868
- Knight of the Order of Saint Alexander Nevsky, 1 July 1868
- Knight of the Imperial Order of the White Eagle, 1 July 1868
- Knight of the Imperial Knight of Saint Stanislaus, 1st Class, 1 July 1868
- Knight of the Imperial Order of Saint Vladimir, 3rd Class, 30 August 1870, 2nd Class with Swords, 1878; 1st Class, 1900
- Knight of the Order of Saint George, 4th Class ("For courage and bravery, rendered in multi-temporal affairs of the Turks in 1877"), 1 January 1878
- Gold Sword for Bravery, for the transition through the Balkans, 24 June 1878

Foreign honours

- Grand Cross of the House and Merit Order of Duke Peter Friedrich Ludwig, with Golden Crown, 2 June 1844; with Swords, 26 March 1878 (Grand Duchy of Oldenburg)
- Grand Cross of the Order of the Württemberg Crown, 1863 (Kingdom of Württemberg)
- Grand Commander's Cross of the Royal House Order of Hohenzollern, 7 May 1873 (Kingdom of Prussia)
- Grand Cross of the Royal Hungarian Order of Saint Stephen, 1874 (Austria-Hungary)
- Grand Cross of the Order of Prince Danilo I, 1881 (Principality of Montenegro)
- Grand Cross of the Order of Saint Alexander, 1883 (Principality of Bulgaria)
- Grand Cross of the Grand Ducal Hessian Order of Ludwig, 24 February 1889 (Grand Duchy of Hesse and by Rhine)

== Ancestry ==
Ancestors of Duke Alexander of Oldenburg

8. Peter I, Grand Duke of Oldenburg
4. Duke George of Oldenburg
9. Duchess Frederica of Württemberg
2. Duke Peter Georgievich of Oldenburg
10. Paul I of Russia
5. Grand Duchess Catherine Pavlovna of Russia
11. Duchess Sophie Dorothea of Württemberg
1. Duke Alexander Petrovich of Oldenburg
12. Frederick William, Prince of Nassau-Weilburg
6. William, Duke of Nassau
13. Burgravine Louise Isabelle of Kirchberg
3. Princess Therese of Nassau-Weilburg
14. Frederick, Duke of Saxe-Altenburg
7. Princess Louise of Saxe-Hildburghausen
15. Duchess Charlotte Georgine of Mecklenburg-Strelitz
