= Kalinowski =

Coat of arms of Kalinowski noble family

Kalinowski (other spellings listed below) is a surname which is most frequent in north-eastern Poland. It comes from place names such as Kalinowa, Kalinowo, and Kalinów, which are derived from the word kalina ("Viburnum"). It is related to the following surnames in other languages:

Language	Masculine	Feminine	Plural
Polish	Kalinowski ([kaliˈnɔfski])	Kalinowska ([kaliˈnɔfska])	Kalinowscy ([kaliˈnɔfst͡sɨ])
Belarusian (Romanization)	Каліноўскі (Kalinoŭski)	Каліноўская (Kalinoŭskaja, Kalinouskaya, Kalinouskaia)	
Lithuanian	Kalinauskas	Kalinauskienė (married); Kalinauskaitė (unmarried)	
Russian (Romanization)	Калиновский (Kalinovsky, Kalinovskiy, Kalinovskij)	Калиновская (Kalinovskaya, Kalinovskaia, Kalinovskaja)	
Ukrainian (Romanization)	Калиновський (Kalynovskyi, Kalynovskyy, Kalynovskyj)	Калиновська (Kalynovska)	

== People ==
- Kalinowski family
- Andrzej Kalinowski (died 1531), Polish nobleman
- Jan Kalinowski (1857–1941), Polish naturalist who settled in Peru
- Efim Kalinovsky (1892–?), Russian nobleman and military leader, participant in the First World War and the Civil War. He was Cavalier of St. George and Major General of the White Army, head of the Kolchakov division.
- Jarosław Kalinowski (born 1962), Polish politician
- John Kalinowski (1946–2013), British music manage
- Konstanty Kalinowski (1838–1864), Polish-Belarusian writer, journalist, lawyer and revolutionary
- Lothar Kalinowsky (1899–1992), American psychiatrist
- Małgorzata Kalinowska-Iszkowska, Polish computer scientist
- Marcin Kalinowski (c. 1605 – 1652), Polish nobleman
- Raphael Kalinowski (1835–1907), Saint
- Zygmunt Kalinowski (born 1949), Polish footballer

== Characters ==
- Jimmy Kalinowski, a recurring character on the American TV series The Bear

== See also ==
- Kalinowski agouti (Dasyprocta kalinowskii), a rodent of Peru
- Kalinowski's mastiff bat (Mormopterus kalinowskii), of Peru and Chile
- Kalinowski's mouse opossum (Hyladelphys kalinowskii), of South America
- Kalinowski's Oldfield mouse (Thomasomys kalinowskii), of Peru
