= Kalinauskas =

- Lithuanian surname
- m.: Kalinauskas
- f.: (unmarried): Kalinauskaitė
- f.: (married): Kalinauskienė
- Related names: Polish: Kalinowski

Kalinauskas is a common Lithuanian surname, equivalent to Polish Kalinowski. Its feminine forms are: Kalinauskienė (married woman or widow) and Kalinauskaitė (unmarried woman).

It may refer to:

- Juozas Kalinauskas (b. 1935), Lithuanian sculptor and medalist
- Kostas Kalinauskas (1838–1864), writer, journalist, lawyer and revolutionary
- Rapolas Kalinauskas (1835–1907), Polish Discalced Carmelite friar inside the Russian partition of Polish-Lithuanian Commonwealth, in the city of Vilnius.
- Vytautas Kalinauskas (1929–2001), Lithuanian graphic artist, painter and stage designer
- Rolandas Kalinauskas, Lithuanian pilot and ultralight aircraft designer (Rolandas Kalinauskas RK-5 Ruth, RK-6 Magic, RK-7 Orange)
- Igor Kalinauskas (b. 1945), Russian artist, theater director, musician, member of the vocal duo Duo Zikr
- Virginija Kalinauskaitė (b. 1957), Lithuanian graphic artist
- Tomas Kalinauskas (b. 2000), Lithuanian footballer
