= Branica =

Branica may refer to the following places:

- Branica, Kuyavian-Pomeranian Voivodeship (north-central Poland)
- Branica, Łódź Voivodeship (central Poland)
- Branica, Masovian Voivodeship (east-central Poland)
- Branica (river), a river in southwestern Slovenia
- Branica - a part of Suszec, Silesian Voivodeship (south Poland)
