= Second Battle of Nagyszeben =

1849 event of the Hungarian Revolution

Coordinates: 45°47′42.8″N 24°08′56.4″E

- Part of the Hungarian Revolution of 1848
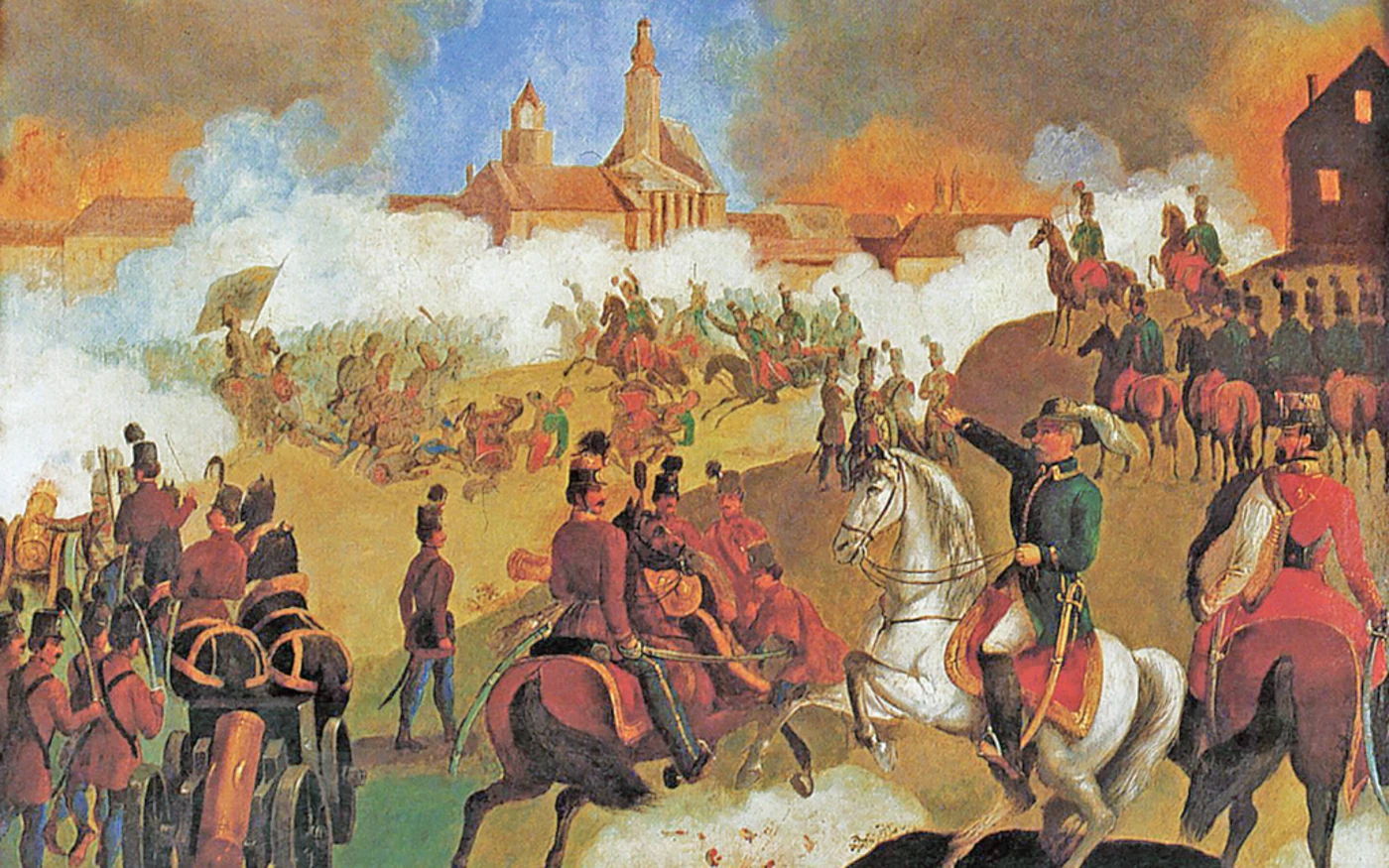
- General Bem at the capture of Nagyszeben - unknown author 1849
Date	11 March 1849
Location	Nagyszeben, Szeben County, Transylvania Kingdom of Hungary (now Sibiu, Romania)
Result	Hungarian victory the Hungarians chase the Austrian and Russian troops out of Transylvania

Belligerents
Hungarian Revolutionary Army	Russian Empire; Austrian Empire * Transylvanian Saxons

Commanders and leaders
Józef Bem	Grigory Skariatin; Anton Puchner

Strength
Total: 4,674 + ? men 30–36 cannons	6,000 + ? men 29 cannons (8 field cannons 21 castle cannons); Did not participate: 8,676 men 36 cannons

Casualties and losses
Total: 40–138 men 5–40 dead 35–98 wounded	Total: 239–401 men 99–97 dead 105–150 wounded 35–154 missing and captive 17–24 cannons

The Second Battle of Nagyszeben (or Sibiu, or Hermannstadt) was a battle in the Hungarian war of Independence of 1848-1849 fought on 11 March 1849 between the Hungarian army led by the Polish General Józef Bem and the garrison of Nagyszeben, the Habsburg headquarters of Transylvania, composed by the Russian detachment led by Colonel Grigory Skariatin Austrian troops led by Lieutenant General Alois Pfersmann, and Transylvanian Saxon national guards. Before the battle, Bem managed to make the commander of the Austrian main Commander-in-Chief of Transylvania, Lieutenant General Anton Puchner think that he barricaded himself at Segesvár, while he escaped, heading to Nagyszeben. While Puchner was trying to encircle Segesvár where he thought that Bem was hiding, the latter headed through a quick march to Nagyszeben, where he defeated the Ruso-Austro-Saxon garrison led by General Skariatin, and captured the city. Hearing about this, Puchner suffered a mental collapse, as a result of which, the still much superior Austrian and Russian troops retreated from Transylvania. Thanks to this victory Bem reinstalled the Hungarian rule over the province. This victory was the overture of the victorious Hungarian Spring Campaign which leberated almost all the territories of Hungary from the imperial rule.

== Background ==
After the Battle of Piski on 9 February, Major General Józef Bem was informed that the Austrian imperial troops had again invaded Northern Transylvania, threatening the Hungarian possession of this part of the province. Bem responded to this threat quickly, by bypassing Puchner, who prepared him a trap at Szászsebes, and then he quickly reached North Transylvania and drove out the imperial troops led by Lieutenant General Ignaz von Malkowski.

Meanwhile, the main commander of the imperial armies of Transylvania, Lieutenant General Anton Puchner was in a state of near lethargy after the defeats of Piski and Alvinc, suffered against Bem. He had waited nearly a week to write his official report on the events of the week which passed between the battles of Vízakna and Alvinc, and he had no mindset to dictate it all at once: on 15 February he wrote a chronicle of the successes between 4 and 8 February, and only the next day pulled himself together to report to the main commander of the imperial forces from Hungary, Field Marshal Alfred I, Prince of Windisch-Grätz about the battles of Piski and Alvinc; although from these reports it was hard to understand if they were victories or defeats. He felt that fate had once again done him an injustice. His losses so far had been 1,600 soldiers, 1,000 of whom were recovering their injuries in hospitals, writing to Windisch-Grätz, that he had captured 21 guns with the heroism and blood loss of his soldiers. Bem had remained - as Puchner claimed - with 3,000 men and 2 cannons after Vízakna, and at the moment when he thought he had been annihilated, a single Hungarian relief force reinforced him, not only replacing his losses, but increasing them two or three times as they were before, while his forces were diminishing day by day, and under such circumstances the most brilliant victory won - I mean in its immediate consequences - will be a real defeat. He believed that Bem now had 6–8,000 men and 25-30 guns, so he did not want to attack until he had received reinforcements. He asked for help from both Windisch-Grätz and from the Austrian garrison of Temesvár. His officers had previously tried in vain to persuade him to attack immediately, but only on 28 February - having been informed of Malkowski's attack in northern Transylvania - he finally moved out of his headquarters from Nagyszeben, marching northwards. His intention was to clear the valley of the Küküllő, beat Bem at Medgyes and then take Marosvásárhely. He asked Malkowski to advance from Beszterce to Marosvásárhely.

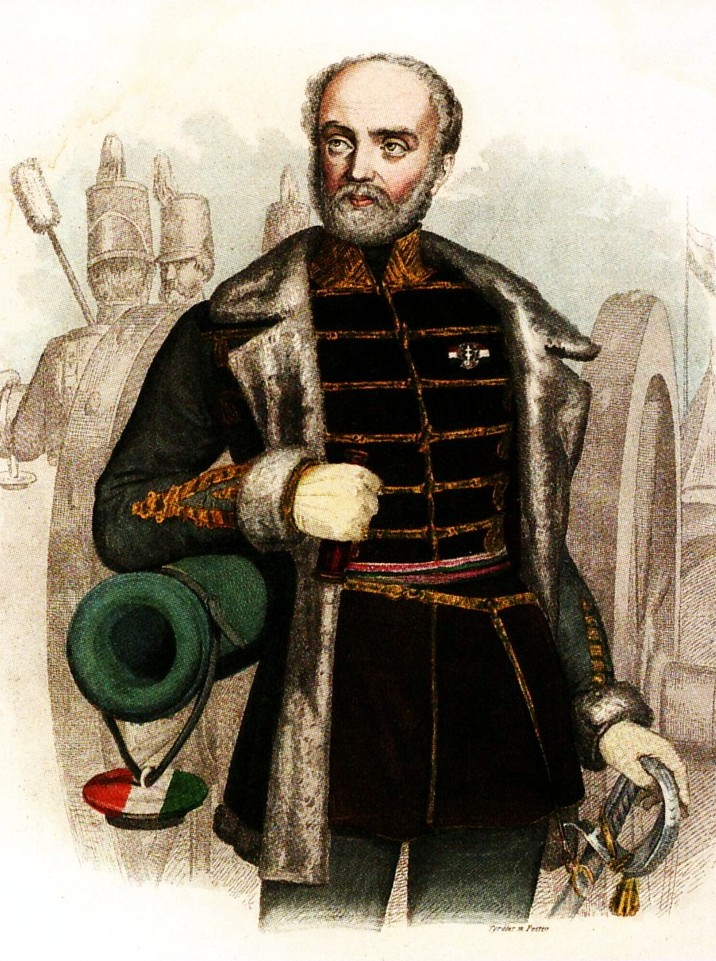
Józef Bem

On 1 March Bem arrived in Medgyes. The next day, on 2 March, the imperial attack began at Kiskapus, which was initially successful, but then the Hungarian troops retook their previous positions. We ran out of ammunition, so we were forced to retreat until we were resupplied, finally they [those whose job was to supply the soldiers] stopped us, but they did not supply us with ammunition, because there was none in the whole camp, but [they told us that] we had to attack [only] with bayonets and drive the enemy away, which we finally did, in the evening with a great noise, because we could make a noise better [scream louder] than they could, and we chased them all the way to Asszonyfalva, [but] we did not chase them any further - wrote a participating soldier. Both sides suffered heavy losses in the fierce fighting, and the Hungarian artillery fired almost all its ammunition.

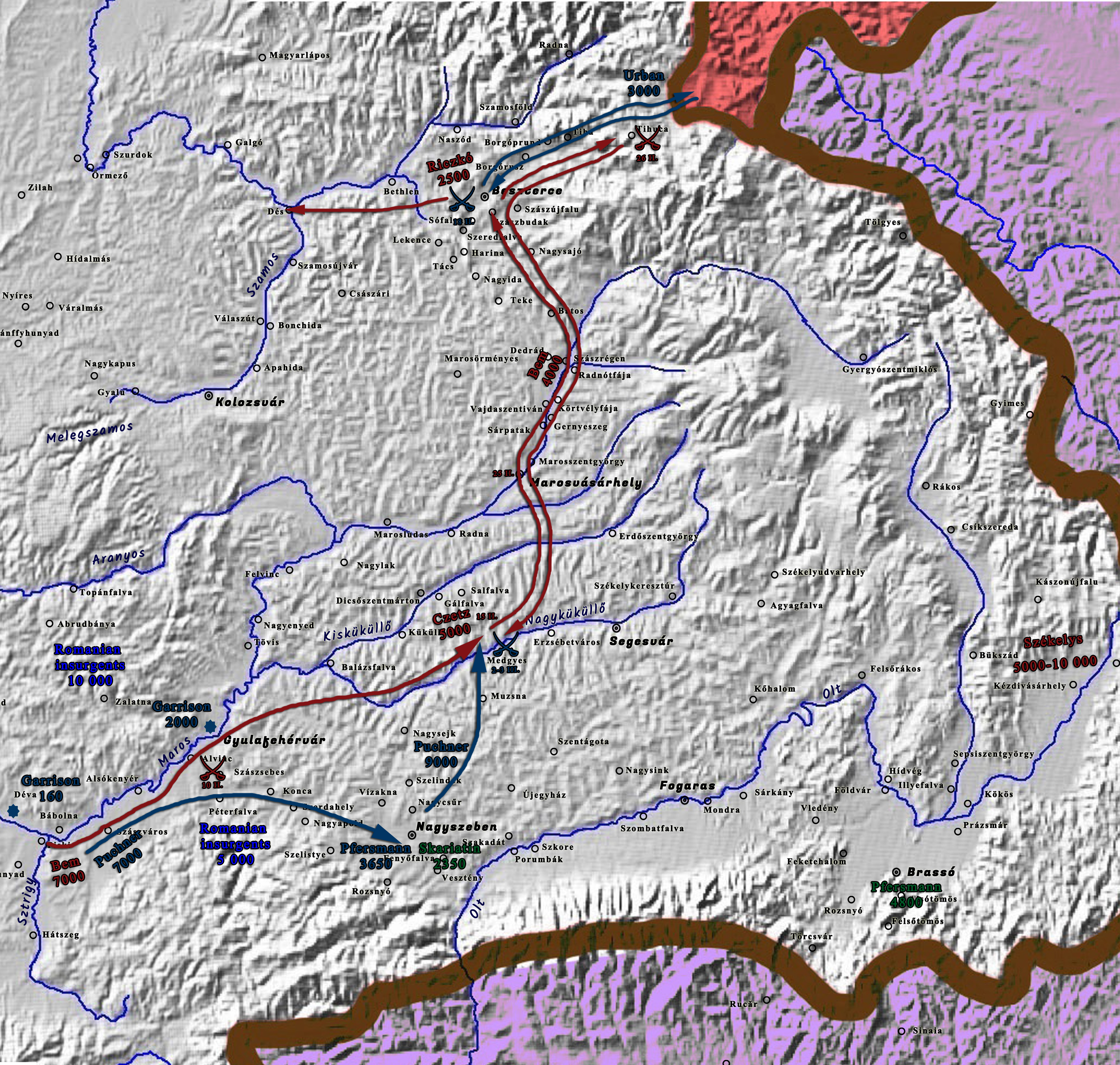
The Campaign of the Hungarian army of Transylvania under General Józef Bem after the Battle of Piski (9 February 1849) and the Battle of Medgyes (2-3 March 1849)

On 3 March, all of Puchner's troops arrived on the battlefield and attacked with a considerable advantage. At first the Hungarian troops held against their fire well, but the artillery of the imperial army inflicted increasingly heavy losses on the Hungarian artillery. Puchner's left wing pushed back the Hungarian right wing, forcing the artillery to retreat. Bem attempted to regroup his troops, but Puchner's infantry soon broke through the weakened Hungarian army center, and Bem ordered a retreat. Towards evening Bem received reinforcements, which stopped the advance of the imperials. Bem ordered an attack, but the enemy infantry repulsed it and forced the Hungarian infantry to flee. Bem was then forced to retreat towards Segesvár. The Hungarian losses were at least as high as at Piski - i.e. about 700.

After the battle, in order to successfully resist an attack from Medgyes, Bem took position in the defensive earth works he had already built between Segesvár and Dános. Bem now had some time to reorganize his troops, and also received new reinforcements in Segesvár, which made him to plan again to attack Nagyszeben, this time hoping to finally occupy the Austrian headquarters from Transylvania, after his insuccess from 21 January.

Puchner did not pursue the retreating Hungarian army. The Austrian corps was very exhausted from the two days of fighting, which is why Puchner wanted to rest his troops on 4 and 5 March before moving on to strike a decisive blow at Bem.

Puchner, as he had received no reinforcements from anywhere, now had only the troops he had fought with in the Battle of Medgyes, whose order of battle, according to Philipp August Joachim Freiherr von der Heydte - was this. The corps was divided into three brigades. The division commander was József Kalliány, the only general in the mobile corps other than Puchner.

1st Brigade
Commander: Colonel Van der Nüll:

- 3d Battalion of the 31st ("Leiningen") Infantry Regiment,
- 1st and 3d Battalions, 41th ("Sivkovich") Infantry Regiment,
- one battalion of the 16th (1st Romanian) Border Guard Infantry Regiment,
- 2 companies of the 5th ("Prinz von Savoyen") Dragoon Regiment,
- one three-pounder infantry battery of the 5th ("Bervaldo") Artillery Regiment,
- one six-pounder infantry battery of the 5th ("Bervaldo") Artillery Regiment.

Total: 4 battalions. 2 cavalry regiments, 2 batteries. (2480 infantry, 180 cavalry, 12 guns).

2nd Brigade
Commander: Baron Colonel Stutterheim:

- 3d Battalion of the 51st ("Karl Ferdinand") Infantry Regiment,
- 1st and 2nd Battalions of the 63rd ("Bianchi") Infantry Regiment,
- 3d battalion of the 16th (1st Romanian) Border Guard Infantry Regiment,
- two companies of the 11th (Székely) Border Guard Hussars Regiment,
- one six-pounder infantry battery of the 5th ("Bervaldo") Artillery Regiment,
- one three-pounder infantry battery of the 5th ("Bervaldo") Artillery Regiment.

Total: 4 battalions, 2 cavalry regiments, 2 batteries (2530 infantry, 166 cavalry, 12 guns).

Reserve Brigade
Commander: Baron Lieutenant Colonel Uracca:

- 3rd Battalion of the 24th ("Parma") Infantry Regiment,
- 3rd and Reserve Battalion of the 62nd ("Tursky") Infantry Regiment,
- one "Uracca” Grenadier Battalion.
- 1/3 Battalion of the Bukovina Border Guards,
- 2/3 battalion of Saxon Kaiserjägers,
- eight companies of the 3rd ("E. H. Max") Chevau-léger Cavalry Regiment,
- one six-pounder infantry battery of the 5th ("Bervaldo") Artillery Regiment.

Total: 5 battalions, 8 cavalry companies, 2 batteries. (2,740 infantry, 580 cavalry, 12 guns).

So the whole corps consisted of 13 battalions, 12 cavalry companies, and 6 batteries (36 guns). The total number of its personnel (without the artillerymen and carters) was 8676 soldiers. (Note: Puchner's report to Field Marshal Alfred I, Prince of Windisch-Grätz, mentions only 7452 soldiers, but Heydte's figures seem more likely, because Puchner, by talking about fewer soldiers, may have been trying to convince the main commander to send him more reinforcements.) From this figure, however, must be deducted the losses caused by the battle of Medgyes, which were 322 men. Thus, the Austrian troops under Puchner, without the artillerymen and charioteers, numbered 8354, but with them, they could have reached 9,000.

His victory at Medgyes made Puchner to make a bold to surround and destroy Bem's troops with attacks from several directions. The military operation plan of Puchner's army was prepared by the chief of staff of the Corps - Major Maroičić. Its basic idea was that a stronger detachment under the leadership of Major August von Heydte would feign an attack in the direction of the Medgyes-Segesvár road through Berethalom-Váldhíd-Erzsébetváros-Holdvilág-Dános, make Bem to think that the main imperial troops are coming from there, thus luring him into the aforementioned defensive position. Meanwhile, the rest of the corps would start its march on 6 March, bypassing Segesvár from the south, via Riomfalva (today a village of the municipality of Berethalom)-Bürkös-Szentágota-Hégen-Apold-Segesd (today a village of the municipality of Apold), cutting off the Hungarian army from the main source of its strength, Székely Land. At that time, Maroičić was still counting on the support of Lieutenant-General Malkowski's troops from Bukovina, which, he thought, by the time Puchner reached Segesvár, should have reached Marosvásárhely (he did not know that Bem already had driven Malkowski out of Transylvania), thus tying up part of the Hungarian forces in Székely Land, from where Bem expected his reinforcements. Captain Count Alberti, with 1 1/2 companies of the 3rd Chevau-léger Regiment, starting from Medgyes, will reconnoitre the right bank of the Nagyküküllő and seek a connection to Marosvásárhely with the division of Lieutenant General Malkowski. The plan had one, but very serious flaw: it had too many uncertainties. If Malkowski didn't attack, if any of the encircling columns were late, if Bem detected the encirclement attempt, the whole plan could fall apart.

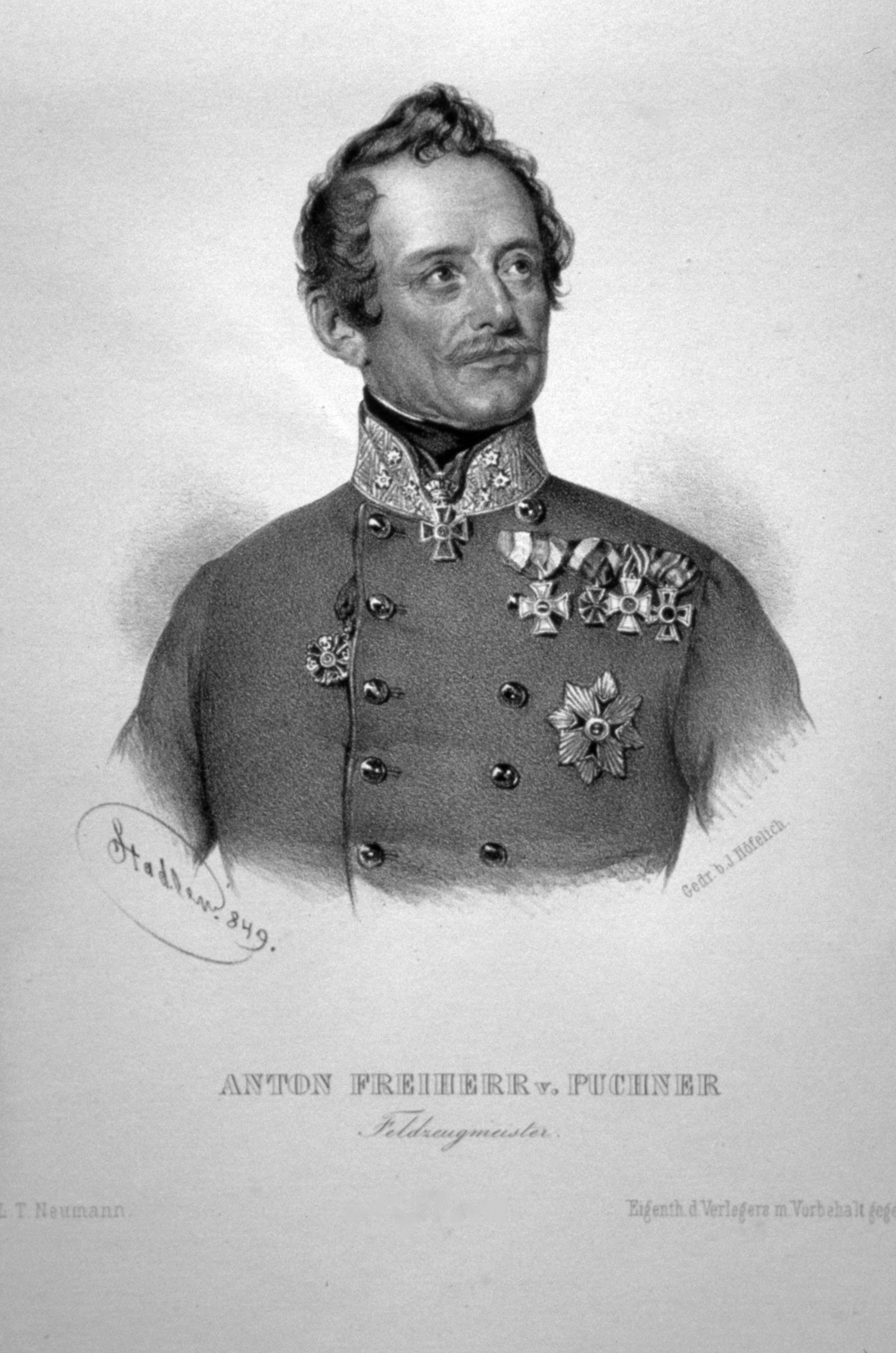
Anton Freiherr von Puchner Litho

The quicker Puchner made his encircling movement, the less the Hungarian army could reorganize itself from the damages suffered at Medgyes, and the less he could strengthen itself by picking up reinforcements. But it was also certain that, it would have been inadvisable to attack Bem with a worn-out, exhausted Austrian army, after they covered the distance of 92 kilometers over hills and valleys on unmaintained bad roads, as it was planned. But, as we have seen above, this - and the waiting for Malkowski - was the main reason that caused Puchner to lose two days, and thus to lose the advantage won at Medgyes.

The weather was also the worst possible: rain and melting snow, blizzard and frost alternated constantly. The road, which had been passable enough a day before, had now become a thick mortar, in which man, horse, cannon, and cart alike could only move forward with bitter agony. The retreating Hungarians' guns were also stuck in the mud on the Medgyes-Segesvár road, and it was only due to the sluggishness of the pursuers that they did not fall into the hands of the Austrians. Thus it was easily conceivable, therefore, that on the side roads, which were isolated from the heavier traffic and not sufficiently prepared, even greater obstacles were placed in the way of the Austrian corps. The malnourished and exhausted traction horses were soon exhausted, so that 6 pairs of oxen had to pull each cannon out of the mud.

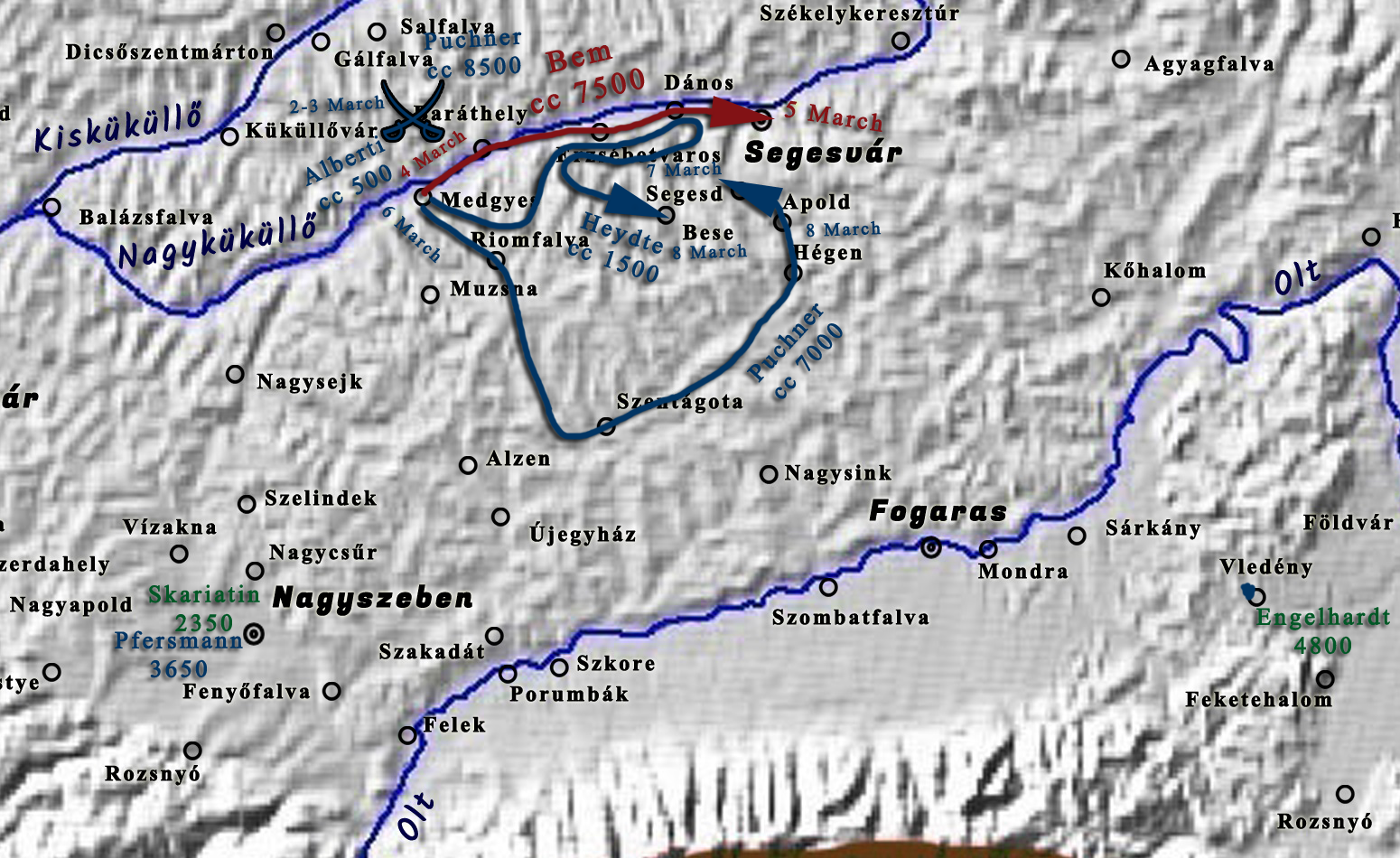
The Transylvanian campaign of the Hungarian War of Independence, between 4 and 8 March 1849. Red: Hungarians, Blue: Austrians, Green: Russians

Heydte reached Dános on 7 March, carried out the demonstration attack, but then, on the night of 7 to 8 March, on Puchner's orders, he marched from Dános via the Holdvilág-Erzsébetváros-Szászsáros route to Bese (today part of Dános) to cover the left flank of the main column during the planned attack on Segesvár. As Puchner had ordered three companies of the 62nd Infantry Regiment to occupy Medgyes, and Heydte had a battalion of infantry, two companies of border guards, five companies of the National Guards from Segesvár and one and a half companies of cavalry if he had remained in his original position, he could have formed a considerable obstacle to Bem's march towards Medgyes. However, Heydte's departure from Dános left the Medgyes-Segesvár-Nagyszeben route essentially uncovered.

Heydte's appearance did indeed alarm the Hungarian corps at Segesvár, but after no battle occurred, and the enemy retreated at midnight, only his abandoned campfires glowed in the night until they too went out towards dawn.

As seen above, Maroičić's operation plan was for Heydte's demonstrating detachment to lure Bem to a position between Dános and Segesvár, while Puchner's corps, behind the back of the Hungarians, would take Segesvár.

But for this to succeed, the demonstration at Dános should have taken place on the 8th, and not on the 7th, but before Bem could get news of the Austrian corps' approach. If the Hungarians didn't send scouts towards the south, Puchner might have been able to slip behind them undetected. But Bem was not so careless.

Maroičić, as can be seen from the plan, wanted to deploy Heydte's detachment in two directions, namely at Dános and Bese, but which, in the end, could not be sent either here or there, all the less so because he had not received any new orders to postpone the feigned attack until 8 March.

Puchner's bypassing column was thus thoroughly delayed on unpaved roads, in terrible weather conditions, thus on 8 March its brigades only reached Hégen and Apold. Because of the exhaustion of the soldiers, Puchner gave his troops a rest, and the two brigades at Hégen did not leave for Segesvár until the morning of the 9th, and Van der Nüll's advance brigade from Apold departed only after their arrival at noon that day.

== Prelude ==
On the 8th, Bem had a clear view of the situation, which showed that the Austrians would not attack from Medgyes with any greater force, because according to the reports he received, most of Puchner's corps was approaching from the south.

Bem now was certain that, the nearest part of Puchner's corps was 15 1/2 and its farthest part 22 kilometers from Segesvár, so he decided to undertake the daring operation of leaving the town, marching through Medgyes and Szelindek, and quickly attacking and occupying Nagyszeben before Puchner could intervene. Puchner, because to the aforementioned rest from exhaustion of his troops, started his march on the morning of the 9th, just as Bem was leaving Segesvár. Without this rest he might have succeeded in surrounding Bem.

The Hungarian success depended primarily on how fast the corps was moving, whether the enemy was directly behind it, and how long it would take to occupy Nagyszeben.

So on the morning of 9 March Bem's troops left Segesvár.

The Van der Nüll brigade left Apóld at noon on the 8th, where it waited for the other two brigades to approach, and therefore did not arrive to the vicinity of Segesvár until late afternoon, towards dusk: here it exchanged a few shots with the remaining Hungarian troops. The brigade's Staff Officer writes that Colonel Van der Nüll wanted to persuade the Corps' Chief of Staff to occupy Segesvár immediately. The latter, however, perhaps because Puchner had also held it back, was reluctant, and so the brigade received orders only at 9 p.m. to push into the town, which, according to the news received, had already been abandoned by the Hungarians that morning. Puchner with the Stutterheim brigade did not enter Segesvár until 2 a.m. on the 10th, and the Uracca brigade, together with the cavalry, moved in at 4 a.m., while the small Hungarian guard retreated towards Székelykeresztúr. Puchner did not understand the gravity of the situation at all. According to the military historian Jenő Gyalókay, when it turned out that there were no Hungarian soldiers in Segesvár, at 10 a.m. on 10 March Puchner was still of the opinion that Bem was either marching to Medgyes, to Kolozsvár or to Marosvásárhely, and therefore he did not decide anything for the time being, because he was waiting for news of the approach of the troops of Malkowski and Colonel Karl von Urban and wanted to plan his further actions in concordance to their positions. But also on 10 March at 5 p.m., he wrote to Lieutenant General Alois Pfersmann von Eichtal, head of the garrison from Nagyszeben, that according to the latest reports, part of the Hungarian army was moving towards Medgyes and that it may happen that Bem wanted to scare the garrison of Nagyszeben. So, as he wrote further, to prevent this very unlikely event to happen, he will march with his whole army through Riomfalva towards Nagyszeben.

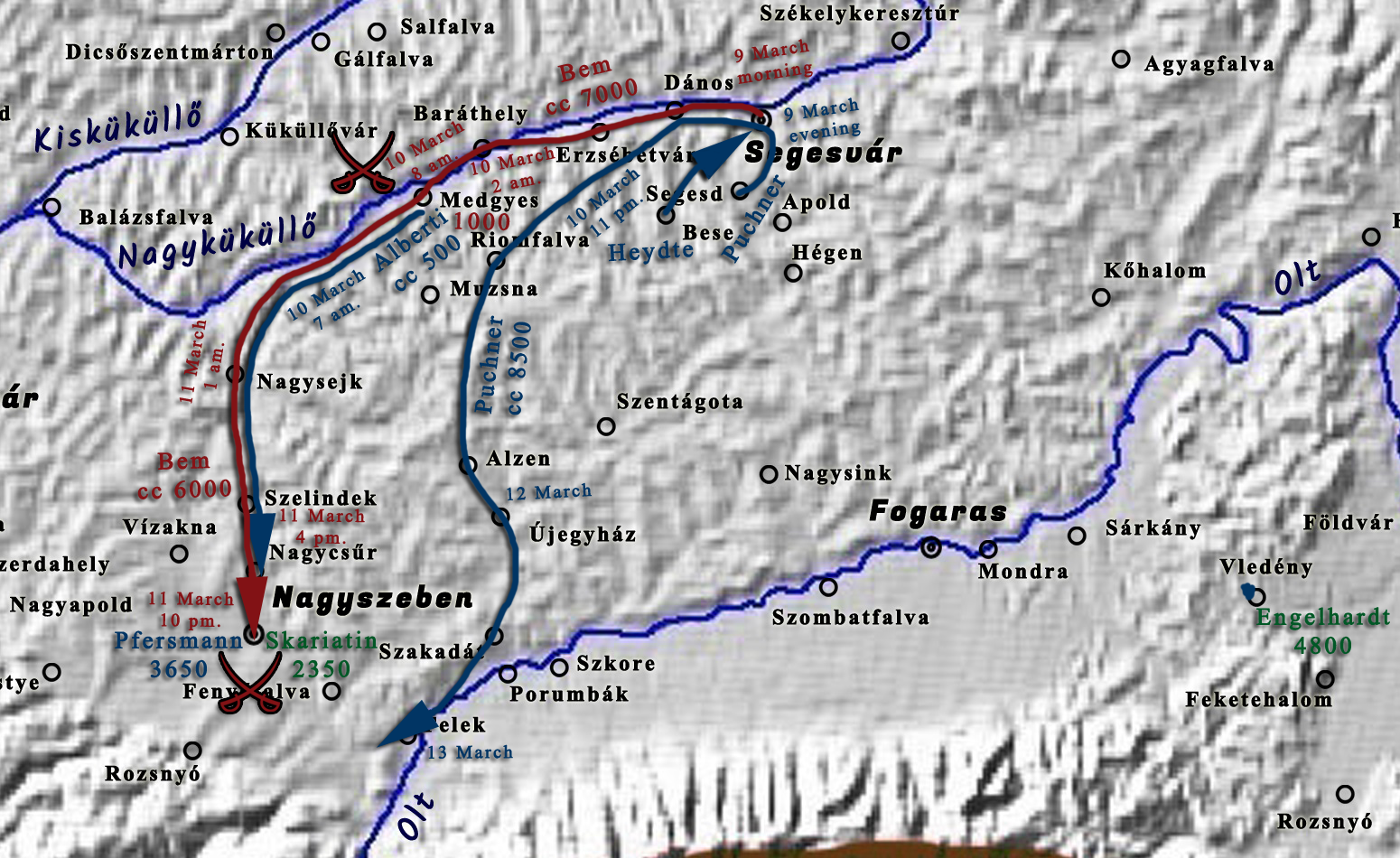
The Transylvanian campaign of the Hungarian War of Independence, between 9 and 13 March 1849. Red: Hungarians, Blue: Austrians, Green: Russians

According to Puchner's calculation, Bem could not attack this city before 12 March; and its Russian and Austrian garrisons could successfully defend it for at least 24 hours.

According to Heydte, the Austrian corps left Segesvár at 11 o'clock at night on the 10th, while according to Kalliány, 2 hours later. However, the Van der Nüll brigade, which was again put as advance guard, had already reached Dános during the morning. There the whole corps turned off the road from Segesvár to Medgyes and headed for Újegyház via Berethalom and Riomfalva, partly because this road was somewhat shorter than the other, and partly because the Austrians feared that Bem had destroyed the bridges behind him and tried to hold up Puchner's corps by occupying certain strategic points. The question was whether the Hungarian army would be able to take Nagyszeben before the pursuers arrived, or whether it would be destroyed in the ring of the defenders and pursuers.

Bem's troops reached Baráthely in torrential rain, drenched to the skin, at 2 a.m. on the 10th, and at 8 a.m. Medgyes, where three companies of the Austrian 62nd Infantry Regiment remained after Puchner's victory from 3 March. This garrison was joined, on the evening of the 9th, by Captain Alberti's scout troop. The Austrian outposts were stationed between Medgyes and Baráthely, and here they had a small skirmish with the Hungarian advance unit; but no serious fighting took place, for the Austrian troops withdrew from Medgyes towards Nagyszeben at 7 o'clock on the morning of the 10th. However, First Lieutenant Henter, who had been sent to Nagyekemező, was taken prisoner by the Hungarians along with 30 of his men.

Franz Neuhauser Nagyszeben (Hermannstadt-Sibiu) 1840

Bem left behind 1000 rearguards at Medgyes, while others say 1500 soldiers and 4 guns, led by Lieutenant Colonel Pereczy. In addition, as a mobile flank defence, Bem sent a detachment led by Lieutenant-Colonel Count Gergely Bethlen towards Dános-Váldhíd-Berethalom-Musna-Ivánfalva-Kiskapus at noon on the 9th. Bem's army arrived at Nagyselyk at 1 a.m. on 11 March, and after some rest continued on its way to Szelindek. From here he departed at noon, on the way he scattered a Russian Cossack troop and reached Nagycsűr. Towards 4 p.m. he marched out from Nagycsűr, at its southern exit, behind the Alter Berg (Old Hill), which separates this village from Nagyszeben, and here he deployed his army in battle formation.

In 1849, Nagyszeben was the most important city in Transylvania for the imperials. It was the headquarters of the Austrian troops from Transylvania called General-Commando and the main armament and equipment depot of the Transylvanian K.u.K. Corps, where a lot of clothing, weapons and ammunition, as well as all kinds of other war material were stockpiled. The Königsboden (King's Land) where the most Transylvanian Saxons lived, and which's center was Nagyszeben, also provided plenty of men for the war, and so this region was in fact the base of operations for the Austrian corps in Transylvania. Its importance was increased by the fact that at the beginning of February Windisch-Grätz authorized Puchner to retreat to Wallachia if necessary. The Vöröstorony (Red Tower) Pass, the most easily accessible link between Transylvania and Wallachia, has its northern entrance below Nagyszeben: the loss of this city could cut off this route and force the Austrian army, which might be forced to leave Transylvania, to take the Törcsvár or Tömös Pass by a long detour.

On 10 March, in the afternoon, Puchner himself had already thought - though he did not really believe - that Bem could attack Nagyszeben. He, therefore, marched towards it, confident that the city was adequately prepared and well-equipped for defense, and would be able to defend itself until the arrival of the Austrian relief corps. It was surrounded by a strong and high circular wall, interrupted by towers, and in 1702 King Leopold I ordered the construction of a citadel with a bastioned façade. By 1777, only traces of this fortress, built of earth, remained. In the course of time, parts of the city walls were demolished and it was only in November 1848 that the reconstruction of Nagyszeben was started, in order to become a defensible fortress.

It was no perimeter wall on the southeast side of the town. A temporary fortification - with an earth and pile wall - compensated for its absence. The Szeben river, which flows on one side of the city center, replaced the main ditch. The suburbs were surrounded by earthworks and their surroundings were artificially flooded, where it was possible, with the swollen water of the river. Every street in the town leading to the defenses was blocked off with a pile barrier or barricade. The perimeter walls were equipped for the positioning of cannons on them; defensive corridors were built around them and embrasures were cut into them.

So everything seemed to be in place for the successful defense of the city, and Puchner was not unreasonably confident that Bem would not be able to take Nagyszeben in less than 24 hours.

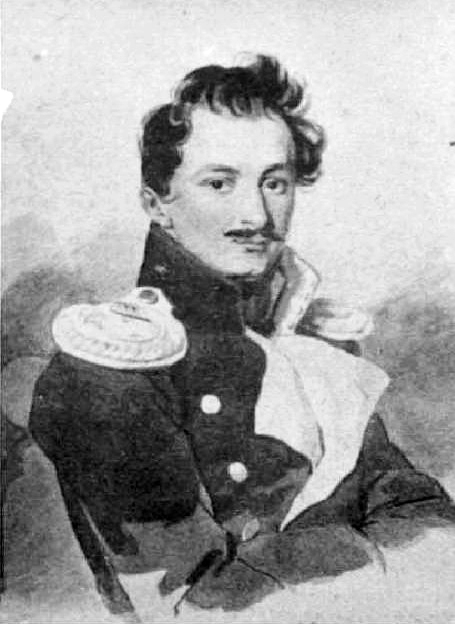
Grigory Skaryatin

The battlefield of 11 March was divided into three distinct parts. The first is the Alter Berg and its immediate surroundings, the second was the small plain between the Alter Berg and Nagyszeben, and the third was the city itself.

Nagycsűr was built in the Krummbach stream's valley. On its southern side, Alter Berg rose more than 100 meters above the village, and the slope towards Nagyszeben was covered with vineyards. The rest of the hill was barren. The plain at the southern foothills, interspersed with small willows and serving mainly as a pasture, in addition to several waterways, was crisscrossed by draining ditches in all directions, which were hindering, in particular, the rapid movement of cavalry and artillery.

On the afternoon of March 10, the Austrian troops retreating from Medgyes brought the alarming news of Bem's approach. The leader of the Russian troops at Nagyszeben, Colonel Grigory Skariatin, at 5 p.m. that afternoon, launched a battalion and two cannons each at Szelindek and Vízakna, not being sure of the direction of Bem's attack. At the same time, he ordered his troops stationed at Nagytalmács to come to Nagyszeben, and they arrived during the night. On the 11th the Russian battalion sent to Szelindek withdrew from the Hungarians without a fight, and together with the battalion sent to Vízakna retreated towards Nagyszeben.

At the same time, Pfersmann urgently wrote to Puchner that the situation in Nagyszeben was indeed critical and that the city would not be able to resist Bem's army for long. He, therefore, asked for urgent help.

However, Lieutenant-General Pfersmann and Colonel Grigory Skariatin did not seem too worried about Bem's troops, and, somewhat overconfident, instead of remaining behind the city walls, they marched out in front of them, did not occupy the city defenses, nor did they use the artillery on the walls. This may have been due to the fact that the commanders of the forces defending Nagyszeben, hearing of Bem's defeat at Medgyes, believed that the disorganized units of the defeated army had arrived in front of the city, and they hoped to give them the coup de grâce.

The Hungarian army that arrived under Nagyszeben had covered 85 kilometers in 53 hours, so they could not be called well-rested by any meaning.

=== Opposing forces ===
Bem had around 4,500-4,700 soldiers, the total number of the army defending the city was around 6000.

The composition of the Troops from Nagyszeben, as can be seen from the official report of 1 April 1849, was as follows:

Russian detachment Leader: Colonel Grigory Skariatin

- 3 companies of the Modlin infantry regiment;
- 6 companies of the Lublin infantry regiment;
- 4 companies of the Zamoście infantry regiment;
- 2 1/2 Cossack companies;
- 7th light battery;
- 8th light battery.

Total: 2,000 infantry, 350 cavalry, 8 cannons.

Austrian troops: Leader: Lieutenant General Alois Pfersmann

- 2 rookie companies of the 31 infantry regiment;
- 6 reserve companies of the 51 infantry regiment;
- 3 companies of the 62 infantry regiment;
- 1 rookie company of the 16 border guard regiment;
- 1 company of the 3rd chevau-léger regiment;
- 2 platoons of the 11. Székely hussar regiment.

Total: 3,000 infantry, 40 + ? cavalry.

Saxon national guards:

- 2 battalions of the Saxon national guards;

Total: 650 infantry.

There were at least 21 cannons for the defense of the walls of the inner city.

Garrison total: cc. 6,000 soldiers, 4 cavalry companies, 29 cannons.

The Hungarian army was composed as it follows:

Army section	Unit	Infantry company	Cavalry company	Cannons	Men
Bem's main column	3. battalion of the 37. (Michael) Line Infantry Regiment	6	-	-	800
Bem's main column	24. Honvéd battalion	6	-	-	?
Bem's main column	55. Honvéd battalion	6	-	-	800
Bem's main column	72. Honvéd battalion (Torontál mobile national guard battalion)	4	-	-	533
Bem's main column	2. battalion of the 14. infantry regiment (later 77. Honvéd battalion)	5	-	-	712
Bem's main column	3. battalion of the 14. infantry regiment (later 78. Honvéd battalion)	1	-	-	132
Bem's main column	Vienna Legion	1	-	-	?
Bem's main column	8. (Koburg) Hussar Regiment	-	2	-	300
Bem's main column	10. (Wilhelm) Hussar Regiment	-	1	-	120
Bem's main column	15. (Mátyás) Hussar Regiment	-	1	-	100
Bem's main column	Artillery	?	-	26–30	-
Bem's main column	Total	29	4	26-32	3,497 + ?
Lieutenant Colonel Gergely Bethlen's detachment	11. Honvéd battalion	6	-	-	350
Lieutenant Colonel Gergely Bethlen's detachment	5–6. companies of the 1. Honvéd Jäger battalion	2	-	-	?
Lieutenant Colonel Gergely Bethlen's detachment	6. (Württenberg) Hussar Regiment	-	2	-	300
Lieutenant Colonel Gergely Bethlen's detachment	1. Székely six-pounder battery	-	-	4	?
Lieutenant Colonel Gergely Bethlen's detachment	Total	8	2	4	650 + ?
Major Károly Kabos's detachment	3. battalion of the 14. infantry regiment (later 78. Honvéd battalion)	4	-	-	527
Grand total		41	6	30-36	4,674 + ?

== Battle ==
=== The open battle ===
Skariatin himself now set off with the rest of his troops to occupy the top of the Alten Berg; but he was too late, and settled at the foot of the hill, instead of taking the roof. Only a single line of skirmishers pushed up the slope into the vineyards; but the bulk of the infantry, with their right flank against the base of the hill, was on the eastern side of the highway to Nagycsűr. The artillery was deployed near the highway, with the Cossacks on the left, near the Krummbach. The second battle line, in Pfersmann's report, was formed by the combined Austrian battalion led by Captain Count Heusenstamm. The defenders were thus developed to fight on the plain to the north of the city, at the bottom of the heights of Nagycsűr, with the Imperial troops to the east of the main road.

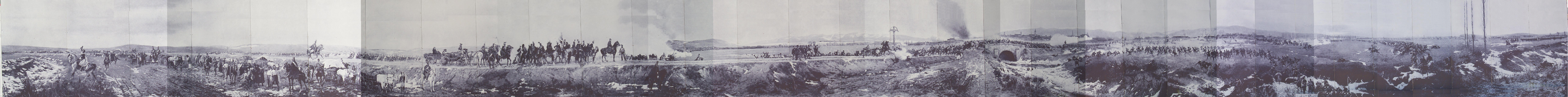
Transylvanian Panorama depircting the Second Battle of Nagyszeben - Jan Styka

The Saxon National Guards remained in the town as a reserve, and defense force of the city for the protection of which, as Pfersmann claimed in his report, all the measures were taken. The Saxon National Guard was united in the main square of the town and the castle cannons were provided with cannoneers. The ammunition stored in the warehouses was placed on the ammunition carts, just in case, and the war chest was sent towards the Vöröstorony Pass.

It was 4 o'clock in the afternoon when Bem's infantry, having reached the top of the Alter Berg Hill from Nagycsűr, caught sight of the enemy in battle formation.

Second Battle of Nagyszeben 11.03.1849. The situation between 4 and 5 p.m.

Bem, who deployed his artillery on the high ground along the highway, as usual, poured in a tremendous artillery barrage on the enemy troops positioned in front of the town. The Russian infantry withstood this relatively well, and for the moment his skirmish line between the vines has not faltered either. Skariatin sent his Cossacks to attack the Hungarian right flank, in order to bypass it from the rear, but the grapeshot of the Hungarian artillery put them in disorder, causing them to flee in panic. The Hungarian artillery inflicted so much damage on the Cossacks that they could not be used against the Hungarians in the rest of the battle. Bem now ordered the center and right wing to advance and pressed more and more infantry against the enemy's left flank, advancing on the slope of the Pfaffenbrunn hill, intending to bypass it. However, Skariatin saw what was happening and before the encirclement could take place, at 5 p.m., he retreated to a second position between Alten Berg and Nagyszeben. Bem's troops immediately descended from the hill, then the artillery duel started again.

Second Battle of Nagyszeben 11.03.1849. The situation between 5 and 7 p.m.

On Bem's orders, the Mátyás hussars attacked in the direction of Szenterzsébet (Hammersdorf), the Koburg and Wilhelm hussars led by Lieutenant-Colonel Kiss, attacked the left flank of the Russian army, while the rookie Székely infantry, some of whom, because of the shortage of rifles, had only spears, launched a bayonet charge against the enemy's center.

Seeing that both of his flanks were threatened by encirclement, as early as 6 a.m., Skariatin ordered the retreat to the entrenched suburbs.

Battle of Hermannstadt - sketched by Capt. Ed. Scheifele

At the same time, Lieutenant-Colonel Sándor Kiss with the Coburg and Wilhelm Hussars attacked the Russian battery which was covering the retreat of the troops, and forced it to withdraw.

Major General Artur Nepokoychitsky describes the retreat of the Russian troops as follows: The retreat was carried out in exemplary order despite the persistent pursuit of the Hungarians. The infantry stopped several times and charged the enemy with bayonets. In the meantime, it had become so dark that the enemy's columns could no longer be seen, and even the line of attack was only indicated by rifle fire. It was feared that our columns, bravely repulsing the advancing enemy with their bayonets, would become so involved in the fight that the enemy would cut them off, so Colonel Skariatin himself led the bayonet charges, and did not allow our soldiers to venture too far.

The combined Austrian battalion led by Lieutenant General Pfersmann, apart from a few aimless movements behind the front line, had done nothing so far. Now, however, the 20th Company of the 51st Infantry Regiment occupied the barricaded eastern gate of the suburb, while the 19th Company, which was slightly behind, stood in reserve.

=== The Siege ===
The battle continued at the suburb's defenses, the Hungarians trying to enter the city. After an hour's fighting - at 7 pm - despite the Hungarian troops had taken the outlying houses, their attack had stalled there for the time being. The Honvéds were exhausted by the long march, followed by the battle, and the darkness prevented any orientation; and Gergely Bethlen's long-awaited detachment, which had arrived at Kiskapus only on the morning of the 11th, was nowhere to be seen. Hosszabb szünet állott be.

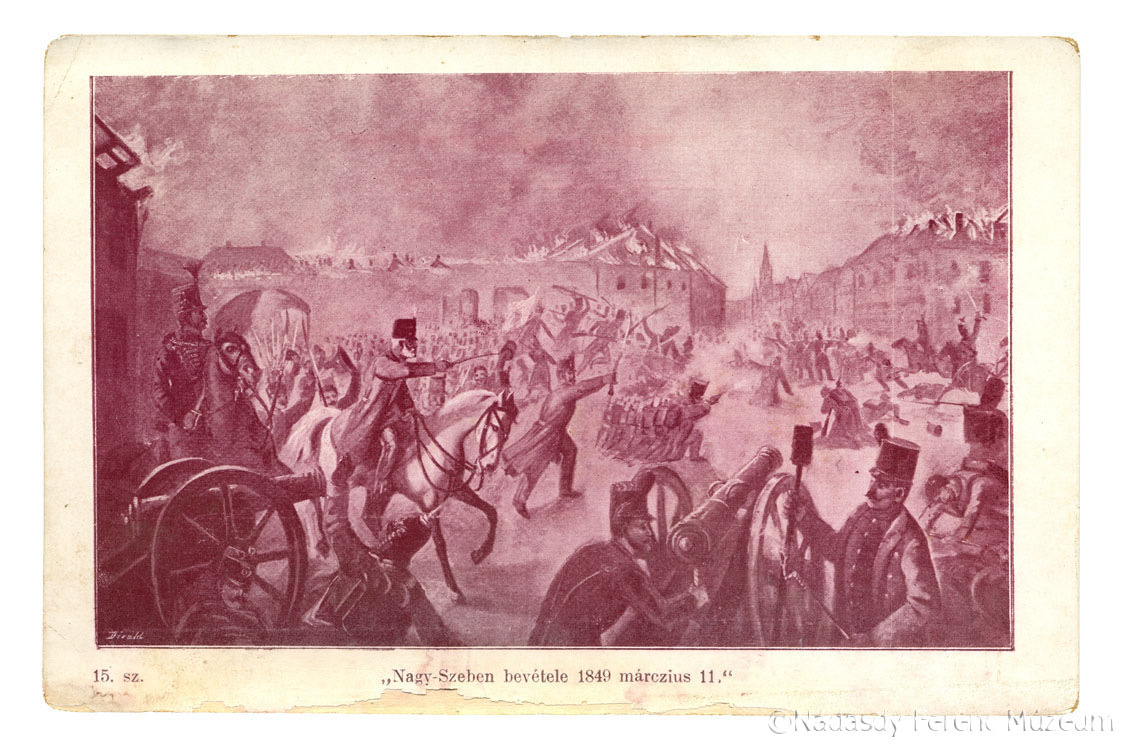
Siege of Nagyszeben - postcard from the Period of the Dualism

In the meantime, Bem's artillery was shelling the city. Bem was about to postpone the siege until the next day, when the reserve brigade of about 850–1,000 men and 4 guns, led by Colonel Gergely Bethlen, finally arrived, with a Székely battalion, the 11th Honvéd battalion and a Jäger squadron. Mr. Major, do you want to sleep in Nagyszeben today? asked Bem to the unit's commander, Olivér Bethlen. Yes, and my battalion has the same wish, Bethlen replied. Well, then, go on the attack with your battalion and stand up in the square, Bem said, as if nothing could be more normal.

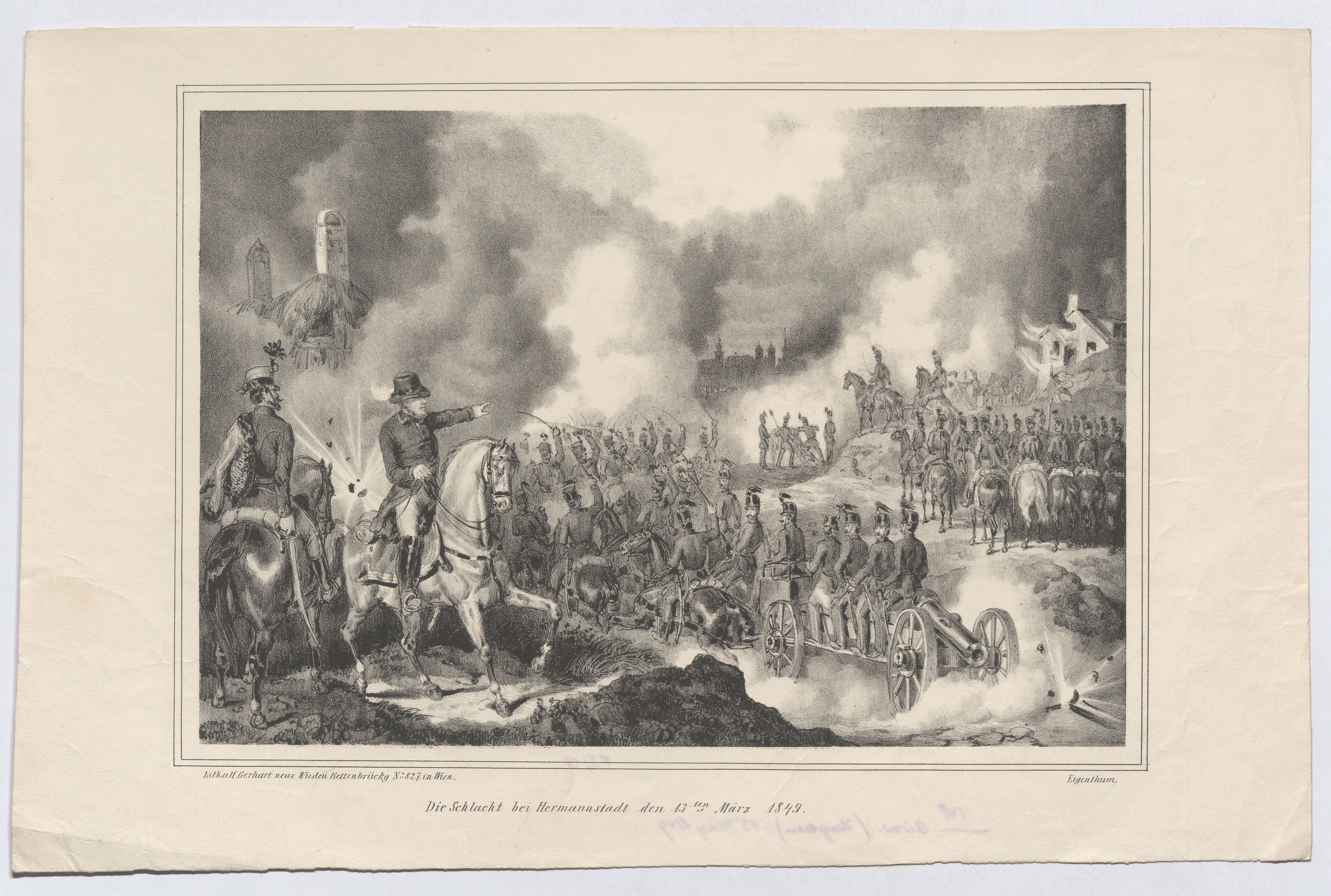
Heinrich Gerhart - Battle of Nagyszeben 11 March 1849 - Wien Museum Online Sammlung 88629 1-2

Bem immediately directed Bethlen's detachment to the left flank of the Hungarian army, and then ordered his troops to attack the outskirts. But here there was a near-fatal mix-up among the troops. For in the total darkness, it was impossible to distinguish friend from foe, and so it happened that some of the left wing's troops which remained behind blindly shot into Bethlen's battalions, which were ahead of them, thinking that they were enemy soldiers. Fortunately, Hussar Colonel Sándor Kiss, who recognized the danger that could result from this, somehow brought order and calm among the troops, by stopping the senseless shooting.

In the meantime, some houses in the suburbs had been set on fire by the Hungarian grenades, so due to this, now it was easier to see. But now the firelight also benefited the city's defenders by illuminating the attackers. But this could not stop the assault troops, which had gained new momentum and were led by the 11th Honvéd Battalion. It was joined by the Máriássy Battalion, a Székely battalion, and part of the Debrecen Jägers. Soon the 4 companies of the 3rd Battalion of the 14th Border Guard Regiment, about 520-530 men, led by Major Károly Kabos, arrived and they also joined the attack.

The veteran soldiers of the 11th and the Máriássy battalions went on the attack, singing war songs and showing death-defying courage. On two occasions, the attack was repulsed by the defenders' rifle fire, until finally a third time, which succeeded. Captain Miklós Szigeti, commander of the 11th (Kolozsvár) battalion, distinguished for their bravery shown in numerous earlier battles, with the red caps which they wore, wrote the following about their decisive attack: "Let's go, Hungarian! Long live the homeland!" - rang out in the darkness painted red by flames, and with this cry the whole mass rushed forward with their bayonets, climbing the ramparts with incredible speed, breaking the main gate, mowing down the enemy gunners beside their guns (...) and all this happened as if by magic. Skariatin renounced to further defense of the suburbs, and evacuated them, retreating to the upper town. There, at the great barracks, at the outer end of the street towards Vöröstorony, he gathered his troops, joined also by the Austrian soldiers.

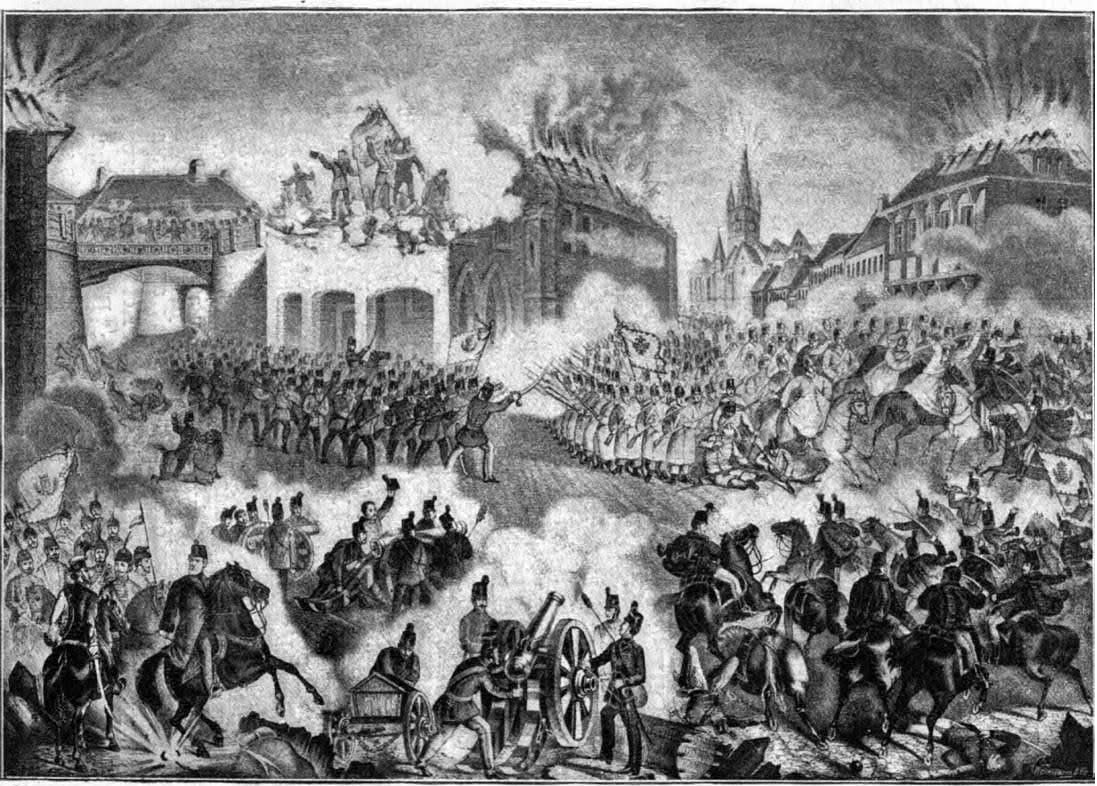
The capture of Nagyszeben on 11 March 1849 - György Gracza

To the success of the Hungarian assault also contributed the fact that the stalemate of Bem's troops at 7 pm and the temporary cessation of the attacks led the defenders to wrongly believe, that the siege would continue the next day. It was precisely for this reason that the Saxon National Guard was dispersed and the city walls were not properly defended. The Saxon garrison in the walled inner city, which was destined to defend the main square, was sent home, allegedly on the news that Bem's 7 o'clock attack on the city had failed, without any provision being made for closing and guarding the gates.

Second Battle of Nagyszeben 11.03.1849. The situation between 7 and 12 p.m.

Thus the Hungarians were able to enter the inner city through two gates without any resistance.

Major General Artur Nepokoychitsky describes the retreat as follows: The detachment, which had been hard pressed all the time, reached the gate towards Vízakna at 10 o'clock in the evening... Shortly afterward, flames broke out in several places in the suburbs, and even in our rear, on the other side of the town, on the road to Vöröstorony, which forced Colonel Skariatin to march quickly through the town towards [the city's entrance from the direction of] Vöröstorony. The commander of the detachment, after sending the artillery under the cover of ten infantry regiments, himself remained behind with a battalion in the rearguard, and engaged the advancing enemy, first at the city gate and then in pursuit [by the Hungarians] through the suburbs towards Vízakna, sometimes with bayonets and sometimes in hand-to-hand combat.

The retreat, in the narrow streets of the city, soon degenerated into a dangerous stampede. The darkness, dispersed from time to time only by the flash of shells exploding here and there and the flames from burning houses, was not a source of encouragement. Skariatin's troops did not want to remain in the rear; this undesirable role was intended for the Austrian soldiers, whom the Russians, therefore, sought to bypass, even by force. Only on the other side of the city was the order restored, but there was no question of either the Russians or the Austrians trying to resist there.

On the following morning, the Russo-Austrian troops retreated as far as Nagytalmács, at the narrow entrance to the Vöröstorony Pass, and smaller Imperial detachments as far as Zóod and Talmacsel (today parts of the same city), where they remained, without being attacked, until 16 March. Nagyszeben was in Bem's hands already between 9 and 10 p.m.

== Aftermath ==
In terms of casualties, Bem's report seems completely unbelievable, as it indicates that only 5 soldiers of the Hungarian corps were killed and 35 wounded in the battle, which lasted more than 5 hours. Other sources put Hungarian casualties at 40 dead and 98 wounded, which may be closer to the truth. By their own account, the Russians had 99 dead and 104 wounded. The British Consul-General in Bucharest Robert Gilmour Colquhoun reports 97 dead, 150 wounded, and 154 missing Russians. The, probably smaller, losses of the Austrians and the Saxon National Guards are unknown.

The booty taken by the Hungarians was very considerable. According to the contemporary historian László Kővári, 21 cannons, 1 million rifle cartridges, 6,000 cannonballs, 5,000 small guns (probably rifles), 150 hundredweight of gunpowder, large quantities of food and clothing, and among other things the cannon battery that the Hungarians lost at Vízakna. Lieutenant-Colonel B. Berger and Major Teichert, 14 officers, 115 enlisted men were taken prisoners; 850 sick [soldiers] were left behind in the hospitals, among them 123 wounded Russians."

Besides this, Nagyszeben was also the headquarters of the General-Commando, the Saxon movement, and of the Romanian National Committee, both hostiles to the Hungarian revolutionary government. Therefore, the documents left behind of all of these fell prey to the Hungarians.

In addition to these, Hungarian men and women prisoners and hostages, who had been rounded up by the Austrians during the Austrian rule in Transylvania and held as prisoners in the monasteries and convents of the city, were also freed.

The mayor of the town had previously offered a 3000 forint bounty on Bem's head, and now Bem went to him, offering himself for the reward: Well, Mr. Mayor, here I am, I brought myself here, I want the three thousand forints. The [frightened] mayor half-consciously paid the sum to the commander-in-chief, who then distributed the money among his soldiers. Nagyszeben did not get away that easily. It had to pay 100,000 silver forints for military uniforms, to provide 50 pairs of equipped horses, and to produce the following items of uniform: 3,600 atillas, 5,700 trousers, and the same number of pairs of boots, 6,000 hats, and 10,000 shirts and underpants.

So the victory also had the character of avengement. For Bem for the defeat on 21 January, for the Hungarian army for the fall of the city that had joined forces with all the enemies of the Hungarian revolution, not only the Habsburg power but also Tsarist Russia. Bem also reprimanded Nagyszeben for calling in the Russian troops, but, true to his well-known amnesty policy, he promised that the Hungarian government would "cast a veil of oblivion over the past".

Bem, in his appeal to the people of Nagyszeben, written on 12 March, pointed out that the support of the Austrian army, the call-up of the Russian army, and the propaganda spread from the city, which was defamatory of the Hungarians, containing slanders and untruths, and the understandable anger of the soldiers who finally took the city, led to some robberies and atrocities (for example the killing by a hussar, "in unknown circumstances", of Joseph Benigni, the editor of the leading newspaper of Nagyszeben, the Siebenbürger Bote, who consistently called Hungarians rebels and used derogatory terms against the Hungarian army) but from now on he forbids any further violence under the most severe penalty. He also pointed out that during the previous battles, all the towns whose Saxon inhabitants, who, despite not having a positive view of the Hungarians but did not attack the Hungarian soldiers (Beszterce, Medgyes, Segesvár, Szászváros) were spared, and that the reason for the brief robberies in Nagyszeben, which lasted until his forceful intervention, was the justified anger of his soldiers at the invitation of the Russians. The appeal also stated that the Hungarian army is fighting for the freedom not only of Hungarians but also of other nationalities living in the country and that this is shown by the fact that not only Hungarians but also a large number of nationalities of all languages and religions are fighting in its ranks. You called for Russian help. This is a disgrace to the whole of Europe and a stamp of justice on our cause. This could not have been the wish of all the Transylvanian Saxons, who had been such Russophobes even a short time before. You can only clear yourselves of the accusation of this despicable act by publicly withdrawing it. Finally, he promises to "cast a veil of oblivion over the past" and to give the people of Nagyszeben the freedom to choose their officials, but they must accept the Union with Hungary, which he says meant a choice between the freedom and the knout, and promise not to invite the Russians in again. The Saxons in Nagyszeben have promised everything, including a formal protest against the Russian intervention.

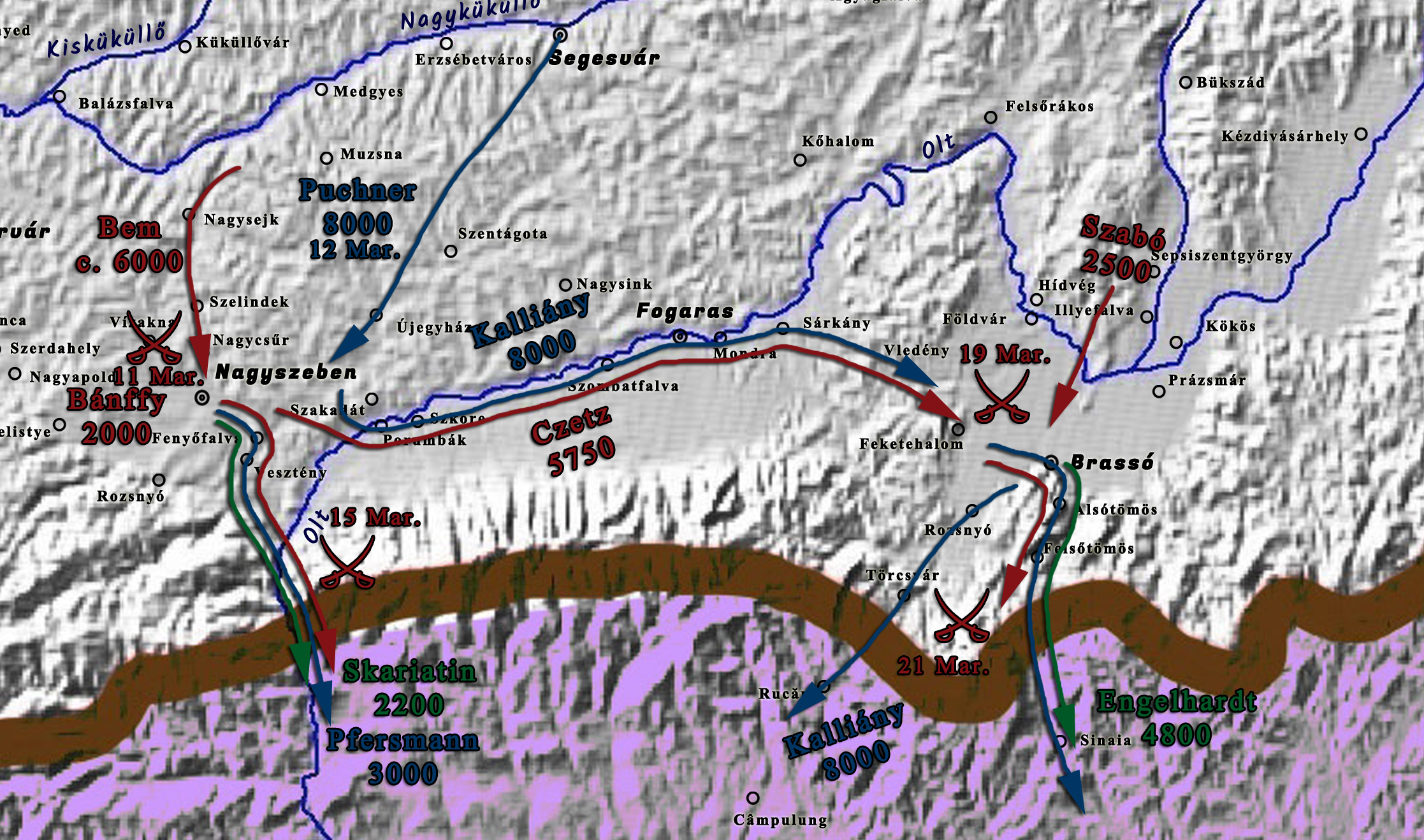
The liberation of southern Traansylvania from the Austrian and Russian forces by the Hungarian army after the Battle of Nagyszeben from 11 March 1849

Bem wanted to bring order and restore everyday life as quickly as possible, so he promised protection to all residents who were harmed, and he would bring the perpetrators of robbery or pillage to justice in a court-martial.

The new commander-in-chief of the city, Colonel Bánffy, appointed by Bem, promised, in the spirit of Bem, to protect the safety of persons and property, which he considered his main task, and asked the population that had fled to return to their homes in the city.

Before he moved out from Segesvár to Nagyszeben Bem had to expect the dangers which this bold action could bring. He had to anticipate three possible outcomes. The first was that Puchner would arrive before the assault on Nagyszeben; the second, that he would arrive during the battle; and the third, that he would arrive after the capture of the city. The first two possibilities, though unlikely, would have posed a threat to his armies, but in the end the third, the most likely, was the one that materialised.

Bem's plan of operations was based on the assumption that Puchner - either because he was late or because his fatigued troops needed rest - would not be able to intervene in time. He did not think that his opponent would be in Nagyszeben before him, nor did he expect even his arrival on the 12th, which is evident from the fact that seeing his attack losing its strength on the evening of the 11th, he was already thinking of postponing the capture of Nagyszeben until the next day.

Even if Bem had not succeeded in taking the city, his advance on Segesvár-Nagyszeben would still have had an important strategic result: to turn Puchner back towards Nagyszeben.

The main source of Bem's strength was Székely land, and as events have shown, he tried his best to keep the enemy away from this territory until the very end of the war. Puchner, on the other hand, relied on Königsboden (Királyföld), the region of Fogaras, and the Barcaság. It was Königsboden he feared the most to lose. thus, the fact that Bem, who had slipped away from Segesvár, and was marching towards Nagyszeben, forced Puchner to turn on his heel and rush to the defense of his base of operations, which was now under imminent threat. In other words, the Austrian commander did what Bem forced him to do.

And since Bem had already driven the Austrians out of the Borgó Pass, after Puchner's return the enemy no longer threatened Székely land from either direction. In contrast, the Austrian corps had to march almost 200 kilometers from Medgyes to Segesvár and from there to Nagyszeben - and all this in vain. Twice as much as Bem, who started from Segesvár with rested troops, on a much better road than the Austrians. Puchner's army was therefore much more tired, and even if he would have scored a decisive victory against Bem on 11 March, due to the exhaustion of his troops, he would have been unable to launch a major offensive operation immediately after it, which could have end the war in his favor.

All the less so because Bem's army kept growing, while his army kept shrinking. Bem did not take with him the whole Transylvanian army under Nagyszeben, and thus only a part of it, in the worst case, could be destroyed in an eventual defeat, as happened earlier in the battle of Vízakna, and later at Segesvár. However fatal a crushing defeat at Nagyszeben would have been for a part of the Transylvanian army of Bem, the fate of the campaign could not have been decided by this, but only by a successful attack on the rest of the Transylvanian army that followed immediately afterwards. Puchner, however, could not do such a thing, with his ever-dwindling army. It was only strong enough when it was in the immediate vicinity of Nagyszeben or Brassó, where it could count on the support of the Russians who did not want to venture too far from those cities.

It should be mentioned that Austrian officers involved in the campaign attributed Bem's rapid success not only to Puchner's delay but also to the serious omissions made in the defense of Nagyszeben. According to them, the city would certainly have been defensible until the arrival of the relief corps. It also appears from the description of the eyewitness Captain Rästle that not everything was done to defend Nagyszeben.

At the time, when the attacking Hungarians were stalled for lack of reinforcements, there was just enough time to pack the city walls with soldiers. Indeed, it is hard to believe that Bem could so easily overpower Nagyszeben if the defenders did not stop fighting after the first success of Gergely Bethlen's attack. Every hour that the resistance was prolonged brought the relief corps closer, so that the struggle, which was so soon interrupted, did not seem hopeless.

However, Bem had no offensive intentions until the newly recruited battalions that came with him were armed and the situation was sufficiently clarified.

On 12 March, the bulk of Puchner's army which was following Bem, reached as far as Újegyház, his vanguard as far as Alzen. Puchner himself learned of the fall of Nagyszeben in Alzen. Ironically, Lieutenant General Puchner was appointed Field Marshal on 11 March, on the very same day his career as an army leader collapsed. The news of the loss of Nagyszeben made him quite sick, so he handed over command to Major General József Kalliány. Kalliány's plan was to join forces with Skariatin to retake Nagyszeben. He therefore sent his troops to Felek and Fenyőfalva (today part of Felek) on the 13th.

Bem was right to fear that the Austrians would try to retake Nagyszeben. In his report on the battle to Lajos Kossuth, Bem wrote that he feared that Puchner would try to retake the city. He was also aware that the Austrians still had a superior force in Transylvania.

On the night following the battle, Bem equipped his around 2,000 Szekler volunteers, who had until then only spears, with bayonet rifles and supplemented from among them the 11th Honvéd and the Máriássy battalions to 1,360 soldiers. In addition to this, he called to him the troops of Bánffy and Pereczy, who had been sent out earlier with about 4,000 men, the detachment of Major Herkalovics with the 32nd and 50th Honvéd Battalions, whom he had sent to Kolozsvár, and a squadron of the 15th (Matthias) Hussar Regiment, formed in Kolozsvár, increasing his army to 14–15,000 men. On 12 March in the same afternoon, with his army, thus increased in size and reorganized, he then set up camp between Nagyszeben and Sellenberk, Lieutenant-Colonel Károlyi occupied Vesztény (today part of Sellenberk) to prevent any attempt of Russian counterattack, and also sent Lieutenant-Colonel Bethlen with a small detachment to find the bulk of the Imperial Army under Puchner, via Dolmány, Holcmány and Leschkirch (today both are parts of Újegyház), towards Erzsébetváros and Segesvár.

According to Czetz, Bethlen wanted to fight with the approaching Austrian army, but according to Kalliány, some Hungarian prisoners of war said that he wanted to return to Székely land.

The total force at Kalliány's disposal was 8,000 soldiers, not counting the Gyulafehérvár garrison and the thousands of Romanian insurgents. Skariatin was at the Vöröstorony Strait with 4,200 men, and Engelhardt at Brassó with 4,800. So he had still a much stronger force than Bem's troops. But the Russians could only be counted on in defensive fighting.

Bem left 2,000 soldiers in Nagyszeben as a garrison, and then led a brigade under Colonel János Bánffy against Skariatin in the Vöröstorony Pass. János Czetz's brigade was given the task of occupying the bridge from Felek and cutting off the connection of the K.u.K. detachment there with Skariatin. On 15 March, this order was carried out. On that day, the Bánffy Brigade led by Bem attacked the Imperial troops defending the Vöröstorony Pass, which was the rearguard of the Russians, and drove them out of Transylvania.

By 16 March, the entire Russo-Austrian from the Vöröstorony pass was already camped south to the Carpathians in Wallachia. On 16 March Czetz's brigade reached Fogaras. Kalliány regrouped his troops west of Brassó. Soon, however, he received a message from Major General Engelhardt, commander of the Russian troops in Brassó, telling him that if he was threatened by a force larger than his own, he would have to retreat to Wallachia. Kalliány then withdrew his troops to the immediate vicinity of Brassó, and decided to defend the city together with the Russians. However, when Engelhardt saw the exhausted, worn-out imperial troops, he announced that he would retreat to Wallachia, and demanded that Kalliány occupy the Tömös Strait with two brigades to ensure this. Kalliány complied with the request but weakened his main forces at Feketehalom.

The next battle took place there on 19 March. Czetz's artillery repulsed the attempts of the Imperial Infantry to attack, and after the reinforcements led by Bem broke the resistance of his left flank, the Imperial Army retreated to Brassó. During the pursuit, the imperial troops suffered heavy losses. On 20 March, the allies evacuated Brassó and retreated toward the Strait of Tömös. Bem occupied the city the same day and ordered the pursuit of the retreating troops.

On 21 March, the detachment of Lieutenant Colonel József Beke and Major Nándor Szabó caught up with the Imperial troops and made their retreat, already torturous in cold, snowy, and icy weather, even more difficult. On the same day, Major August Heydte's detachment left Transylvania through the Törcsvár Strait.

After the occupation of Brassó, Bem returned to Nagyszeben because he had received news that Skariatin was trying to invade again. On 28 March, he attacked the Russian detachment stationed at the quarantine house in the Vöröstorony strait (a building used for the medical isolation of arrivals in case of customs and epidemic danger) and drove it to Wallachia. This meant that now almost all Transylvania - with the exception of the Austrian garrisons from the fortress of Gyulafehervár, the castle of Déva, and the Érchegység Mountains in the hands of the Romanian insurrection - was in the hands of the Hungarian troops. For his triumphs Bem was awarded the First Class of the Hungarian Military Order of Merit and the rank of Lieutenant General.

The success was undoubtedly impressive, since Bem had achieved it while the opposing Austrian and Russian troops were outnumbering his troops. It is true, that the imperials could only count on the Russians in defensive battles, but Bem didn't known this. With his lightning-quick moves he divided and defeated in detail the troops of Puchner, then Kalliány, and after his defeat at Medgyes, he completely turned the tide of the war in less than two weeks. At the same time, the imperial command completely lost its head, and although the troops fought with the tenacity expected of them, they could only ameliorate the disastrous consequences of the commanders' precipitated and contradictory decisions.

== Sources ==
- Babucs, Zoltán (2021), ""Most pedig megyünk Nagyszebenbe!" ("Now we go to Nagyszeben!")", Magyarságkutató Intézet (11 March 2021) (in Hungarian)
- Bánlaky, József (2001). A magyar nemzet hadtörténelme ("The Military History of the Hungarian Nation) (in Hungarian). Budapest: Arcanum Adatbázis.
- Bóna, Gábor (2015), "A magyar forradalom és szabadságharc három pillanata. Nagyszeben bevétele, Erdély felszabadítása ("Three Moments of the Hungarian Revolution and War of Independence. The Capture of Nagyszeben. the Liberation of Transylvania")", Háromszék (14 March 2015) (in Hungarian)
- Bóna, Gábor (1987). Tábornokok és törzstisztek a szabadságharcban 1848–49 ("Generals and Staff Officers in the War of Freedom 1848–1849") (in Hungarian). Budapest: Zrínyi Katonai Kiadó. p. 430. ISBN 963-326-343-3.
- Egyed, Ákos (2010). Erdély 1848–1849 ("Transylvania in 1848-1849") (in Hungarian). Csíkszereda: Pallas-Akadémia Könyvkiadó. p. 616. ISBN 978-973-665-312-4.
- Egyed, Ákos (2013), "Nagyszeben bevétele 1849. március 11-én ("The Capture of Nagyszeben on 11 March 1849")" (PDF), Várak, kastélyok, templomok (9. évf. 4. sz. / 2013) (in Hungarian)
- Gyalókay, Jenő (1931). Az első orosz megszállás és Erdély felszabadítása ("The First Russian Occupation and the Liberation of Transylvania) (in Hungarian). Budapest: Magyar Tudományos Akadémia.
- Hermann, Róbert (2001), 1848-1849 a szabadságharc hadtörténete ("Military History of 1848-1849") (in Hungarian), Budapest: Korona, ISBN 963-9376-21-3
- Hermann, Róbert (2004). Az 1848–1849-es szabadságharc nagy csatái ("Great battles of the Hungarian Revolution of 1848-1849") (in Hungarian). Budapest: Zrínyi. p. 408. ISBN 963-327-367-6.
- Hermann, Róbert (2013). Nagy csaták. 15. A magyar önvédelmi háború ("Great Battles. 15. The Hungarian War od Self Defense") (in Hungarian). Budapest: Duna Könyvklub. p. 88. ISBN 978-615-5013-99-7.
