= Holendry Paprockie =

- Village
- Location within Poland
- Coordinates: 51°34′31″N 18°55′1″E
- Country: Poland
- Voivodeship: Łódź
- County: Zduńska Wola
- Gmina: Zapolice

Holendry Paprockie [xɔˈlɛndrɨ paˈprɔt͡skʲɛ] is a village in the administrative district of Gmina Zapolice, within Zduńska Wola County, Łódź Voivodeship, in central Poland.
