= Świerzyny =

- Village
- Location within Poland
- Coordinates: 51°33′N 18°55′E
- Country: Poland
- Voivodeship: Łódź
- County: Zduńska Wola
- Gmina: Zapolice

Świerzyny (Polish pronunciation: [ɕfjɛˈʐɨnɨ]) is a village in the administrative district of Gmina Zapolice, within Zduńska Wola County, Łódź Voivodeship, in central Poland.
