= Wygiełzów, Zduńska Wola County =

Wygiełzów
- Village
- Location within Poland
- Coordinates: 51°33′12″N 18°59′16″E
- Country: Poland
- Voivodeship: Łódź
- County: Zduńska Wola
- Gmina: Zapolice

Wygiełzów [vɨˈɡʲɛu̯zuf] is a village in the administrative district of Gmina Zapolice, within Zduńska Wola County, Łódź Voivodeship, in central Poland.
