= Jeziorko, Zduńska Wola County =

Jeziorko
- Village
- Location within Poland
- Coordinates: 51°29′51″N 18°52′3″E
- Country: Poland
- Voivodeship: Łódź
- County: Zduńska Wola
- Gmina: Zapolice

Jeziorko [jɛˈʑɔrkɔ] is a village in the administrative district of Gmina Zapolice, within Zduńska Wola County, Łódź Voivodeship, in central Poland.
