= Swędzieniejewice =

- Village
- Location within Poland
- Coordinates: 51°34′N 18°59′E
- Country: Poland
- Voivodeship: Łódź
- County: Zduńska Wola
- Gmina: Zapolice
- Population: 269

Swędzieniejewice (Polish pronunciation: [sfɛnd͡ʑɛɲɛjɛˈvit͡sɛ]) is a village in the administrative district of Gmina Zapolice, within Zduńska Wola County, Łódź Voivodeship, in central Poland.
