= Rojków, Łódź Voivodeship =

Rojków
- Village
- Location within Poland
- Coordinates: 51°32′36″N 18°57′50″E
- Country: Poland
- Voivodeship: Łódź
- County: Zduńska Wola
- Gmina: Zapolice

Rojków [ˈrɔi̯kuf] is a village in the administrative district of Gmina Zapolice, within Zduńska Wola County, Łódź Voivodeship, in central Poland.
