= Gmina Zapolice =

Gmina Zapolice Zapolice Commune
- Gmina
- Flag Coat of arms
- Interactive map of Gmina Zapolice
- Coordinates (Zapolice): 51°32′30″N 18°52′57″E
- Country: Poland
- Voivodeship: Łódź
- County: Zduńska Wola
- Seat: Zapolice

Area
  - Total: 81.11 km^{2} (31.32 sq mi)

Population (2006)
  - Total: 4,728
  - Density: 58.29/km^{2} (151.0/sq mi)
- Website: http://www.zapolice.pl/

Gmina Zapolice is a rural gmina (administrative district) in Zduńska Wola County, Łódź Voivodeship, in central Poland. Its seat is the village of Zapolice, which lies approximately 9 kilometres (6 mi) south-west of Zduńska Wola and 49 km (30 mi) south-west of the regional capital Łódź.

The gmina covers an area of 81.11 square kilometres (31.3 sq mi), and as of 2006 its total population is 4,728.

The gmina contains part of the protected area called Warta-Widawka Landscape Park.

== Villages ==
Gmina Zapolice contains the villages and settlements of Beleń, Beleń-Kolonia, Branica, Branica-Kolonia, Holendry Paprockie, Jelno, Jeziorko, Kalinowa, Marcelów, Marżynek, Młodawin Dolny, Młodawin Górny, Paprotnia, Pstrokonie, Ptaszkowice, Rembieszów-Kolonia, Rojków, Strońsko, Swędzieniejewice, Świerzyny, Woźniki, Wygiełzów, Zamoście and Zapolice.

== Neighbouring gminas ==
Gmina Zapolice is bordered by the town of Zduńska Wola and by the gminas of Burzenin, Sędziejowice, Sieradz, Widawa and Zduńska Wola.
