= Rembieszów-Kolonia =

- Village
- Location within Poland
- Coordinates: 51°30′45″N 18°54′55″E
- Country: Poland
- Voivodeship: Łódź
- County: Zduńska Wola
- Gmina: Zapolice

Rembieszów-Kolonia [rɛmˈbjɛʂuf kɔˈlɔɲa] is a village in the administrative district of Gmina Zapolice, within Zduńska Wola County, Łódź Voivodeship, in central Poland.
