= Woźniki, Zduńska Wola County =

Woźniki
- Village
- Location within Poland
- Coordinates: 51°30′40″N 18°53′23″E
- Country: Poland
- Voivodeship: Łódź
- County: Zduńska Wola
- Gmina: Zapolice

Woźniki [vɔʑˈniki] is a village in the administrative district of Gmina Zapolice, within Zduńska Wola County, Łódź Voivodeship, in central Poland.
