= Beleń-Kolonia =

- Village
- Location within Poland
- Coordinates: 51°33′20″N 18°51′48″E
- Country: Poland
- Voivodeship: Łódź
- County: Zduńska Wola
- Gmina: Zapolice

Beleń-Kolonia [ˈbɛlɛɲ kɔˈlɔɲa] is a village in the administrative district of Gmina Zapolice, within Zduńska Wola County, Łódź Voivodeship, in central Poland.
