= Marcelów, Zduńska Wola County =

Marcelów
- Village
- Location within Poland
- Coordinates: 51°33′1″N 18°54′1″E
- Country: Poland
- Voivodeship: Łódź
- County: Zduńska Wola
- Gmina: Zapolice

Marcelów [marˈt͡sɛluf] is a village in the administrative district of Gmina Zapolice, within Zduńska Wola County, Łódź Voivodeship, in central Poland.
