= Paprotnia, Zduńska Wola County =

Paprotnia
- Village
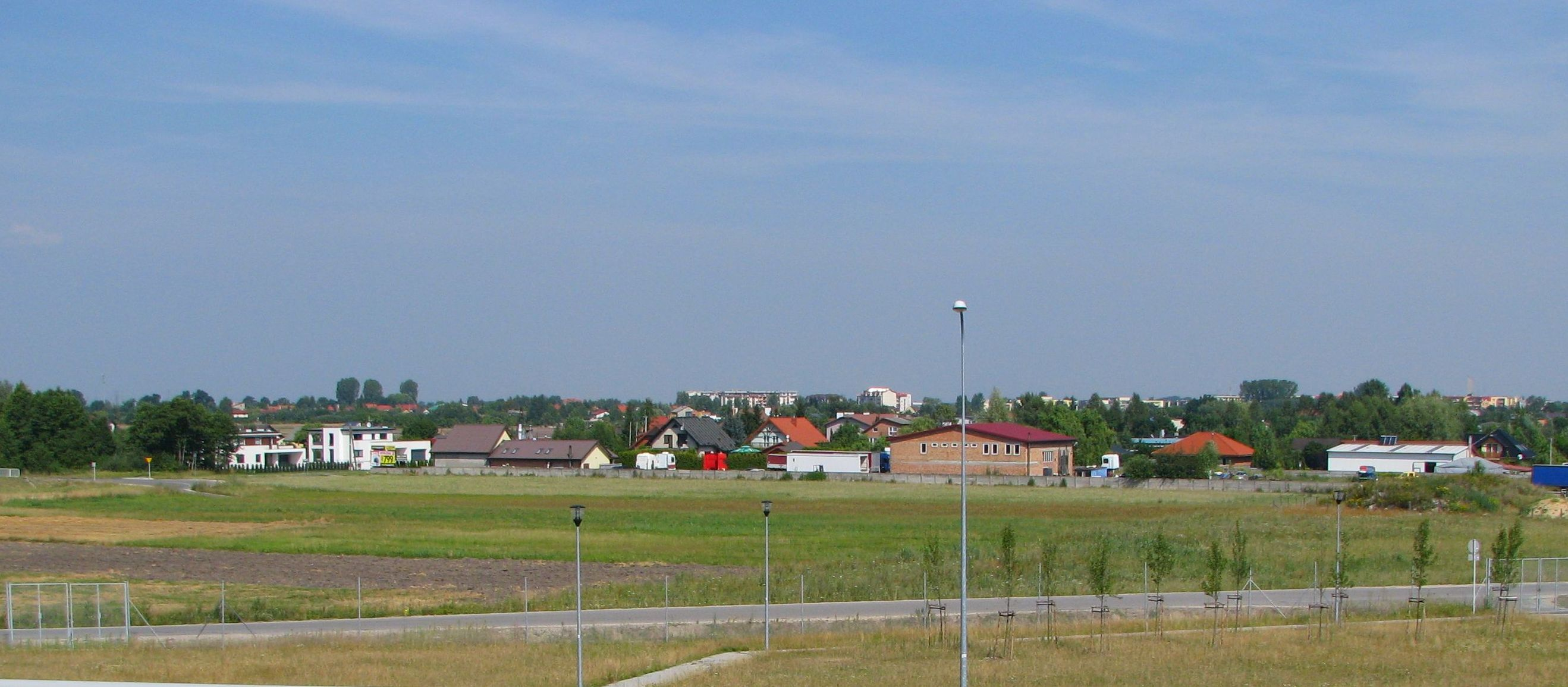

- Location within Poland
- Coordinates: 51°34′14″N 18°56′1″E
- Country: Poland
- Voivodeship: Łódź
- County: Zduńska Wola
- Gmina: Zapolice

Paprotnia [paˈprɔtɲa] is a village in the administrative district of Gmina Zapolice, within Zduńska Wola County, Łódź Voivodeship, in central Poland.
