= Młodawin Górny =

- Village
- Location within Poland
- Coordinates: 51°33′23″N 18°57′46″E
- Country: Poland
- Voivodeship: Łódź
- County: Zduńska Wola
- Gmina: Zapolice

Młodawin Górny [mwɔˈdavin ˈɡurnɨ] is a village in the administrative district of Gmina Zapolice, within Zduńska Wola County, Łódź Voivodeship, in central Poland.
