= Marżynek =

- Village
- Location within Poland
- Coordinates: 51°33′56″N 18°56′8″E
- Country: Poland
- Voivodeship: Łódź
- County: Zduńska Wola
- Gmina: Zapolice
- Population: 130

Marżynek [marˈʐɨnɛk] is a village in the administrative district of Gmina Zapolice, within Zduńska Wola County, Łódź Voivodeship, central Poland.
