= Zapolice, Zduńska Wola County =

Zapolice
- Village
- Location within Poland
- Coordinates: 51°32′30″N 18°52′57″E
- Country: Poland
- Voivodeship: Łódź
- County: Zduńska Wola
- Gmina: Zapolice
- Population: 730

Zapolice [zapɔˈlit͡sɛ] is a village in Zduńska Wola County, Łódź Voivodeship, in central Poland. It is the seat of the gmina (administrative district) called Gmina Zapolice.
