= Strońsko =

- Village
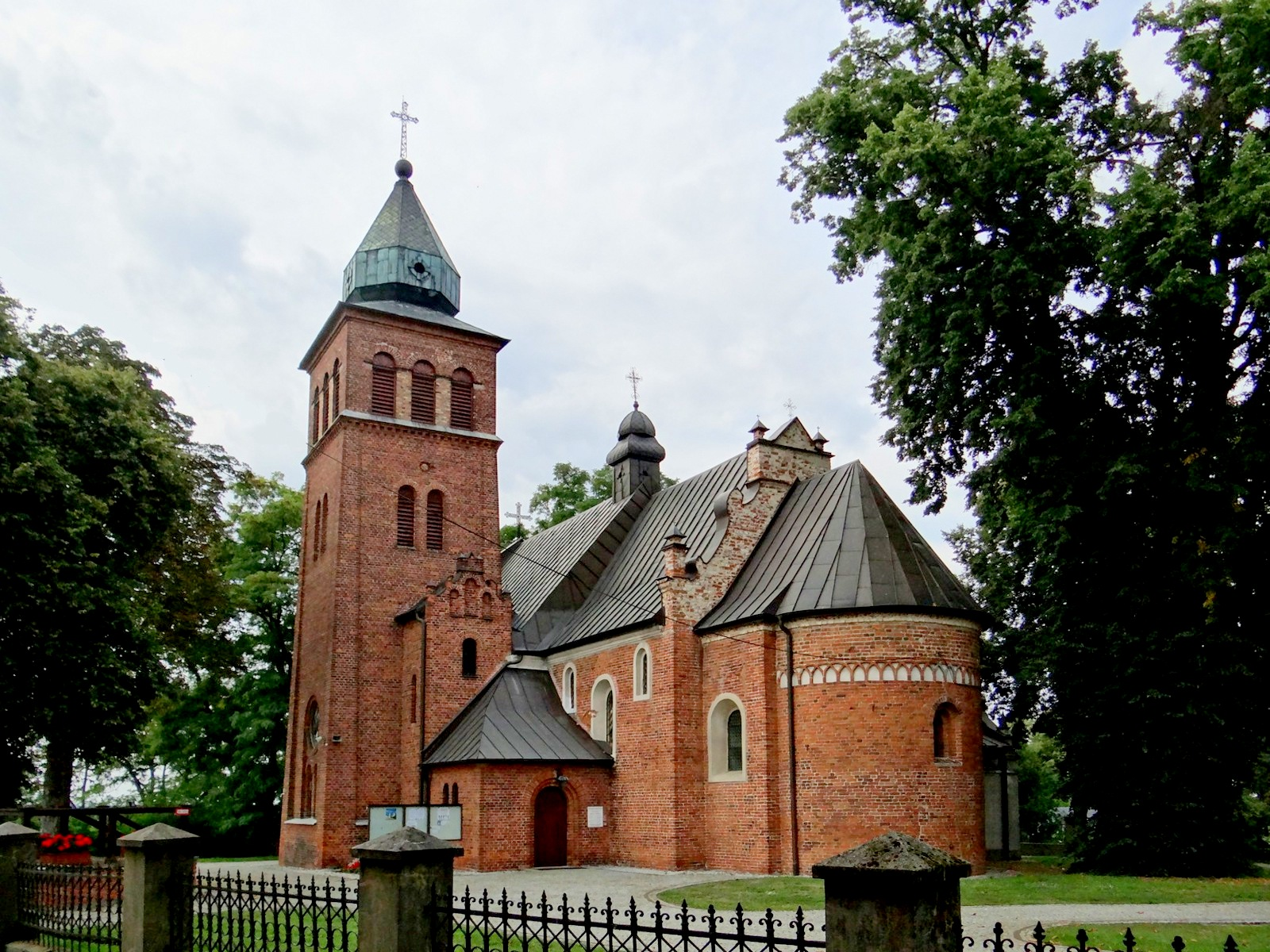
- Catholic church

- Location within Poland
- Coordinates: 51°33′N 18°52′E
- Country: Poland
- Voivodeship: Łódź
- County: Zduńska Wola
- Gmina: Zapolice

Strońsko [ˈstrɔɲskɔ] is a village in the administrative district of Gmina Zapolice, within Zduńska Wola County, Łódź Voivodeship, in central Poland.
