= Kalinowa =

Kalinowa may refer to the following places in Poland:

- Kalinowa, Lower Silesian Voivodeship (south-west Poland)
- Kalinowa, Kutno County in Łódź Voivodeship (central Poland)
- Kalinowa, Sieradz County in Łódź Voivodeship (central Poland)
- Kalinowa, Zduńska Wola County in Łódź Voivodeship (central Poland)
- Kalinowa, Greater Poland Voivodeship (west-central Poland)
