= Beleń =

- Village
- Location within Poland
- Coordinates: 51°34′N 18°51′E
- Country: Poland
- Voivodeship: Łódź
- County: Zduńska Wola
- Gmina: Zapolice

Beleń [ˈbɛlɛɲ] is a village in the administrative district of Gmina Zapolice, within Zduńska Wola County, Łódź Voivodeship, in central Poland.
