= Ptaszkowice =

- Village
- Location within Poland
- Coordinates: 51°32′N 18°57′E
- Country: Poland
- Voivodeship: Łódź
- County: Zduńska Wola
- Gmina: Zapolice

Ptaszkowice [ptaʂkɔˈvit͡sɛ] is a village in the administrative district of Gmina Zapolice, within Zduńska Wola County, Łódź Voivodeship, in central Poland.
