= Branica-Kolonia =

- Village
- Location within Poland
- Coordinates: 51°31′18″N 18°55′46″E
- Country: Poland
- Voivodeship: Łódź
- County: Zduńska Wola
- Gmina: Zapolice

Branica-Kolonia [braˈnit͡sa kɔˈlɔɲa] is a village in the administrative district of Gmina Zapolice, within Zduńska Wola County, Łódź Voivodeship, in central Poland.
