= Kalinów =

Kalinów may refer to the following places:

- Kalinów, Gmina Będków, Tomaszów County in Łódź Voivodeship (central Poland)
- Kalinów, Zgierz County in Łódź Voivodeship (central Poland)
- Kalinów, Masovian Voivodeship (east-central Poland)
