= Kalinowo =

Kalinowo may refer to the following places:

- Kalinowo, Łomża County in Podlaskie Voivodeship (north-east Poland)
- Kalinowo, Sejny County in Podlaskie Voivodeship (north-east Poland)
- Kalinowo, Zambrów County in Podlaskie Voivodeship (north-east Poland)
- Kalinowo, Gmina Ostrów Mazowiecka, Ostrów County in Masovian Voivodeship (east-central Poland)
- Kalinowo, Pułtusk County in Masovian Voivodeship (east-central Poland)
- Kalinowo, Wyszków County in Masovian Voivodeship (east-central Poland)
- Kalinowo, Lubusz Voivodeship (west Poland)
- Kalinowo, Elbląg County in Warmian-Masurian Voivodeship (north Poland)
- Kalinowo, Ełk County in Warmian-Masurian Voivodeship (north Poland)
- Kalinowo, Giżycko County in Warmian-Masurian Voivodeship (north Poland)
