= Zamoście, Łódź Voivodeship =

Zamoście
- Village
- Location within Poland
- Coordinates: 51°30′51″N 18°52′16″E
- Country: Poland
- Voivodeship: Łódź
- County: Zduńska Wola
- Gmina: Zapolice
- Population: 90

Zamoście (Polish pronunciation: [zaˈmɔɕt͡ɕɛ]) is a village in the administrative district of Gmina Zapolice, within Zduńska Wola County, Łódź Voivodeship, in central Poland.
