= Branica, Łódź Voivodeship =

Branica
- Village
- Location within Poland
- Coordinates: 51°30′39″N 18°55′33″E
- Country: Poland
- Voivodeship: Łódź
- County: Zduńska Wola
- Gmina: Zapolice
- Population: 200

Branica [braˈnit͡sa] is a village in the administrative district of Gmina Zapolice, within Zduńska Wola County, Łódź Voivodeship, in central Poland.
