= Kalinowa, Zduńska Wola County =

Kalinowa
- Village
- Location within Poland
- Coordinates: 51°29′31″N 18°55′25″E
- Country: Poland
- Voivodeship: Łódź
- County: Zduńska Wola
- Gmina: Zapolice

Kalinowa [kaliˈnɔva] is a village in the administrative district of Gmina Zapolice, within Zduńska Wola County, Łódź Voivodeship, in central Poland.
