= Rolandas Kalinauskas RK-6 Magic =

Lithuanian light aircraft

RK-6 Magic

General information
- Type: Ultralight aircraft
- National origin: Lithuania
- Manufacturer: Rolandas Kalinauskas
- Status: In production (2012)

History
- Variant: Rolandas Kalinauskas RK-7 Orange

The Rolandas Kalinauskas RK-6 Magic (or Magija) is a Lithuanian ultralight aircraft, designed and produced by Rolandas Kalinauskas, of Prienai. The aircraft is supplied as a complete ready-to-fly-aircraft.

== Design and development ==
The RK-6 was designed to comply with the Fédération Aéronautique Internationale microlight rules. It features a strut-braced high wing, a tandem two-seat enclosed cockpit under a bubble canopy, fixed tricycle landing gear and a single engine in pusher configuration.

The forward fuselage is made from welded steel with a wooden laminate covering in the cockpit area, while the tailboom is made from aluminum tubing The tail surfaces are constructed from aluminum tubing, are strut-braced and covered in Dacron sailcloth. The wings are wooden, produced by Arvydas Vaicekauskas and are equipped with Junkers-style flaperons with flap deflections of 20 and 40 degrees. Its wingspan is 10.7 m (35.1 ft) and has an area of 12.5 m^{2} (135 sq ft). The standard engine available is the 64 hp (48 kW) Rotax 582 two-stroke powerplant. The aircraft can also be flown without the canopy fitted, if desired.

== Specifications (RK-6 Magic) ==
Data from Bayerl

General characteristics

- Crew: one
- Capacity: one passenger
- Wingspan: 10.7 m (35 ft 1 in)
- Wing area: 12.5 m^{2} (135 sq ft)
- Empty weight: 270 kg (595 lb)
- Gross weight: 450 kg (992 lb)
- Fuel capacity: 50 litres (11 imp gal; 13 US gal)
- Powerplant: 1 × Rotax 582 twin cylinder, liquid-cooled, two-stroke aircraft engine, 48 kW (64 hp)
- Propellers: 2-bladed wooden, 1.6 m (5 ft 3 in) diameter

Performance

- Maximum speed: 170 km/h (110 mph, 92 kn)
- Cruise speed: 155 km/h (96 mph, 84 kn)
- Stall speed: 59 km/h (37 mph, 32 kn)
- Rate of climb: 5 m/s (980 ft/min)
- Wing loading: 36.0 kg/m^{2} (7.4 lb/sq ft)
