= Jan Kalinowski =

Polish academic (1897–1941)

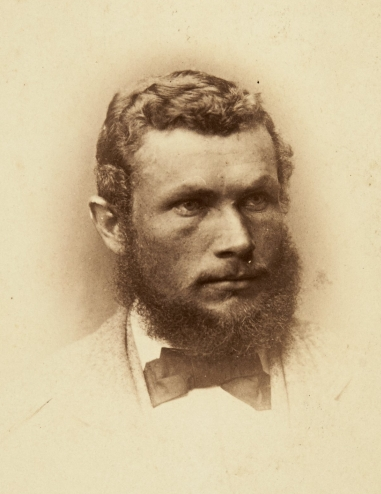

Jan Kalinowski (17 May 1857 – June 1941) was a Polish explorer and collector of biological specimens who worked in Asia and South America. He was among the first Europeans to explore the fauna of the Korean Peninsula, collecting for the Branicki family of Poland from 1885 to 1888.

== Life and work ==
Kalinowski was born in Okuniew where his father was a forester. He began to work for Władysław Taczanowski at the Zoological Museum in Warsaw. His first collecting expedition sponsored by Count Konstanty Branicki (1824–1884) was into Kamchatka with Benedict Dybowski. He stayed on from 1883 after Dybowski returned and explored Japan and Korea. He collected numerous insects and birds. The specimens he collected were examined and found to be new species by the Russian entomologist General Oktawiusz Radoszkowski. Kalinowski returned to Warsaw in 1888 and was tasked by Taczanowski to collect in Peru. Here he met and married Maria Villamonte settling in Peru. He initially stayed near Quillabamba, then Quincemil and later moved to Markapata 100 miles southeast of Cusco and set up a hacienda "La Cadena" and continued to collect specimens and sent them to museums in Europe and America. He was supported by wealthy European museum collectors including the brothers Konstanty Branicki (1824–1884) and Aleksander (1821–1877). After Konstanty's death his son Ksawery Branicki (1864–1926) continued to support collecting expeditions. Other supporters included Hans von Berlepsch.

Kalinowski died in June 1941 in Peru leaving behind his wife and eighteen children, one of whom was the naturalist, collector, and taxidermist Celestino Kalinowski Villamonte (1924 - 1986) who worked for the conservation and establishment of Manú National Park.

A number of species described from his collections have been named after him including Kalinowski's mastiff bat (Mormopterus kalinowskii Thomas, 1893), Kalinowski's Oldfield mouse (Thomasomys kalinowskii Thomas, 1894), Kalinowski's agouti (Dasyprocta kalinowskii Thomas, 1897), and Kalinowski's mouse opossum (Hyladelphys kalinowskii Hershkovitz, 1992).
