= Rolandas Kalinauskas RK-7 Orange =

Lithuanian ultralight aircraft

RK-7 Orange

General information
- Type: Ultralight aircraft
- National origin: Lithuania
- Manufacturer: Rolandas Kalinauskas
- Status: In production (2012)

History
- Developed from: Rolandas Kalinauskas RK-6 Magic

The Rolandas Kalinauskas RK-7 Orange (also called the Muse, Fly and Bite) is a Lithuanian ultralight aircraft, designed and produced by Rolandas Kalinauskas, of Prienai. The aircraft is supplied as a kit for amateur construction or as a complete ready-to-fly-aircraft and has been noted for its very low price.

== Design and development ==
A simplified single-seat version of the Rolandas Kalinauskas RK-6 Magic, the RK-7 was designed to comply with the Fédération Aéronautique Internationale microlight rules. It features a strut-braced high wing, a single-seat enclosed cockpit under a bubble canopy, fixed tricycle landing gear and a single engine in pusher configuration.

The aircraft forward fuselage is made from welded steel with a wooden laminate covering in the cockpit area, with the tailboom made from aluminum tube. The tail surfaces are built up from aluminum tubing, strut-braced, covered in Dacron sailcloth and protected with a small tailskid. The wings are wooden and equipped with Junkers style ailerons. Its 8.2 m (26.9 ft) span wing has an area of 11.5 m^{2} (124 sq ft). The standard engine available is the 50 hp (37 kW) Rotax 503 two-stroke powerplant, although the 40 hp (30 kW) Rotax 447 has also been used. The aircraft can be flown without the canopy fitted, if desired.

The RK-7 has been noted for its low retail price. In 2011 it was advertised at €11,000 for an assembled, ready-to-fly aircraft and €6,500 for a kit.

== Specifications (RK-7 Orange) ==
Data from Bayerl

General characteristics

- Crew: one
- Capacity: one passenger
- Wingspan: 8.2 m (26 ft 11 in)
- Wing area: 11.5 m^{2} (124 sq ft)
- Empty weight: 150 kg (331 lb)
- Gross weight: 250 kg (551 lb)
- Fuel capacity: 20 litres (4.4 imp gal; 5.3 US gal)
- Powerplant: 1 × Rotax 503 twin cylinder, air-cooled, two stroke aircraft engine, 37 kW (50 hp)
- Propellers: 2-bladed wooden fixed pitch, 1.6 m (5 ft 3 in) diameter

Performance

- Maximum speed: 120 km/h (75 mph, 65 kn)
- Cruise speed: 100 km/h (62 mph, 54 kn)
- Stall speed: 59 km/h (37 mph, 32 kn)
- Rate of climb: 4 m/s (790 ft/min)
- Wing loading: 21.7 kg/m^{2} (4.4 lb/sq ft)
