= 2005–06 UEFA Cup first round =

Stage of a football competition in Europe

The first round of the 2005–06 UEFA Cup was played from 15 to 29 September 2005, which narrowed clubs down to 40 teams in preparation for the group stage.

All times are CET, as listed by UEFA.

== Teams ==
The following 80 teams participated in the first round.

Key to colours
Winners of first round advanced to group stage

First round participants

| Team | Notes | Coeff. |
|---|---|---|
| (Russia) CSKA Moscow | | 34.469 |
| (Italy) Roma | | 73.191 |
| (Germany) Bayer Leverkusen | | 65.166 |
| (Netherlands) Feyenoord | | 62.145 |
| (Germany) VfB Stuttgart | | 58.166 |
| (Portugal) Sporting CP | | 55.739 |
| (France) Monaco | | 53.324 |
| (France) Auxerre | | 51.324 |
| (Turkey) Galatasaray | | 50.872 |
| (Greece) AEK Athens | | 47.715 |
| (Germany) Hertha BSC | | 46.166 |
| (Russia) Lokomotiv Moscow | | 38.469 |
| (Turkey) Beşiktaş | | 37.872 |
| (Netherlands) AZ | | 37.145 |
| (Spain) Sevilla | | 36.326 |
| (France) Marseille | | 36.324 |
| (Greece) PAOK | | 35.715 |
| (Czech Republic) Slavia Prague | | 35.223 |
| (Switzerland) Basel | | 33.887 |
| (Poland) Wisła Kraków | | 32.929 |

| Team | Notes | Coeff. |
|---|---|---|
| (England) Middlesbrough | | 32.864 |
| (Serbia and Montenegro) Partizan | | 30.012 |
| (Spain) Espanyol | | 29.326 |
| (France) Lens | | 29.324 |
| (Ukraine) Shakhtar Donetsk | | 28.200 |
| Austria Wien | | 27.208 |
| (Netherlands) Heerenveen | | 26.145 |
| (Austria) GAK | | 25.208 |
| (Spain) Osasuna | | 24.326 |
| (Ukraine) Dnipro Dnipropetrovsk | | 24.200 |
| (Germany) Hamburger SV | | 24.166 |
| (Serbia and Montenegro) Red Star Belgrade | | 21.012 |
| (England) Everton | | 20.864 |
| (England) Bolton Wanderers | | 20.864 |
| (Italy) Sampdoria | | 20.191 |
| (Italy) Palermo | | 20.191 |
| (Romania) Steaua București | | 20.101 |
| (Denmark) Brøndby | | 19.676 |
| (Belgium) Genk | | 19.476 |
| (Switzerland) Grasshopper | | 18.887 |

| Team | Notes | Coeff. |
|---|---|---|
| (Russia) Zenit Saint Petersburg | | 18.469 |
| (Czech Republic) Teplice | | 18.223 |
| (Bulgaria) Levski Sofia | | 18.118 |
| (France) Strasbourg | | 17.324 |
| (France) Rennes | | 16.324 |
| (Germany) Mainz 05 | | 16.166 |
| (Portugal) Braga | | 15.739 |
| (Greece) Aris | | 15.715 |
| (Denmark) Copenhagen | | 15.676 |
| (Bulgaria) CSKA Sofia | | 15.118 |
| (Portugal) Vitória de Setúbal | | 14.739 |
| (Portugal) Vitória de Guimarães | | 14.739 |
| (Hungary) Debrecen | | 14.390 |
| (Bulgaria) Litex Lovech | | 14.118 |
| (Netherlands) Willem II | | 13.145 |
| (Sweden) Halmstads BK | | 13.076 |
| (Greece) Skoda Xanthi | | 12.715 |
| (Norway) Viking | | 12.665 |
| (Scotland) Hibernian | | 12.476 |
| (Romania) Dinamo București | | 12.101 |

| Team | Notes | Coeff. |
|---|---|---|
| (Poland) Groclin Grodzisk Wielkopolski | | 11.929 |
| (Norway) Vålerenga | | 11.665 |
| (Belgium) Germinal Beerschot | | 10.476 |
| (Czech Republic) Baník Ostrava | | 10.223 |
| (Ukraine) Metalurh Donetsk | | 10.200 |
| (Denmark) Midtjylland | | 8.676 |
| (Russia) Krylia Sovetov Samara | | 8.469 |
| (Romania) Rapid București | | 8.101 |
| (Norway) Brann | | 7.665 |
| (Israel) Maccabi Petah Tikva | | 7.218 |
| (Switzerland) Zürich | | 6.887 |
| (Norway) Tromsø | | 6.665 |
| (Bulgaria) Lokomotiv Plovdiv | | 6.118 |
| (Cyprus) APOEL | | 5.695 |
| (Sweden) Malmö FF | | 5.076 |
| (Cyprus) Anorthosis Famagusta | | 4.695 |
| (Slovenia) Domžale | | 3.190 |
| (Bosnia and Herzegovina) Široki Brijeg | | 2.365 |
| (Finland) MYPA | | 2.158 |
| (Republic of Ireland) Cork City | | 1.375 |

Notes

1. ^{TH} Title holders
2. ^{Q2} Winners from the second qualifying round
3. ^{CL} Losers from the Champions League third qualifying round
4. ^{IC} Teams qualified via the Intertoto Cup

== Seeding ==
The 80 teams were split into eight groups of ten teams; five seeded teams and five unseeded teams.

| Group 1 | | Group 2 | | Group 3 | | Group 4 | |
| Seeded | Unseeded | Seeded | Unseeded | Seeded | Unseeded | Seeded | Unseeded |
|---|---|---|---|---|---|---|---|
| (France) Auxerre; (Greece) PAOK; (Czech Republic) Slavia Prague; (Germany) Hamburger SV; (England) Everton | (Bulgaria) Levski Sofia; (Denmark) Copenhagen; (Romania) Dinamo București; (Ukraine) Metalurh Donetsk; (Republic of Ireland) Cork City | (Germany) Bayer Leverkusen; (France) Marseille; (Russia) CSKA Moscow; (Serbia and Montenegro) Red Star Belgrade; (Switzerland) Grasshopper | (Portugal) Braga; (Bulgaria) CSKA Sofia; (Belgium) Germinal Beerschot; (Denmark) Midtjylland; (Finland) MYPA | (Netherlands) Feyenoord; (Spain) Sevilla; (Switzerland) Basel; (Ukraine) Dnipro Dnipropetrovsk; (Italy) Sampdoria | (Germany) Mainz 05; (Portugal) Vitória de Setúbal; (Scotland) Hibernian; (Romania) Rapid București; (Bosnia and Herzegovina) Široki Brijeg | (Germany) VfB Stuttgart; (Netherlands) AZ; (Poland) Wisła Kraków; (Spain) Osasuna; (Romania) Steaua București | (France) Rennes; (Portugal) Vitória de Guimarães; (Norway) Vålerenga; (Russia) Krylia Sovetov Samara; (Slovenia) Domžale |
| Group 5 | | Group 6 | | Group 7 | | Group 8 | |
| Seeded | Unseeded | Seeded | Unseeded | Seeded | Unseeded | Seeded | Unseeded |
| (Portugal) Sporting CP; (Russia) Lokomotiv Moscow; (England) Middlesbrough; (Austria) GAK; (Italy) Palermo | (France) Strasbourg; (Sweden) Halmstads BK; (Greece) Skoda Xanthi; (Norway) Brann; (Cyprus) Anorthosis Famagusta | (Italy) Roma; (Turkey) Beşiktaş; (Serbia and Montenegro) Partizan; (Netherlands) Heerenveen; (Belgium) Genk | (Greece) Aris; (Bulgaria) Litex Lovech; (Czech Republic) Baník Ostrava; (Israel) Maccabi Petah Tikva; (Sweden) Malmö FF | (France) Monaco; (Germany) Hertha BSC; (Spain) Espanyol; Austria Wien; (Denmark) Brøndby | (Czech Republic) Teplice; (Netherlands) Willem II; (Norway) Viking; (Switzerland) Zürich; (Cyprus) APOEL | (Turkey) Galatasaray; (Greece) AEK Athens; (France) Lens; (Ukraine) Shakhtar Donetsk; (England) Bolton Wanderers | (Russia) Zenit Saint Petersburg; (Hungary) Debrecen; (Poland) Groclin Grodzisk Wielkopolski; (Norway) Tromsø; (Bulgaria) Lokomotiv Plovdiv |

== Summary ==
| Team 1 | Agg. | Team 2 | 1st leg | 2nd leg |
|---|---|---|---|---|
| APOEL (Cyprus) | 1–4 | (Germany) Hertha BSC | 0–1 | 1–3 |
| Auxerre (France) | 2–2 (a) | (Bulgaria) Levski Sofia | 2–1 | 0–1 |
| Baník Ostrava (Czech Republic) | 2–5 | (Netherlands) Heerenveen | 2–0 | 0–5 |
| Basel (Switzerland) | 6–0 | (Bosnia and Herzegovina) Široki Brijeg | 5–0 | 1–0 |
| Bayer Leverkusen (Germany) | 0–2 | (Bulgaria) CSKA Sofia | 0–1 | 0–1 |
| Beşiktaş (Turkey) | 4–2 | (Sweden) Malmö FF | 0–1 | 4–1 |
| Bolton Wanderers (England) | 4–2 | (Bulgaria) Lokomotiv Plovdiv | 2–1 | 2–1 |
| Brøndby (Denmark) | 3–2 | (Switzerland) Zürich | 2–0 | 1–2 |
| Red Star Belgrade (Serbia and Montenegro) | 1–1 (a) | (Portugal) Braga | 0–0 | 1–1 |
| CSKA Moscow (Russia) | 6–2 | (Denmark) Midtjylland | 3–1 | 3–1 |
| Dinamo București (Romania) | 5–2 | (England) Everton | 5–1 | 0–1 |
| Feyenoord (Netherlands) | 1–2 | (Romania) Rapid București | 1–1 | 0–1 |
| Teplice (Czech Republic) | 1–3 | (Spain) Espanyol | 1–1 | 0–2 |
| Germinal Beerschot (Belgium) | 0–0 (1–4 p) | (France) Marseille | 0–0 | 0–0 (a.e.t.) |
| Grasshopper (Switzerland) | 4–1 | (Finland) MYPA | 1–1 | 3–0 |
| GAK (Austria) | 0–7 | (France) Strasbourg | 0–2 | 0–5 |
| Vitória de Guimarães (Portugal) | 4–0 | (Poland) Wisła Kraków | 3–0 | 1–0 |
| Halmstads BK (Sweden) | 4–4 (a) | (Portugal) Sporting CP | 1–2 | 3–2 (a.e.t.) |
| Hamburger SV (Germany) | 2–1 | (Denmark) Copenhagen | 1–1 | 1–0 |
| Hibernian (Scotland) | 1–5 | (Ukraine) Dnipro Dnipropetrovsk | 0–0 | 1–5 |
| Krylia Sovetov Samara (Russia) | 6–6 (a) | (Netherlands) AZ | 5–3 | 1–3 |
| Lens (France) | 5–3 | (Poland) Groclin Grodzisk Wielkopolski | 1–1 | 4–2 |
| Litex Lovech (Bulgaria) | 3–2 | (Belgium) Genk | 2–2 | 1–0 |
| Maccabi Petah Tikva (Israel) | 5–4 | (Serbia and Montenegro) Partizan | 0–2 | 5–2 |
| Middlesbrough (England) | 2–0 | (Greece) Skoda Xanthi | 2–0 | 0–0 |
| Monaco (France) | 5–1 | (Netherlands) Willem II | 2–0 | 3–1 |
| Palermo (Italy) | 6–1 | (Cyprus) Anorthosis Famagusta | 2–1 | 4–0 |
| PAOK (Greece) | 3–3 (a) | (Ukraine) Metalurh Donetsk | 1–1 | 2–2 |
| Rennes (France) | 3–1 | (Spain) Osasuna | 3–1 | 0–0 |
| Roma (Italy) | 5–1 | (Greece) Aris | 5–1 | 0–0 |
| Sevilla (Spain) | 2–0 | (Germany) Mainz 05 | 0–0 | 2–0 |
| Shakhtar Donetsk (Ukraine) | 6–1 | (Hungary) Debrecen | 4–1 | 2–0 |
| Brann (Norway) | 3–5 | (Russia) Lokomotiv Moscow | 1–2 | 2–3 |
| Slavia Prague (Czech Republic) | 4–1 | (Republic of Ireland) Cork City | 2–0 | 2–1 |
| Tromsø (Norway) | 2–1 | (Turkey) Galatasaray | 1–0 | 1–1 |
| Vålerenga (Norway) | 1–6 | (Romania) Steaua București | 0–3 | 1–3 |
| VfB Stuttgart (Germany) | 2–1 | (Slovenia) Domžale | 2–0 | 0–1 |
| Viking (Norway) | 2–2 (a) | Austria Wien | 1–0 | 1–2 |
| Vitória de Setúbal (Portugal) | 1–2 | (Italy) Sampdoria | 1–1 | 0–1 |
| Zenit Saint Petersburg (Russia) | 1–0 | (Greece) AEK Athens | 0–0 | 1–0 |

== Matches ==
15 September 2005
20:00

| APOEL (Cyprus) | 0–1 | (Germany) Hertha BSC |
|---|---|---|
| | Report | Marcelinho 90+2' (pen.) |

GSP Stadium, Nicosia
Attendance: 6,326
Referee: Viktor Kassai (Hungary)
29 September 2005
18:30

| Hertha BSC (Germany) | 3–1 | (Cyprus) APOEL |
|---|---|---|
| Marcelinho 15'; Rafael 25'; Cairo 52' | Report | Makrides 76' |

Olympiastadion, Berlin
Attendance: 22,612
Referee: Nicolai Vollquartz (Denmark)

Hertha BSC won 4–1 on aggregate.

15 September 2005
20:30

| Auxerre (France) | 2–1 | (Bulgaria) Levski Sofia |
|---|---|---|
| Poyet 55'; Pieroni 67' | Report | Bardon 34' |

Stade de l'Abbé-Deschamps, Auxerre
Attendance: 3,401
Referee: Helmut Fleischer (Germany)
29 September 2005
18:30

| Levski Sofia (Bulgaria) | 1–0 | (France) Auxerre |
|---|---|---|
| Koprivarov 28' | Report |

Georgi Asparuhov Stadium, Sofia
Attendance: 15,850
Referee: Martin Ingvarsson (Sweden)

2–2 on aggregate; Levski Sofia won on away goals.

15 September 2005
21:00

| Baník Ostrava (Czech Republic) | 2–0 | (Netherlands) Heerenveen |
|---|---|---|
| Klimpl 28'; Magera 45' (pen.) | Report |

Bazaly, Ostrava
Attendance: 10,337
Referee: Nikolai Ivanov (Russia)
29 September 2005
21:15

| Heerenveen (Netherlands) | 5–0 | (Czech Republic) Baník Ostrava |
|---|---|---|
| Samaras 3'; Nilsson 45'; Huntelaar 60', 67'; Yıldırım 66' | Report |

Abe Lenstra Stadion, Heerenveen
Attendance: 16,500
Referee: Andy D'Urso (England)

Heerenveen won 5–2 on aggregate.

15 September 2005
19:30

| Basel (Switzerland) | 5–0 | (Bosnia and Herzegovina) Široki Brijeg |
|---|---|---|
| Delgado 10', 78', 88'; Ergić 70'; Eduardo 85' | Report |

St. Jakob-Park, Basel
Attendance: 14,448
Referee: Zsolt Szabo (Hungary)
29 September 2005
19:30

| Široki Brijeg (Bosnia and Herzegovina) | 0–1 | (Switzerland) Basel |
|---|---|---|
| | Report | Petrić 8' |

Stadion Pecara, Široki Brijeg
Attendance: 4,500
Referee: Tony Asumaa (Finland)

Basel won 6–0 on aggregate.

15 September 2005
18:15

| Bayer Leverkusen (Germany) | 0–1 | (Bulgaria) CSKA Sofia |
|---|---|---|
| | Report | Todorov 15' |

BayArena, Leverkusen
Attendance: 18,000
Referee: Serge Gumienny (Belgium)
29 September 2005
16:15

| CSKA Sofia (Bulgaria) | 1–0 | (Germany) Bayer Leverkusen |
|---|---|---|
| Hdiouad 67' | Report |

Balgarska Armiya Stadium, Sofia
Attendance: 16,693
Referee: Espen Berntsen (Norway)

CSKA Sofia won 2–0 on aggregate.

15 September 2005
19:00

| Beşiktaş (Turkey) | 0–1 | (Sweden) Malmö FF |
|---|---|---|
| | Report | Alves 70' |

BJK İnönü Stadium, Istanbul
Attendance: 18,931
Referee: Paul Allaerts (Belgium)
29 September 2005
20:30

| Malmö FF (Sweden) | 1–4 | (Turkey) Beşiktaş |
|---|---|---|
| Alves 61' | Report | Youla 28', 53'; Güneş 34'; Metin 90+4' |

Malmö Stadion, Malmö
Attendance: 8,070
Referee: Peter Sippel (Germany)

Beşiktaş won 4–2 on aggregate.

15 September 2005
21:10

| Bolton Wanderers (England) | 2–1 | (Bulgaria) Lokomotiv Plovdiv |
|---|---|---|
| Diouf 72'; Borgetti 90+1' | Report | Jančevski 27' |

Reebok Stadium, Horwich
Attendance: 19,273
Referee: Darko Ceferin (Slovenia)
29 September 2005
16:55

| Lokomotiv Plovdiv (Bulgaria) | 1–2 | (England) Bolton Wanderers |
|---|---|---|
| Iliev 52' | Report | Tunchev 79' (o.g.); Nolan 86' |

Lazur Stadium, Burgas
Attendance: 8,340
Referee: Jouni Hyytiä (Finland)

Bolton Wanderers won 4–2 on aggregate.

15 September 2005
20:15

| Brøndby (Denmark) | 2–0 | (Switzerland) Zürich |
|---|---|---|
| Skoubo 46'; Johansen 72' | Report |

Brøndby Stadium, Brøndbyvester
Attendance: 13,614
Referee: Romans Lajuks (Latvia)
29 September 2005
20:15

| Zürich (Switzerland) | 2–1 | (Denmark) Brøndby |
|---|---|---|
| Raffael 15', 80' | Report | Elmander 42' |

Letzigrund, Zürich
Attendance: 8,600
Referee: Claude Colombo (France)

Brøndby won 3–2 on aggregate.

15 September 2005
20:15

| Red Star Belgrade (Serbia and Montenegro) | 0–0 | (Portugal) Braga |
|---|---|---|
| | Report |

Stadion FK Crvena zvezda, Belgrade
Attendance: 32,786
Referee: Ruud Bossen (Netherlands)
29 September 2005
20:30

| Braga (Portugal) | 1–1 | (Serbia and Montenegro) Red Star Belgrade |
|---|---|---|
| Jaime Júnior 86' | Report | Purović 11' |

Estádio Municipal de Braga, Braga
Attendance: 12,000
Referee: Franz-Xaver Wack (Germany)

1–1 on aggregate; Red Star Belgrade won on away goals.

15 September 2005
17:00

| CSKA Moscow (Russia) | 3–1 | (Denmark) Midtjylland |
|---|---|---|
| Gusev 21'; Carvalho 76', 79' | Report | Pimpong 24' |

Dynamo Stadium, Moscow
Attendance: 150
Referee: Bernhard Brugger (Austria)
29 September 2005
20:00

| Midtjylland (Denmark) | 1–3 | (Russia) CSKA Moscow |
|---|---|---|
| D. Nielsen 14' | Report | Carvalho 61', 77'; Samodin 76' |

MCH Arena, Herning
Attendance: 7,022
Referee: Edo Trivkovic (Croatia)

CSKA Moscow won 6–2 on aggregate.

15 September 2005
20:45

| Dinamo București (Romania) | 5–1 | (England) Everton |
|---|---|---|
| Niculescu 27'; Zicu 51'; Petre 74'; Bratu 76', 90+2' | Report | Yobo 30' |

Stadionul Dinamo, Bucharest
Attendance: 11,100
Referee: Gianluca Paparesta (Italy)
29 September 2005
20:00

| Everton (England) | 1–0 | (Romania) Dinamo București |
|---|---|---|
| Cahill 28' | Report |

Goodison Park, Liverpool
Attendance: 21,843
Referee: Laurent Duhamel (France)

Dinamo București won 5–2 on aggregate.

15 September 2005
19:00

| Feyenoord (Netherlands) | 1–1 | (Romania) Rapid București |
|---|---|---|
| Kuyt 40' | Report | Vasilache 74' (pen.) |

De Kuip, Rotterdam
Attendance: 150
Referee: Vladimír Hriňák (Slovakia)
29 September 2005
18:00

| Rapid București (Romania) | 1–0 | (Netherlands) Feyenoord |
|---|---|---|
| Buga 12' | Report |

Stadionul Giulești-Valentin Stănescu, Bucharest
Attendance: 8,250
Referee: Lucílio Batista (Portugal)

Rapid București won 2–1 on aggregate.

15 September 2005
18:30

| Teplice (Czech Republic) | 1–1 | (Spain) Espanyol |
|---|---|---|
| Jirsák 48' | Report | García 82' |

Na Stínadlech, Teplice
Attendance: 14,620
Referee: Dejan Delević (Serbia and Montenegro)
29 September 2005
21:45

| Espanyol (Spain) | 2–0 | (Czech Republic) Teplice |
|---|---|---|
| Fredson 80'; Jofre 89' | Report |

Estadi Olímpic Lluís Companys, Barcelona
Attendance: 9,134
Referee: Selçuk Dereli (Turkey)

Espanyol won 3–1 on aggregate.

15 September 2005
20:30

| Germinal Beerschot (Belgium) | 0–0 | (France) Marseille |
|---|---|---|
| | Report |

Olympisch Stadion, Antwerp
Attendance: 12,150
Referee: Alberto Undiano Mallenco (Spain)
29 September 2005
21:00

| Marseille (France) | 0–0 (a.e.t.) | (Belgium) Germinal Beerschot |
|---|---|---|
| | Report |
Penalties
| Giménez (penalty scored); André Luís (penalty scored); Taiwo (penalty scored); Nasri (penalty scored) | 4–1 | (penalty missed) Öztürk; (penalty scored) Chimedza; (penalty missed) Agyeman |

Stade Vélodrome, Marseille
Attendance: 22,068
Referee: Michael Weiner (Germany)

0–0 on aggregate; Marseille won 4–1 on penalties.

15 September 2005
19:30

| Grasshopper (Switzerland) | 1–1 | (Finland) MYPA |
|---|---|---|
| Salatić 1' | Report | Marco Manso 19' |

Hardturm, Zürich
Attendance: 3,200
Referee: Dougie McDonald (Scotland)
29 September 2005
18:30

| MYPA (Finland) | 0–3 | (Switzerland) Grasshopper |
|---|---|---|
| | Report | Touré 75'; Salatić 80'; Rogério 86' |

Pohjola Stadion, Vantaa
Attendance: 4,101
Referee: Vitaliy Godulyan (Ukraine)

Grasshopper won 4–1 on aggregate.

15 September 2005
20:45

| GAK (Austria) | 0–2 | (France) Strasbourg |
|---|---|---|
| | Report | Pagis 1'; Lacour 45' |

Arnold Schwarzenegger Stadium, Graz
Attendance: 6,274
Referee: Jaroslav Jára (Czech Republic)
29 September 2005
18:15

| Strasbourg (France) | 5–0 | (Austria) GAK |
|---|---|---|
| Haggui 5'; Farnerud 40', 50'; Le Pen 59'; Abd Rabo 68' | Report |

Stade de la Meinau, Strasbourg
Attendance: 12,184
Referee: Domenico Messina (Italy)

Strasbourg won 7–0 on aggregate.

15 September 2005
21:30

| Vitória de Guimarães (Portugal) | 3–0 | (Poland) Wisła Kraków |
|---|---|---|
| Cléber 24' (pen.); Mário Sérgio 70'; Benachour 72' | Report |

Estádio D. Afonso Henriques, Guimarães
Attendance: 8,300
Referee: Ivan Bebek (Croatia)
29 September 2005
20:30

| Wisła Kraków (Poland) | 0–1 | (Portugal) Vitória de Guimarães |
|---|---|---|
| | Report | Saganowski 82' |

Stadion Miejski in Kraków, Kraków
Attendance: 13,758
Referee: Anton Genov (Bulgaria)

Vitória de Guimarães won 4–0 on aggregate.

15 September 2005
20:45

| Halmstads BK (Sweden) | 1–2 | (Portugal) Sporting CP |
|---|---|---|
| Þorvaldsson 42' (pen.) | Report | Wender 44'; Deivid 47' |

Örjans Vall, Halmstad
Attendance: 3,262
Referee: Tomasz Mikulski (Poland)
29 September 2005
22:15

| Sporting CP (Portugal) | 2–3 (a.e.t.) | (Sweden) Halmstads BK |
|---|---|---|
| Wender 34'; Žvirgždauskas 103' (o.g.) | Report | Þorvaldsson 15'; Žvirgždauskas 89'; Ingelsten 113' |

Estádio José Alvalade, Lisbon
Attendance: 14,490
Referee: Johan Verbist (Belgium)

4–4 on aggregate; Halmstads BK won on away goals.

15 September 2005
20:30

| Hamburger SV (Germany) | 1–1 | (Denmark) Copenhagen |
|---|---|---|
| Van der Vaart 37' | Report | Van Heerden 40' |

Volksparkstadion, Hamburg
Attendance: 43,085
Referee: Eric Braamhaar (Netherlands)
29 September 2005
21:00

| Copenhagen (Denmark) | 0–1 | (Germany) Hamburger SV |
|---|---|---|
| | Report | Van der Vaart 90+1' (pen.) |

Parken Stadium, Copenhagen
Attendance: 34,446
Referee: Matt Messias (England)

Hamburger SV won 2–1 on aggregate.

15 September 2005
20:45

| Hibernian (Scotland) | 0–0 | (Ukraine) Dnipro Dnipropetrovsk |
|---|---|---|
| | Report |

Easter Road, Edinburgh
Attendance: 16,861
Referee: Knud Erik Fisker (Denmark)
29 September 2005
20:00

| Dnipro Dnipropetrovsk (Ukraine) | 5–1 | (Scotland) Hibernian |
|---|---|---|
| Nazarenko 1'; Shershun 26'; Shelayev 39' (pen.); Melaschenko 86', 90+4' | Report | Riordan 25' |

Stadium Meteor, Dnipropetrovsk
Attendance: 17,000
Referee: Fritz Stuchlik (Austria)

Dnipro Dnipropetrovsk won 5–1 on aggregate.

15 September 2005
17:00

| Krylia Sovetov Samara (Russia) | 5–3 | (Netherlands) AZ |
|---|---|---|
| Leilton 11'; Adamu 44'; Kowba 49'; Husin 63'; Bober 90+2' | Report | Vlaar 18'; Perez 56'; Van Galen 85' |

Metallurg Stadium, Samara
Attendance: 25,000
Referee: Athanassios Briakos (Greece)
29 September 2005
20:15

| AZ (Netherlands) | 3–1 | (Russia) Krylia Sovetov Samara |
|---|---|---|
| Van Galen 44'; Koevermans 79'; Landzaat 84' (pen.) | Report | Adamu 15' |

Alkmaarderhout, Alkmaar
Attendance: 8,100
Referee: Kenny Clark (Scotland)

6–6 on aggregate; AZ won on away goals.

15 September 2005
20:00

| Lens (France) | 1–1 | (Poland) Groclin Grodzisk Wielkopolski |
|---|---|---|
| Hilton 13' | Report | Lachor 14' (o.g.) |

Stade Félix-Bollaert, Lens
Attendance: 20,294
Referee: Alan Kelly (Republic of Ireland)
29 September 2005
18:30

| Groclin Grodzisk Wielkopolski (Poland) | 2–4 | (France) Lens |
|---|---|---|
| Sedláček 57' (pen.); Sáblík 78' | Report | Cousin 23', 54'; Dindane 30'; Lachor 90+1' |

Dyskobolia Stadium, Grodzisk Wielkopolski
Attendance: 3,620
Referee: Kristinn Jakobsson (Iceland)

Lens won 5–3 on aggregate.

15 September 2005
19:30

| Litex Lovech (Bulgaria) | 2–2 | (Belgium) Genk |
|---|---|---|
| Venkov 65'; Novaković 90+1' | Report | Daerden 53'; Stojanović 85' |

Lovech Stadium, Lovech
Attendance: 1,800
Referee: Attila Hanacsek (Hungary)
29 September 2005
20:45

| Genk (Belgium) | 0–1 | (Bulgaria) Litex Lovech |
|---|---|---|
| | Report | Sandrinho 56' |

Fenix Stadion, Genk
Attendance: 6,343
Referee: Levan Paniashvili (Georgia)

Litex Lovech won 3–2 on aggregate.

15 September 2005
19:30

| Maccabi Petah Tikva (Israel) | 0–2 | (Serbia and Montenegro) Partizan |
|---|---|---|
| | Report | Vukčević 33'; Radonjić 46' |

Ramat Gan Stadium, Ramat Gan (Note: Maccabi Petah Tikva played their home matches at Ramat Gan Stadium in Tel Aviv District instead of their regular stadium, Municipal Stadium, Petah Tikva.)
Attendance: 3,700
Referee: Costas Kapitanis (Cyprus)
29 September 2005
19:15

| Partizan (Serbia and Montenegro) | 2–5 | (Israel) Maccabi Petah Tikva |
|---|---|---|
| Radonjić 13' (pen.), 41' | Report | Mashiah 4' (pen.); Golan 21', 44', 48'; Edri 88' |

Stadion FK Partizan, Belgrade
Attendance: 8,500
Referee: Carlos Megia Davila (Spain)

Maccabi Petah Tikva won 5–4 on aggregate.

15 September 2005
21:00

| Middlesbrough (England) | 2–0 | (Greece) Skoda Xanthi |
|---|---|---|
| Boateng 28'; Viduka 83' | Report |

Riverside Stadium, Middlesbrough
Attendance: 14,190
Referee: Stefan Messner (Austria)
29 September 2005
20:00

| Skoda Xanthi (Greece) | 0–0 | (England) Middlesbrough |
|---|---|---|
| | Report |

Skoda Xanthi Arena, Xanthi
Attendance: 5,013
Referee: Knut Kircher (Germany)

Middlesbrough won 2–0 on aggregate.

15 September 2005
21:00

| Monaco (France) | 2–0 | (Netherlands) Willem II |
|---|---|---|
| Kapo 24'; Adebayor 47' | Report |

Stade Louis II, Monaco
Attendance: 9,118
Referee: Alexandru Tudor (Romania)
29 September 2005
18:00

| Willem II (Netherlands) | 1–3 | (France) Monaco |
|---|---|---|
| Hadouir 84' | Report | Maicon 47'; Adebayor 54'; Chevantón 89' |

Koning Willem II Stadion, Tilburg
Attendance: 11,600
Referee: Eduardo Iturralde González (Spain)

Monaco won 5–1 on aggregate.

15 September 2005
21:00

| Palermo (Italy) | 2–1 | (Cyprus) Anorthosis Famagusta |
|---|---|---|
| Corini 5'; Brienza 30' (pen.) | Report | Ketsbaia 76' |

Stadio Renzo Barbera, Palermo
Attendance: 13,050
Referee: Paulo Costa (Portugal)
29 September 2005
17:00

| Anorthosis Famagusta (Cyprus) | 0–4 | (Italy) Palermo |
|---|---|---|
| | Report | Caracciolo 5'; Makinwa 46', 69'; Santana 53' |

GSP Stadium, Nicosia
Attendance: 8,122
Referee: Mark Halsey (England)

Palermo won 6–1 on aggregate.

15 September 2005
19:30

| PAOK (Greece) | 1–1 | (Ukraine) Metalurh Donetsk |
|---|---|---|
| Salpingidis 25' | Report | Shyshchenko 66' |

Toumba Stadium, Thessaloniki
Attendance: 7,963
Referee: Julián Rodríguez Santiago (Spain)
29 September 2005
18:00

| Metalurh Donetsk (Ukraine) | 2–2 | (Greece) PAOK |
|---|---|---|
| Kosyrin 39'; Shyshchenko 57' | Report | Salpingidis 42'; Konstantinidis 45+1' |

Shakhtar Stadium, Donetsk
Attendance: 16,000
Referee: Pieter Vink (Netherlands)

3–3 on aggregate; PAOK won on away goals.

15 September 2005
19:00

| Rennes (France) | 3–1 | (Spain) Osasuna |
|---|---|---|
| Frei 27', 74'; Hadji 84' | Report | Milošević 52' |

Stade de la Route de Lorient, Rennes
Attendance: 19,286
Referee: Cristian Balaj (Romania)
29 September 2005
20:30

| Osasuna (Spain) | 0–0 | (France) Rennes |
|---|---|---|
| | Report |

Estadio Reyno de Navarra, Pamplona
Attendance: 17,227
Referee: Georgios Kasnaferis (Greece)

Rennes won 3–1 on aggregate.

15 September 2005
21:00

| Roma (Italy) | 5–1 | (Greece) Aris |
|---|---|---|
| Aquilani 1'; Panucci 22', 43'; Montella 27'; Totti 53' | Report | Sanjurjo 39' |

Stadio Olimpico, Rome
Attendance: 11,620
Referee: Pedro Proença (Portugal)
29 September 2005
21:00

| Aris (Greece) | 0–0 | (Italy) Roma |
|---|---|---|
| | Report |

Kleanthis Vikelidis Stadium, Thessaloniki
Attendance: 6,350
Referee: Alon Yefet (Israel)

Roma won 5–1 on aggregate.

15 September 2005
21:30

| Sevilla (Spain) | 0–0 | (Germany) Mainz 05 |
|---|---|---|
| | Report |

Ramón Sánchez Pizjuán Stadium, Seville
Attendance: 34,160
Referee: Rob Styles (England)
29 September 2005
20:30

| Mainz 05 (Germany) | 0–2 | (Spain) Sevilla |
|---|---|---|
| | Report | Kanouté 9', 40' |

Commerzbank-Arena, Frankfurt
Attendance: 33,400
Referee: Matteo Trefoloni (Italy)

Sevilla won 2–0 on aggregate.

15 September 2005
18:00

| Shakhtar Donetsk (Ukraine) | 4–1 | (Hungary) Debrecen |
|---|---|---|
| Elano 1'; Brandão 36', 45' (pen.); Vorobey 72' | Report | Sidibe 88' |

RSC Olimpiyskiy, Donetsk
Attendance: 24,106
Referee: Joeri Van De Velde (Belgium)
29 September 2005
20:00

| Debrecen (Hungary) | 0–2 | (Ukraine) Shakhtar Donetsk |
|---|---|---|
| | Report | Brandão 18'; Elano 24' |

Stadion Oláh Gábor Út, Debrecen
Attendance: 6,500
Referee: Jonas Eriksson (Sweden)

Shakhtar Donetsk won 6–1 on aggregate.

15 September 2005
19:00

| Brann (Norway) | 1–2 | (Russia) Lokomotiv Moscow |
|---|---|---|
| Winters 45' | Report | Ruopolo 71'; Lebedenko 77' |

Brann Stadion, Bergen
Attendance: 5,113
Referee: Dick van Egmond (Netherlands)
29 September 2005
18:00

| Lokomotiv Moscow (Russia) | 3–2 | (Norway) Brann |
|---|---|---|
| Loskov 61'; Asatiani 77'; Bilyaletdinov 90+1' | Report | Macallister 47'; Miller 74' |

Lokomotiv Stadium, Moscow
Attendance: 13,223
Referee: Markus Nobs (Switzerland)

Lokomotiv Moscow won 5–3 on aggregate.

15 September 2005
20:00

| Slavia Prague (Czech Republic) | 2–0 | (Republic of Ireland) Cork City |
|---|---|---|
| Hrdlička 62'; Piták 79' | Report |

Stadion Evžena Rošického, Prague
Attendance: 4,694
Referee: Željko Širić (Croatia)
29 September 2005
19:30

| Cork City (Republic of Ireland) | 1–2 | (Czech Republic) Slavia Prague |
|---|---|---|
| O'Callaghan 73' (pen.) | Report | Piták 28'; Vlček 59' |

Turners Cross, Cork
Attendance: 5,648
Referee: Philippe Leuba (Switzerland)

Slavia Prague won 4–1 on aggregate.

15 September 2005
20:30

| Tromsø (Norway) | 1–0 | (Turkey) Galatasaray |
|---|---|---|
| Szekeres 77' | Report |

Alfheim Stadion, Tromsø
Attendance: 4,764
Referee: Gerald Lehner (Austria)
29 September 2005
18:45

| Galatasaray (Turkey) | 1–1 | (Norway) Tromsø |
|---|---|---|
| Şükür 79' | Report | Ademolu 32' |

Ali Sami Yen Stadium, Istanbul
Attendance: 21,751
Referee: Antonio Costa (Portugal)

Tromsø won 2–1 on aggregate.

15 September 2005
19:30

| Vålerenga (Norway) | 0–3 | (Romania) Steaua București |
|---|---|---|
| | Report | Rădoi 24'; Iacob 35'; Goian 74' |

Ullevaal Stadion, Oslo
Attendance: 4,192
Referee: Ceri Richards (Wales)
29 September 2005
19:00

| Steaua București (Romania) | 3–1 | (Norway) Vålerenga |
|---|---|---|
| Dică 30'; Boștină 41'; Iacob 48' | Report | Hulsker 55' |

Stadionul Farul, Constanța
Attendance: 8,114
Referee: João Ferreira (Portugal)

Steaua București won 6–1 on aggregate.

15 September 2005
16:30

| VfB Stuttgart (Germany) | 2–0 | (Slovenia) Domžale |
|---|---|---|
| Tomasson 6'; Gentner 88' | Report |

Gottlieb-Daimler-Stadion, Stuttgart
Attendance: 10,000
Referee: Paolo Bertini (Italy)
29 September 2005
14:15

| Domžale (Slovenia) | 1–0 | (Germany) VfB Stuttgart |
|---|---|---|
| Stevanović 16' | Report |

Sports Park, Domžale
Attendance: 2,700
Referee: Jacek Granat (Poland)

VfB Stuttgart won 2–1 on aggregate.

15 September 2005
18:45

| Viking (Norway) | 1–0 | Austria Wien |
|---|---|---|
| Mumba 71' | Report |

Viking Stadion, Stavanger
Attendance: 4,716
Referee: Sergey Shebek (Ukraine)
29 September 2005
20:45

| Austria Wien | 2–1 | (Norway) Viking |
|---|---|---|
| Rushfeldt 21'; Lasnik 47' | Report | Nygaard 12' |

Franz Horr Stadium, Vienna
Attendance: 5,600
Referee: Emil Bozinovski (Macedonia)

2–2 on aggregate; Viking won on away goals.

15 September 2005
18:00

| Vitória de Setúbal (Portugal) | 1–1 | (Italy) Sampdoria |
|---|---|---|
| Hempel 46' | Report | Flachi 14' |

Estádio do Bonfim, Setúbal
Attendance: 4,152
Referee: Hervé Piccirillo (France)
29 September 2005
20:45

| Sampdoria (Italy) | 1–0 | (Portugal) Vitória de Setúbal |
|---|---|---|
| Gasbarroni 7' | Report |

Stadio Luigi Ferraris, Genoa
Attendance: 18,600
Referee: Howard Webb (England)

Sampdoria won 2–1 on aggregate.

15 September 2005
17:00

| Zenit Saint Petersburg (Russia) | 0–0 | (Greece) AEK Athens |
|---|---|---|
| | Report |

Petrovsky Stadium, Saint Petersburg
Attendance: 20,800
Referee: Tommy Skjerven (Norway)
29 September 2005
20:45

| AEK Athens (Greece) | 0–1 | (Russia) Zenit Saint Petersburg |
|---|---|---|
| | Report | Arshavin 89' |

Olympic Stadium, Athens
Attendance: 23,121
Referee: Florian Meyer (Germany)

Zenit Saint Petersburg won 1–0 on aggregate.
