= Grodziskie =

Style of beer from Poland

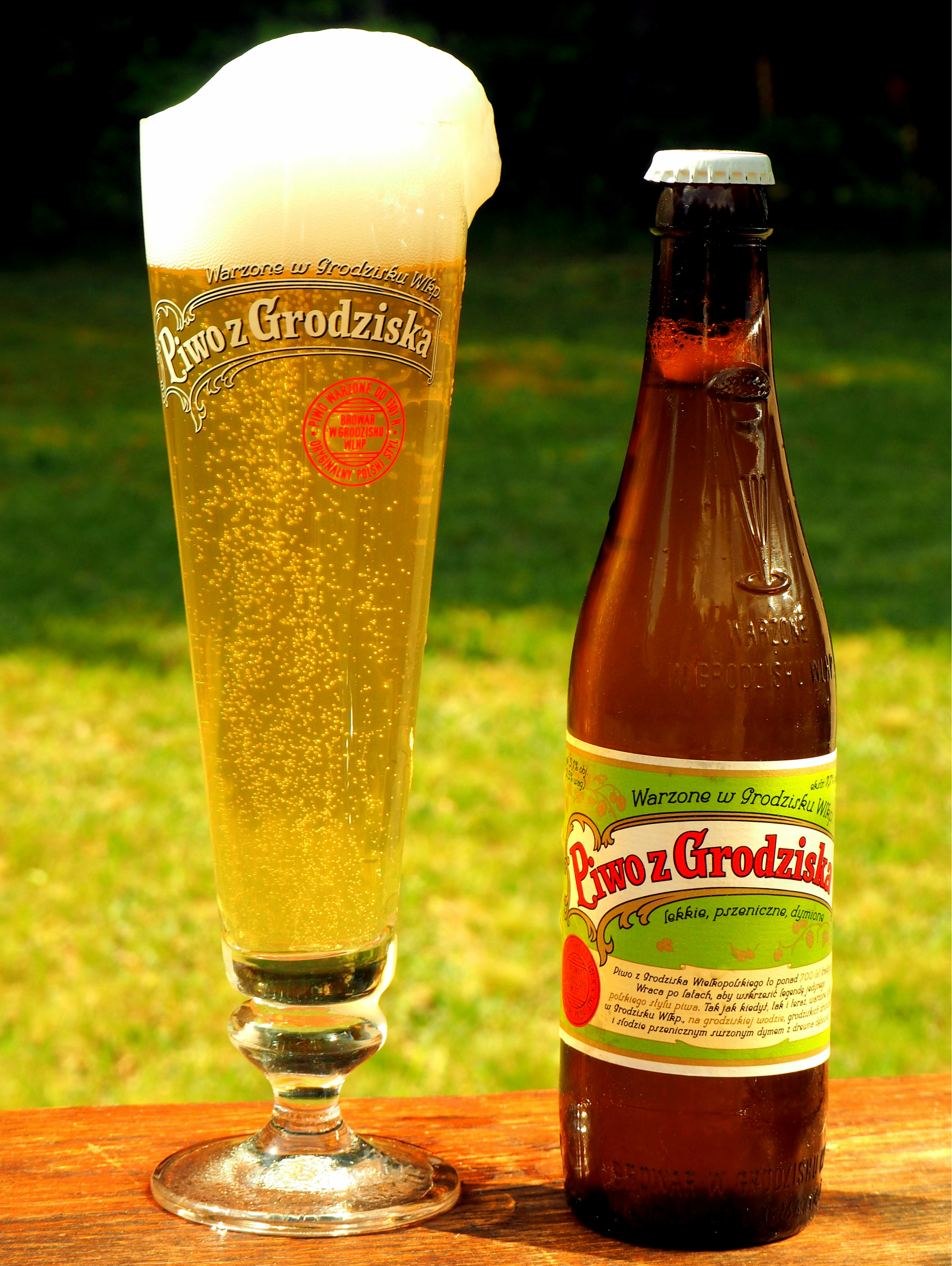
- Piwo z Grodziska, a modern Polish recreation of Grodziskie, brewed in Grodzisk Wielkopolski, served in a tall conical glass designed for this style of beer
- Country of origin: Poland
- Yeast type: Top-fermenting
- Alcohol by volume: 2.5% – 5%

Grodziskie (Polish pronunciation: [ɡrɔˈd͡ʑiskʲɛ]; Other names: Grätzer, Grodzisz) is a historical beer style from Poland made from oak-smoked wheat malt with a clear, light golden color, high carbonation, low alcohol content, low to moderate levels of hop bitterness, and a strong smoke flavor and aroma. The taste is light and crisp, with primary flavors coming from the smoked malt, the high mineral content of the water, and the strain of yeast used to ferment it. It was nicknamed "Polish Champagne" because of its high carbonation levels and valued as a high-quality beer for special occasions.

Grodziskie is brewed from wheat malt that has been dried by circulating oak smoke through the grains. The smokiness of the grain and the mineral profile of the water used to brew the beverage gives the style its characteristic flavor. Polish breweries historically used locally grown hops and one or two strains of brewer's yeast in its production. Before packaging, the beer is treated with isinglass to produce a bright, clear appearance. The beer is packaged before all of the fermentable sugars have been converted to alcohol by the yeast, earlier in the process than is typical in beers. Fermentation continues after packaging, and the carbon dioxide that is produced remains dissolved in the beer, resulting in a very high level of carbonation in the final product.

The beer was originally produced by brewers in the town of Grodzisk Wielkopolski in the 14th or 15th century. Strict regulations regarding the quality of the beer were established by the local brewers' guild, and helped it develop a good reputation in the surrounding cities and neighboring countries. At the peak of its fame, it was exported to 37 countries and was regarded as an exceptionally good beer. The brewing industry in the town flourished. After the Second World War, beer production was nationalized, and the beer entered a period of decline under the Communist government of Poland. By 1993, the last brewery that was producing the style was shut down. After a period of years when the style was not available from any commercial brewers, several breweries began producing seasonal or year-round recreations of the historic style, spurred by interest in the style from the homebrewing community around the world.

== Description ==
Grodziskie is a highly carbonated, low-alcohol beer with a clear, pale yellow to golden color, low to moderate levels of hop bitterness, and a moderate to medium-high smoky aroma and flavor. The bright, clear, and highly carbonated appearance of Grodziskie has caused the beer to be compared with Champagne, and it is sometimes referred to as "Polish Champagne". Most beers that are made from wheat appear cloudy, because the final product contains suspended yeast and proteins from the wheat. During the production of Grodziskie, however, the beer is filtered before it is bottled, usually by adding isinglass. The filtration removes the suspended yeast and proteins, leaving a bright, clear beer. When poured into a glass, it produces a large, long-lasting, tight head with small bubbles. It was traditionally served in tall, conical glasses that were designed to show off the clear, golden color, as well allow a wide, thick layer of foam to form when it was poured.

The taste is light and crisp, with some bite from the carbonation. Brewing and tasting notes from a 1914 publication described Grodziskie as a "rough, bitter beer ... with an intense smoke and hop flavor", but by the late 20th century, the style's flavor had likely evolved to include less hop flavor and bitterness. Modern recreations of this style tend to focus on smoky flavor resulting from the oak-smoked malt, described as "somewhat acrid to semi-sweet", but literature from the 1960s states that a significant proportion of the beer's unique flavors are produced by its malting and brewing process and special strains of brewer's yeast that were used in its production. The flavor may also contain a mild wheat graininess noticeable in the background.

Historically, Grodziskie was made with alcohol levels of around 3.1% abv, but commercial versions were also made with alcohol levels ranging from 2.5% to 5% abv.

== Ingredients ==
The grain used in Grodziskie is malted wheat. During the malting process, the wheat is dried in kilns that are heated by oak-burning furnaces. Instead of using the furnaces to heat clean air which is then used to dry the wheat, the hot smoke from the kilns is forced directly through the grain bed. The smoke dries the grain, and imparts a light color and an intense, pleasant, smoky flavor. This process would not be possible in the type of kilns that were more common in the past, that burned coal or coke as fuel because the soot in the smoke would cause the grain to become discolored and contribute undesirable harsh flavors. The exact degree of smokiness that resulted from the oak kilning in historical times is not known. The smoke from the malting process also adds chemical components to the finished product that help preserve it, giving it a long shelf life despite its low alcohol content. One story is told of a box of Grodziskie being found in the 1950s, buried in the sands of North Africa, that was left behind by German soldiers during World War II. The beer was opened and found to be as fresh as the day it was made. In addition to wheat, there were periods when the beer also included malted barley in various proportions, but for most of its history, it was made entirely from wheat.

Many of the flavor characteristics of Grodziskie result from the chemical makeup of the water that the breweries used to produce the beer. The water from one of the wells on Poznańska Street in Grodzisk was tested, and showed a sulfate ion concentration of 183 parts per million (ppm) and a chloride ion concentration of 81 ppm. Alkalinity (as calcium bicarbonate) was 350 ppm and the magnesium ion concentration was 34 ppm. Using this type of water to produce beer would result in a higher than expected hop flavor because of the high alkalinity and the ratio of sulfate ions to chloride ions. During the early stages of production, this water would have a higher pH, which would inhibit the efficiency of the natural enzymes that convert the starch in the grain to fermentable sugars during mashing. The result is a beer with more unfermented sugars and lower average alcohol content. Finally, the water would have contributed a slightly sour or bitter flavor to the beer, due to the high concentration of magnesium ions.

Two unique strains of yeast were traditionally used; one highly flocculent strain that was responsible for most of the fermentation in the first few days, and the other, a powdery and less flocculant strain, that was slower and finished off the beer in the fermentation vats and in the bottles. Until the end of the 19th century, the breweries that produced Grodziskie used a single strain of yeast that was characterized by low attenuation and early flocculation. However, that strain was lost in the early 20th century. After World War II, yeast was imported from the Groterjan Brewery in Berlin. That yeast was not well suited for producing Grodziskie and was frequently contaminated with spoilage organisms including Lactobacillus. In the 1960s, the state-owned brewery was able to isolate and maintain suitable strains of yeast that produced the desired characteristics, but only the highly-flocculant strain has been preserved to this day. Without access to the actual yeast used historically, most modern recreations of Grodziskie typically use ale yeasts that do not contribute a significant amount of yeast character to the beer.

Brewers typically used locally produced varieties of Polish hops such as Nowotomyski, but would occasionally substitute similar noble hops. Historical sources indicate that around the end of the 19th century, breweries used 3 kilograms (6.6 lb) of hops for every 100 kilograms (220 lb) of wheat malt, but by the 1960s the hopping rate had decreased to 2.4 kilograms (5.3 lb) of hops per 100 kilograms (220 lb) of wheat malt.

== Production ==
The beer was variously produced using an infusion mash or a decoction mash. Some of the traditional production methods of the style are known from undated records from the Grodzisk brewery. These records describe an infusion mash that included a 30-minute acid rest at 38 °C (100 °F), a 30 to 60 minute protease rest at 52 °C (126 °F), an α-amylase rest for 30 minutes at 70 °C (158 °F), and a mash out at 75 °C (167 °F). The wort was boiled for 90 to 120 minutes. Approximately 80% of the hops were added after 15 minutes and the remaining 20% were added 30 minutes before the end of the boil.

After the boil, the wort was cooled and fermented in open wooden vats at 14–16 °C (57–61 °F). The two strains of yeast were added at the same time, and fermentation would proceed rapidly. After one day of fermentation, the thick foam that formed on the top of the fermentation vat was skimmed off and discarded. After 60 hours, up to 50% of the available sugars would have been fermented by the yeast, and thick clumps of yeast were skimmed off of the surface and harvested for reuse. The beer was then pumped with sterile air into clarification tanks. Isinglass was added to clarify the beverage, and then it was bottled.

After packaging, the bottles were stored from three to five weeks at 14–18 °C (57–64 °F) in a dark room as the yeast continued to ferment the remaining sugars in the beer. The carbon dioxide that resulted from the fermentation remained trapped in the bottles and dissolved into the liquid, resulting in high levels of carbonation. During this period, an average of four to five percent of the bottles would burst due to carbonation levels exceeding the strength of the bottles.

== History ==
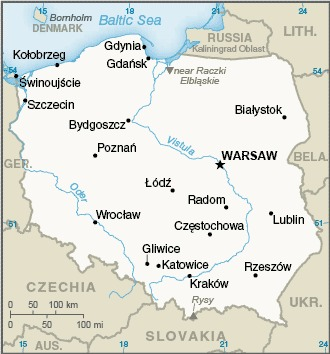
Location of Grodzisk Wielkopolski within the current borders of Poland

The first documented mention of the town of Grodzisk Wielkopolski was from around 1257 as part of lands owned by the Cistercian monastery in Paradyż. The town grew in prominence due to its location on the road between Poznań and Gubin, a road that continued onward to Saxony. By the 16th century, the Ostroróg family in Greater Poland (Wielkopolska) controlled the town. The Ostroróg family was a source of support for the Protestant Reformation in the area, and the town became a center of Protestantism in the country and attracted dissidents from the Czech lands and Western Europe. Craftsmen, scholars, and writers gravitated to the area, which became a center of reformist thought in Wielkopolska. Industrial-scale brewing developed when Johann Volanus, the administrator of the Ostroróg estate and father of Andreas Volanus, a famous Reformation writer, imported skilled brewers from Moravia and Bohemia.

A legend associated with the history of this beer relates to a Benedictine monk named Bernard of Wąbrzeźno. Around 1603, he arrived from the Benedictine monastery in Lubiń to find the residents starving and the town's wells depleted. The brewery was the primary source of income for the city and the hospital. Bernard prayed for the wells and a new source of water suddenly filled the Old Market well. Legends claimed that the newly refilled well had the ability to make whoever drank from it healthy again, and the beer that was produced from the water was far superior to any of the beer the brewers had been able to produce before. The well became a municipal treasure and was given credit for the commercial success of the breweries over the centuries to follow. For over 200 years after the event, the residents of Grodzisk would make an annual procession to Bernard's monastery to bring a keg of the beer that they made from the well as a token of gratitude.

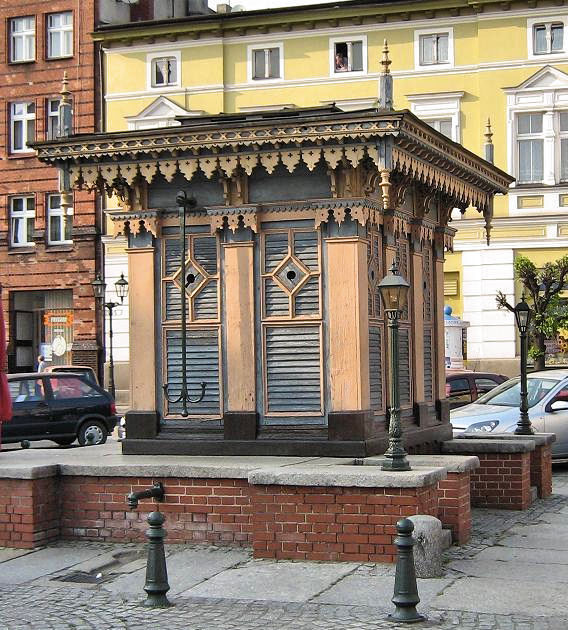
The well in Grodzisk Wielkopolski's Old Market square, traditionally associated with Bernard of Wąbrzeźno

A maltsters' and brewers' guild existed in the town in 1601. The guild created a monopoly on the right to produce malted grain and beer for sale, and kept it in the hands of a select few families, strictly controlled by the guilds. It also implemented rules and regulations on the production of the beer that was designed to protect the quality and reputation of the beer. A system of quality control was put in place; each barrel of beer that was produced was subjected to a beer tasting by the mayor of the town and a council of elders who evaluated its quality and strength and approved the beer for sale or export with a distinctive stamp. Brewers who attempted to cheat the system of quality control were permanently stripped of their right to produce the beer. The guild also organized the production of beer by the major breweries, which shared the Old Market well. In 1843 and 1844, there were two breweries in Grodzisk that shared the well. By 1866, the city had begun taxing the breweries for their use of the municipal wells. Two private breweries built their own wells, and found that the water was just as good as the water from the Old Market. Following this discovery, all of the breweries eventually built their own wells.

The earliest documentation of the beer being exported to other regions is from records in the nearby town of Wschowa from 1671. Rules established by the local hatters' guild established that the penalty for charging less than 12 groschen for dying a hat was a barrel of Grodziskie. In 1694, the nearby city of Poznań listed a bill for expenses that included entries for "Grodzisk beer" at the rate of 15 guilders per barrel that had been purchased as gifts for important people. At that cost, it can be seen that the product was valued as a premium beverage, since local beer produced in Poznań at the time cost only five to six guilders per barrel. Other records from Poznań in 1712 show that the two mayors of the city were receiving Grodziskie beer as a portion of their compensation for their service. By the 18th century, the beverage's reputation had spread throughout Poland, and it became one of the most expensive beers in the country.

Between 1793, when Grodzisk became part of Prussia as a result of the Second Partition of Poland, and 1918, when it became part of a newly independent Poland, the town was renamed Grätz, and the style became known as Grätzer. Records show that annual production of the beer in Grätz was about 3,200 barrels (5,000 hectoliters, 4,300 U.S. bbl), of which 1,111 barrels were transported to Poznań, 1,581 barrels to other nearby towns, including Wschowa, Kościan, Leszno, Rawicz, Bojanowo, Kalisz, and Śmigiel, and 500 barrels were sold within Grätz. In the late 19th century, the beer was being exported into neighboring provinces and other parts of Germany. German immigrants moved to Grätz and built modern breweries, breaking the monopoly that had been held by the brewer's guild. By the 1890s, the five breweries in Grätz produced over 100,000 hectoliters (85,000 U.S. bbl) of beer, with Grätzer produced in the largest quantities. It was exported to other parts of Europe and the world and gained fame as a highly valued beverage. Its peak of popularity occurred just prior to the second World War, when it was being exported to 37 countries.

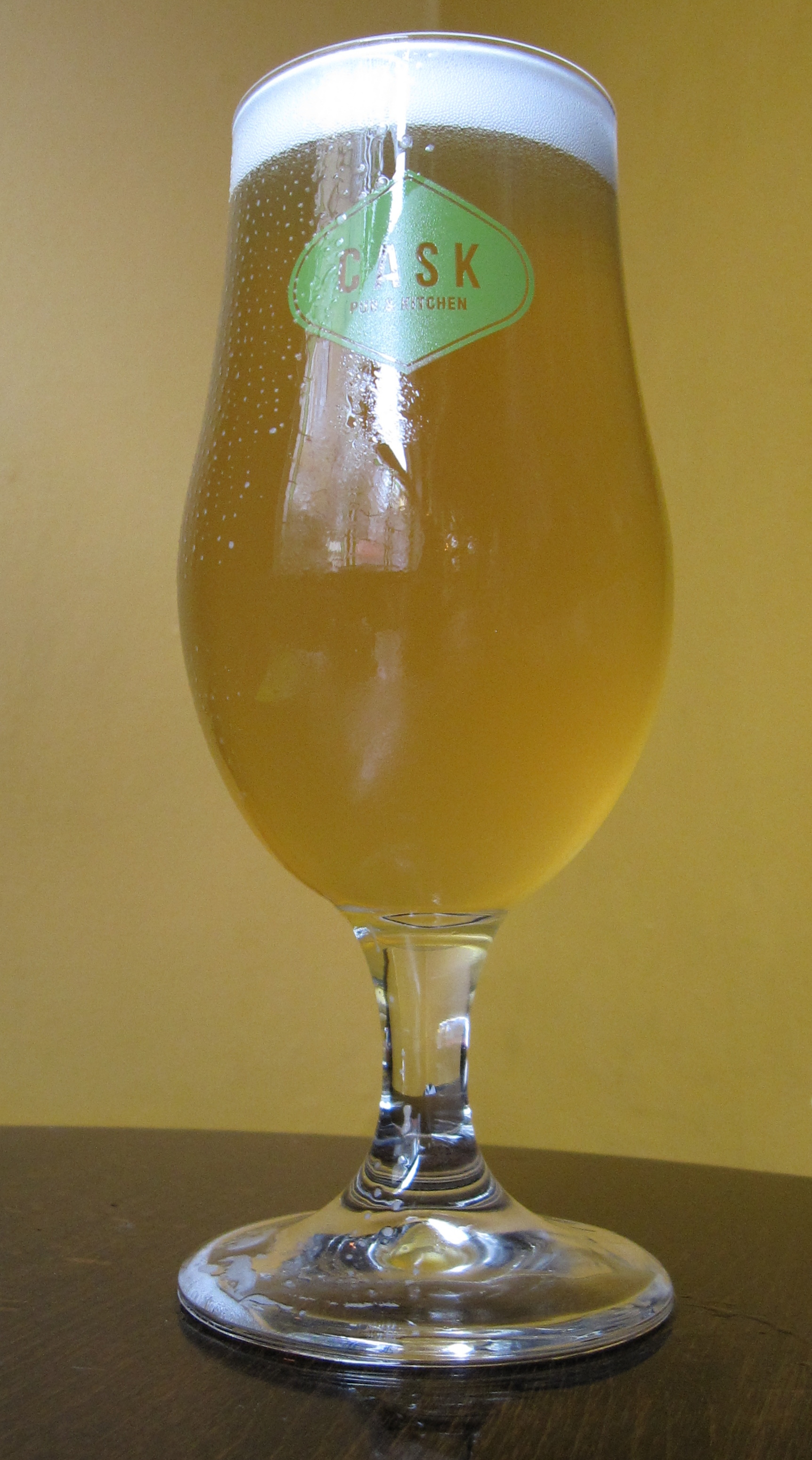
A modern, U.S.-brewed recreation of Grätzer

Starting in 1922, the production of Grodziskie was continued by only one company, Zjednoczone Browary Grodziskie (United Grodzisk Breweries). Between 1929 and 1993, this style had a regionally protected designation put in place by the cabinet of Poland. Production continued under the German occupation of Poland during World War II, and the beer was distributed to German forces fighting in the war. After the Second World War, the breweries were nationalized, and the beer began a period of decline. The communist government in Poland emphasized the large-scale production of basic products like bread, milk, and sugar, and local culinary traditions were neglected. In part, this was due to restrictions on individual businesses and the inability of brewers to profit from the production of small-scale, high-quality foods, and their inability to advertise local goods and specialties. In the early 1980s, different variations of the style were created with different colors and alcohol strengths. After the Communist period in Poland ended in 1989, production continued under the private ownership of Lech Browary Wielkopolski, but ended in 1993, when the brewery was closed due to lack of profitability, and because of the difficulty in finding workers who had experience producing the style. Commercial production of this style ceased for several years, but since 2010, some breweries have produced seasonal or limited production runs of the style.

After the close of the brewery, Grodziskie continued to be brewed by some homebrewers in Poland using 100% smoked wheat. In 2011, the Polish Homebrewers Association formed a commission for the revival of the Grodziskie beer. Even though the style has taken different forms over the years, the purpose of the commission was to develop guidelines that describe a mild version that former brewery workers could identify, even though some brewers and homebrewers have experimented with variations that include different amounts of alcohol and bitterness. Grodziskie was defined in the Brewers Association style guidelines in 2013, and added as a Historical Style to the Beer Judge Certification Program style guidelines in 2015.
