= Radim Sáblík =

Czech footballer (born 1974)

Personal information
- Date of birth: 5 September 1974 (age 52)
- Place of birth: Czechoslovakia
- Height: 1.84 m (6 ft 0 in)
- Position: Defender

Youth career
- Baník Ostrava

Senior career*
Years	Team	Apps	(Gls)
- VTJ Hranice
1995	VP Frýdek-Místek		
1995–1996	NH Ostrava		
1996–1997	Baník Ostrava	21	(1)
1997–1999	VP Frýdek-Místek	38	(1)
1999–2000	NH Ostrava	12	(1)
2000–2001	FC Karviná	14	(0)
2002–2003	Odra Wodzisław	44	(3)
2003–2006	Dyskobolia	36	(3)
2005	→ Obra Kościan (loan)		
2006–2009	Hlučín		
2009	Fotbal Fulnek		
2010–2011	Havířov		
2012	Vítkovice		
- * Club domestic league appearances and goals

Radim Sáblík (born 5 September 1974) is a Czech former professional footballer who played as a defender.

== Club career ==
In his career, he has played for clubs in Czech Republic and Poland, including Baník Ostrava, VP Frýdek-Místek, FC Karviná, Odra Wodzisław and Dyskobolia Grodzisk Wielkopolski.
