= Jonathan Alexandersohn =

Jonathan Alexandersohn (Hungarian: Alexandersohn Jonathán; born about the beginning of the 19th century, Grätz in Posen (Polish: Grodzisk (Wielkopolski)), then Germany - November 24, 1869, Altofen, Kingdom of Hungary, Austro-Hungarian Empire) was a German-Hungarian rabbi.

About 1830 he was rabbi in Schwerin-on-the-Warthe, whence he removed to Hungary. Here Götz Kohn, rabbi of Baja and a native of Schwerin, recommended him to the congregation of Csaba, in the county of Borsod, which elected him rabbi in 1833. His violent temper soon made him many enemies. He pronounced a decree of divorce which brought upon him the enmity of the rabbi of Szántó, Eleazar Löw (Hungarian: Löw Eleázár), whose contention was that no divorce had ever been pronounced in Csaba, because of the uncertainty of the Hebrew transliteration of the name, and therefore it was not lawful to grant a divorce in this place. Alexandersohn's enemies were encouraged by this contention to bring charges against him, and prevailed upon Löw to try him for heresy and for violations of the dietary and ritual laws. He was accused of disbelieving in a hereafter; of saying that he would take a lenient view in all legal questions; of sleeping bareheaded; of walking four cubits from his bed without washing his hands; and of other violations of Jewish rites. In 1835 a court, composed of three rabbis, declared him unworthy of the rabbinical office.

Moses Sofer, chief rabbi of Pozsony (Pressburg), and Moses Teitelbaum, rabbi of Újhely, the leader of the Hasidim in Hungary, confirmed this decision. Alexandersohn appealed to the civil courts in vain; but Solomon Rosenthal, a prominent member of the congregation in Budapest, and his old friend Götz Kohn of Schwerin, took up his case, and appointed a committee of five rabbis to consider it. The committee cleared him of all charges, and ordered the congregation to pay him 800 florins in damages. Alexandersohn would not accept this indemnity, but demanded to be reinstated in his office. He brought other lawsuits against the congregation, and traveled through Germany, Belgium, France, England, and Italy in order to interest other rabbis and laymen in his behalf. Among those who defended him was Zecharias Frankel, then rabbi of Dresden, who addressed a letter to Moses Sofer, urging the latter to rescind his decision. All these efforts were unsuccessful, and in 1846 Alexandersohn published, in German and Hebrew, the documents relating to his case. He was finally reduced to beggary and thrown on public charity for his support, living the life of a tramp.

He died in the Jewish hospital of Altofen on November 24, 1869.
