= Lumír Sedláček =

Czech footballer (born 1978)

Personal information
- Date of birth: 13 June 1978 (age 48)
- Place of birth: Chlebičov, Czechoslovakia
- Height: 1.73 m (5 ft 8 in)
- Positions: Defender; midfielder

Senior career*
Years	Team	Apps	(Gls)
1995–2000	SFC Opava	84	(9)
2000–2002	Slavia Prague	33	(5)
2002	Hradec Králové	10	(0)
2002–2003	České Budějovice	28	(6)
2003–2004	Dyskobolia Groclin	21	(1)
2004–2005	Slavia Prague	25	(1)
2005	Dyskobolia Groclin	13	(1)
2006–2007	Wisła Płock	36	(2)
2007–2008	Polonia Warsaw	31	(5)
2008–2010	Piast Gliwice	26	(0)
2010–2014	SFC Opava	81	(10)
2014–2016	Viktorie Chlebičov		

International career
1998–2000	Czech Republic U21	9	(0)
- * Club domestic league appearances and goals

Lumír Sedláček (born 13 June 1978) is a Czech former professional footballer who played as a defender or midfielder. He has played for the Czech Republic national under-21 football team.

== Honours ==
Wisła Płock

- Polish Cup: 2005–06
- Polish Super Cup: 2006
