= Tomyski hops =

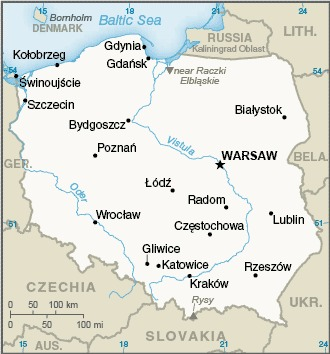
Location of Nowy Tomyśl in modern Poland

Tomyski or Nowotomyski (German: Neutomischel) is a variety of hops that is grown in Poland. It was named for the town of Nowy Tomyśl in western Poland, where it was originally cultivated. It is used as an aroma hop, and contains approximately 2.5% to 4% alpha acids and an average amount of hop resins.

== Acid and Oil Breakdown ==
Property	Tomyski hops
Yield (Kg/Ha)	1600
Alpha acids (%)	2.5 - 4
Beta acids (%)	4 – 7
Cohumulone (% of alpha acids):	26
Total Oils (Mls. per 100 grams dried hops)	0.8 - 1.2
Myrcene (as % of total oils)	15
Humulene (as % of total oils)	45
Farnesene (as % of total oils)	0

== History ==
Although hop cultivation in the area of Nowy Tomyśl had started at the end of the 17th century and continued through the 18th century, hop production in the area did not enjoy a high level of success. In the late 1830s, German economist Joseph Jacob Flatau (Józef Jakub Flatau) developed a new variety of hops in the area that was a hybrid of Bavarian and Bohemian-Czech varieties of hops. This new variety of hop was very successful and demand was high; by the 1880s, annual production of the nowotomyski hop was as much as 50,000 to 60,000 cwt, and it was being exported to Bohemia, Szczecin, Gdańsk, Scandinavia, France, England, and Switzerland. The production of this type of hop had a profound economic impact on what had once been one of the poorest areas in the region. Hop production declined starting in the 1890s and continued until the conclusion of World War I. Production fluctuated between the wars, and during the occupation of Poland by Germany in World War II, 98% of the hops production area in the region was destroyed.

Nowotomyski is traditionally used in the production of Grodziskie beer.
