= Nasza Dyskobolia Grodzisk Wielkopolski =

Polish football club

- Full name: Klub Sportowy Nasza Dyskobolia Grodzisk Wielkopolski
- Founded: 2017; 9 years ago
- Stadium: Stadion Dyskobolii Grodzisk Wielkopolski
- Capacity: 5,392
- Chairman: Filip Groszczyk
- Manager: Michał Zajączkowski
- League: V liga Greater Poland I
- 2024–25: V liga Greater Poland I, 3rd of 16
- Website: naszadyskobolia.pl/
Home colours	Away colours

Nasza Dyskobolia Grodzisk Wielkopolski is a Polish amateur football club based in Grodzisk Wielkopolski, currently playing in the V liga (Greater Poland group). It is a phoenix club of a defunct Dyskobolia Grodzisk Wielkopolski.

== Honours ==
- Klasa okręgowa (Greater Poland IV)
  - Runners-up: 2020–21
- Klasa A (group Poznań III)
  - Third place: 2018–19
- Klasa B (group Poznań IV)
  - Champions: 2017–18
