= Letnica (river) =

- Location of the mouth in Poland

Location
- Country: Poland
- Voivodeship: Greater Poland

Physical characteristics
- Source
  - location: Zdrój, Greater Poland Voivodeship
  - coordinates: 52°13′52″N 16°17′34″E
- Mouth
  - location: Obra
  - coordinates: 52°06′50″N 16°25′26″E

Letnica is a river of Poland, a tributary of the Obra. The river flows through the town of Grodzisk Wielkopolski.
