= Franciszek Ścigalski =

Franciszek Salezy Błażej Wincenty Ścigalski (29 January 1782 – 27 August or 27 September 1846) was a Polish composer, violinist and conductor.

== Life ==
Ścigalski was born on 29 January 1782 in Grodzisk Wielkopolski. His father was a musician from Lwówka, an official in Grodzisk and director of the band. He studied at the Obra, where there was a Cistercian monastery and where his uncle was a copyist. Later he attended the Mary Magdalene high school in Poznań where one of the music teachers was A. Braun, conductor of the school band. He taught singing and led vocal and instrumental ensembles in his high school and taught the violin. He was a member of a string quartet founded by Fr. Anthony H. Radziwill.

The tradition of music in his family was continued by his son Titus Arkadiusz and his half-brother Joseph was an organist in Grodzisk Wielkopolski.

He died on 27 August or 27 September in 1846 in Gniezno.

== Career ==
In 1821 he became conductor of the cathedral and held this position until 1825. In 1825 he returned to teaching in high school.

On 1 June 1834 he moved to Gniezno where he took over the conducting band of the cathedral and the position of first violinist (virtuoso). During his work in Gniezno he introduced the latest music repertoire and enriched it with his own compositions and arrangements. He was also the librarian and expanded the collections. He founded the Kkapitularnej music school.

== Works ==
Ścigalski's compositions are preserved in the archives of the Pauline monastery in Częstochowa and collections coming from Grodzisk Wielkopolski, as well as archdiocesan archives in Poznań and Gniezno, Kornik Library and monasteries in Obra, Gostyn and Poznan parish. Among them are:

- Missa Solemnis in G
- Missa in B
- Missa in Es
- Polonaise
- Salve Regina
- Symphony in D major
- Te Deum laudamus
- Ex litany D
- Veni Creator
