= Bernard of Wąbrzeźno =

Catholic Polish priest and Benedictine monk

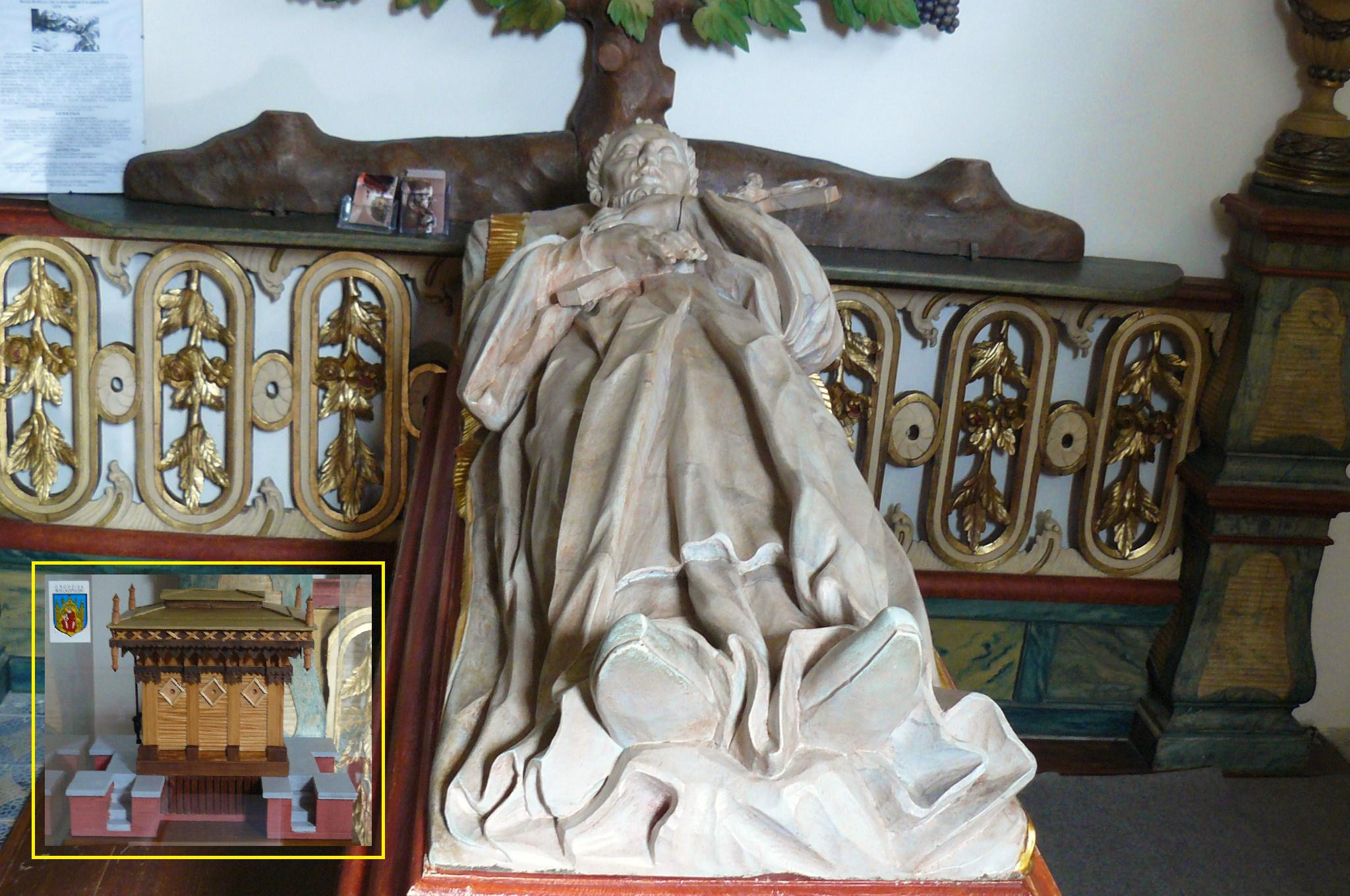
- Tomb in Lubiń Kościański

Personal life
- Born: Błażej Pęcharek; 3 February 1575 Wąbrzeźno, Kuyavia, Poland
- Died: 2 June 1603 (aged 28) Lubiń, Greater Poland, Poland

Religious life
- Religion: Catholic Church
- Order: Order of Saint Benedict

Bernard of Wąbrzeźno (Polish: Bernard z Wąbrzeźna, pronounced [ˈbɛrnard zvɔmˈbʐɛʑna], born Błażej Pęcharek, pronounced [ˈbwaʐɛj pɛ̃ˈxarɛk]; 3 February 1575 – 2 June 1603) was a Catholic priest and a Benedictine monk from the Benedictine Abbey in Lubiń, Poland. He has been named as a candidate for beatification several times, beginning in the 1730s and most recently in 2009.

A legend associated with Bernard was that he performed a miracle to restore water to the depleted well in the town of Grodzisk Wielkopolski, Poland. The well provided the water for the town's brewery, which was the primary source of income for the town; without the income from the brewery, its residents were starving. In addition to healing everybody who drank from it, the new water source was reputed to make the beer produced by the town's brewery far superior to what it had been able to produce before, and led to hundreds of years of prosperity for the town and its residents.

== Biography ==
Bernard was one of eight children of Paweł Pęcharek, the mayor of Wąbrzeźno, and his wife Dorota of Sasin. He was born in early 1575 in Wąbrzeźno, in the province of Royal Prussia in the Polish–Lithuanian Commonwealth, although the exact date is not known because a fire destroyed the town's church records in about 1751. His date of birth is estimated to be within a few days of 3 February, based on statements of his older sister Elizabeth who testified under oath in 1645 about his age and baptism. After graduating from the parish school at the age of 12, he was sent by his father to the Jesuit College in Poznań. At the college, he gained distinction for his selfless love of his neighbors and his compassion for the sick and the poor. At the age of 24 he entered the novitiate in the Benedictine abbey in Lubiń, where he soon became master of novices at an unusually young age due to his ability to relate to young people. His goal was to teach in a Catholic school even though it was a period of great turmoil in the church, with many parishes leaving the church and becoming protestant churches.

Bernard lived in the abbey for four years. He advanced to the priesthood in 1602, but died on 2 June 1603, probably of tuberculosis, in the odor of sanctity. According to written biographies, he often spent many hours in vigils and was always the first to prayer, and eager to perform hard work. He was remembered for his great love of the spiritual life.

== Beatification process ==
After Bernard's death, many people came forward to testify of the miracles he had performed and that miracles had appeared at his grave. Starting in the 1730s, the Archbishop of Poznań began collecting materials to produce biographies and testimonies of the miracles of Bernard. After his death, the documents needed for the process of beatification were filed in Rome. However, many of the Vatican archives were lost during the occupation of Rome by Napoleon's Army in the late 1700s, including some of the testimonies of the bishops of Poznań. Further attempts were made in later years, but were interrupted during the Partitions of Poland, and the wars and occupations of Poland during the first and second world wars. In 1968, the Metropolitan Archbishop of Poznań, Antoni Baraniak, formed a historical commission to resume the process. However, due to the deaths of members of this and other committees, the work slowed. In the early 2000s, attempts to restart the process and collect the necessary documentation resulted in the initiation of the beatification process on 18 March 2009 in Poznań.

== Legacy ==
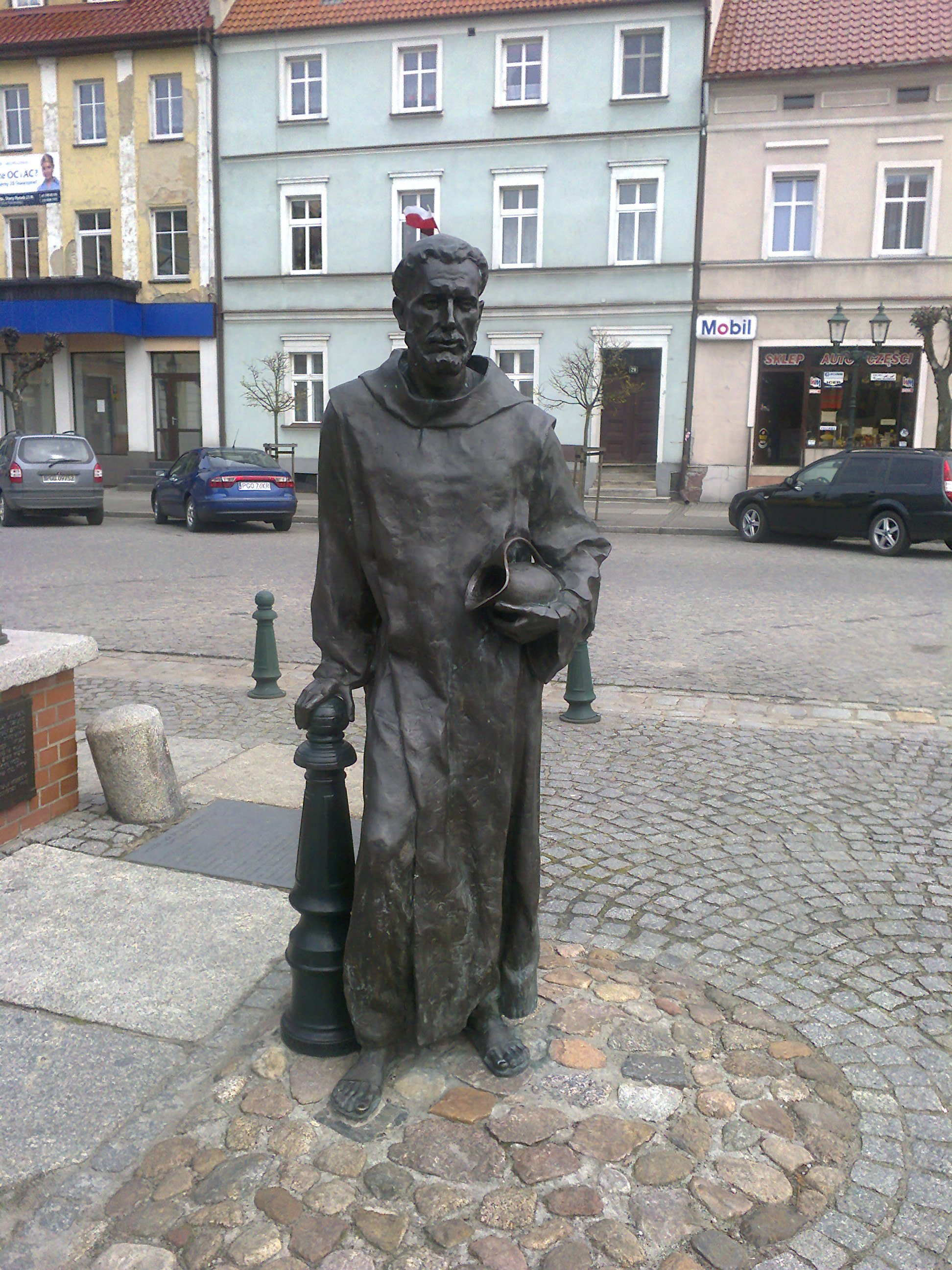
Statue of Bernard of Wąbrzeźno in Grodzisk Wielkopolski

One of the legends associated with father Bernard was that some time around 1603, he arrived in the town of Grodzisk Wielkopolski from the Benedictine monastery in Lubiń to find the residents starving and the town's wells depleted. The brewery was the primary source of income for the town and the hospital. Bernard prayed for the wells, and a new source of water suddenly filled the Old Market Well. Legends claimed that the newly refilled well had the ability to make whoever drank from it healthy again, and the beer that was produced from the water was far superior to any of the beer the brewers had been able to produce before. The well became a municipal treasure and was given credit for the commercial success of the town's breweries over the centuries to follow. Between the years 1620 and 1815, the residents of Grodzisk made an annual pilgrimage to Bernard's tomb, to bring a huge barrel of the beer that they made from the well as a show of gratitude. The tradition was resumed in 2003, on the urging of Henryk Szymański, the mayor of Grodzisk Wielkopolski. On 5 September 2009, the city unveiled a sculpture of Father Bernard, 7 feet (2 m) tall, next to the Old Market Well.
