= Grodzisk Wielkopolski =

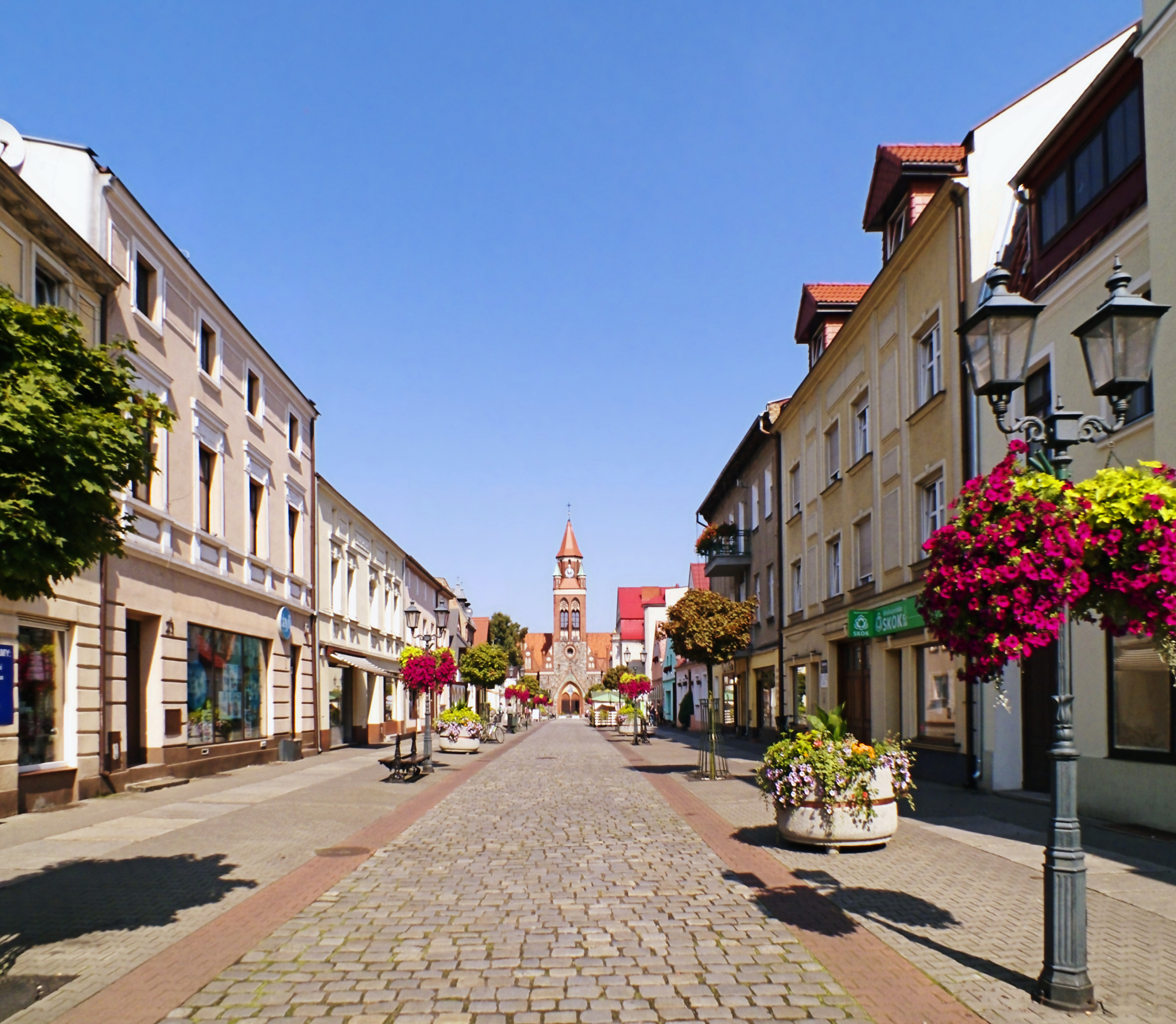
- Szeroka street in the town centre

- Flag Coat of arms

- Location within Poland
- Coordinates: 52°14′N 16°22′E
- Country: Poland
- Voivodeship: Greater Poland
- County: Grodzisk
- Gmina: Grodzisk Wielkopolski
- First mentioned: 1257
- Town rights: 1303

Government
  - Mayor: Piotr Hojan

Area
  - Total: 18.09 km^{2} (6.98 sq mi)

Population (2006)
  - Total: 13,703
  - Density: 757.5/km^{2} (1,962/sq mi)
- Time zone: UTC+1 (CET)
  - Summer (DST): UTC+2 (CEST)
- Postal code: 62-065
- Area code: +48 61
- Car plates: PGO
- Website: http://www.grodzisk.wlkp.pl

Grodzisk Wielkopolski [ˈɡrɔd͡ʑizɡ‿vʲɛlkɔˈpɔlskʲi] is a town in western Poland, in Greater Poland Voivodeship (Wielkopolskie), with a population of 13,703 (2006). It is the seat of Grodzisk County, and also of the smaller administrative district called Gmina Grodzisk Wielkopolski. It is situated on the Letnica River. The suffix "Wielkopolski" distinguishes it from the town of Grodzisk Mazowiecki in east-central Poland.

A town that developed from an early medieval fortified stronghold, Grodzisk is a historic center for brewing and meat production. It has become known as the place of origin of the Grodziskie beer style, and in modern times as the home of the Dyskobolia Grodzisk Wielkopolski football club, which competed in European competitions in the 2000s, achieving victories against much higher ranked and more acclaimed European clubs.

== History ==
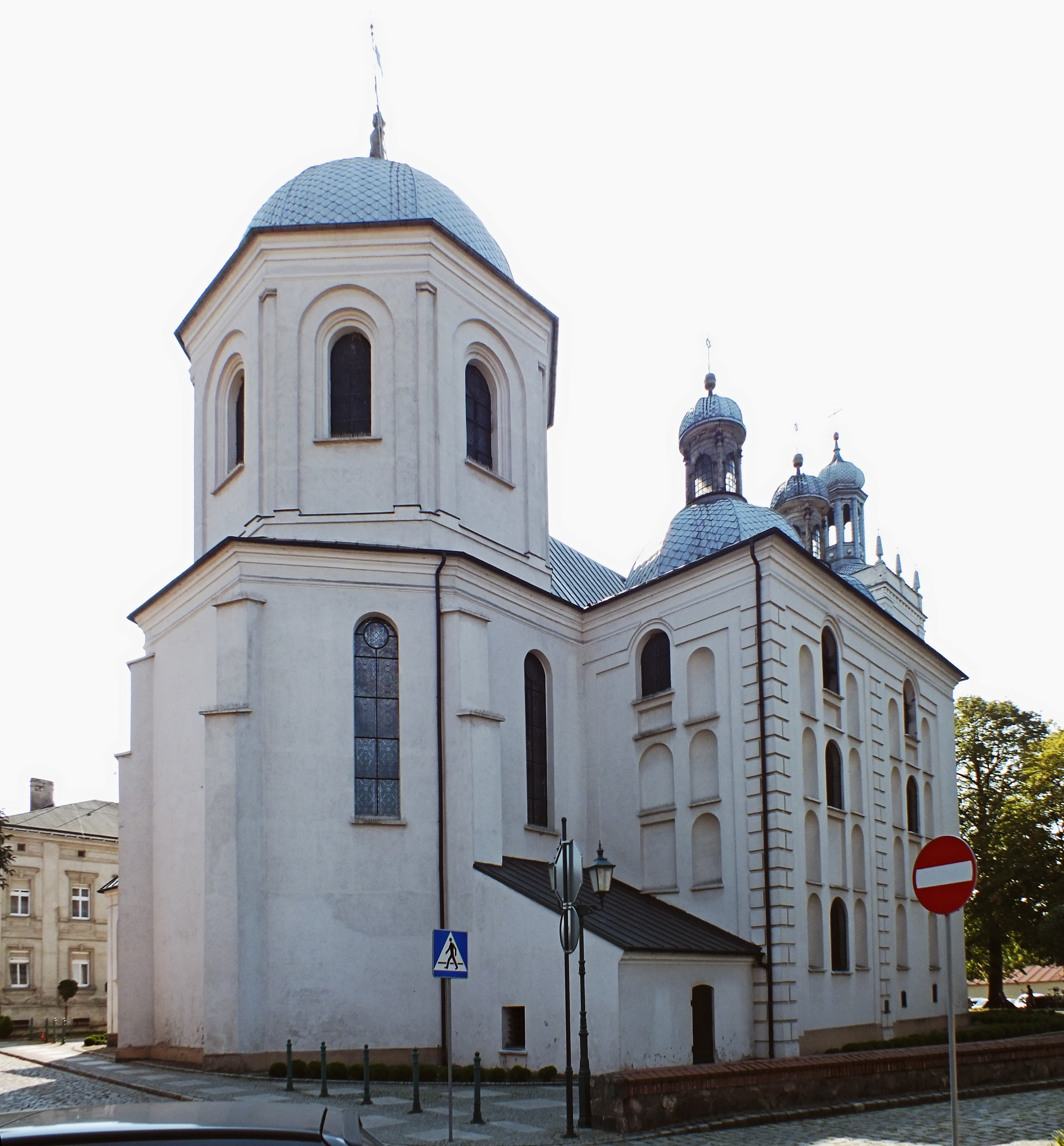
Church of Saint Saint Hedwig, High Duchess consort of Poland

The settlement was first mentioned in 1257 by the name of Grodisze in a document by Przemysł I of Greater Poland. It was referred to as a village belonging to the Cistercians.

The exact date when the town received its charter is unknown. Documents say that the town definitely had its town charter in 1303. It was a private town of Polish noble families of Ostroróg and Opaliński, administratively located in the Kościan County in the Poznań Voivodeship in the Greater Poland Province of the Kingdom of Poland.

The first Jews settled in the town at the beginning of the 16th century. The first document to back this up was in 1505, mentioning the Jew Abraham of Grodzisk In Yiddish and Hebrew, the town is known as גרידץ (Gritz or Gritza)

Stanisław Ostroróg as a Lutheran in 1563 gave the local church to Protestants and he also founded a new school in the town. Grodzisk became an important printing center for the Polish Reformation, however in 1594 Jan Ostroróg as a supporter of Catholicism reintroduced Catholicism in the town.

In 1593, the census for Grodzisk Wielkopolski said that the population was approximately 1,160. The town charter was renewed with the inclusion of a new town about 150 metres from the old town. In 1601, the first privileges for the brewery were awarded. The town quickly became important for the production of beer (Grodziskie style). At the end of the 18th century, there were 53 breweries in the town. Also, traditions of meat production in the local butchers' guild date back to the 17th century, and today Grodzisk is known for its variety of traditional meat products (see Cuisine below). In 1626, the mayor of the city changed to the Opaliński family. They remained as mayors until 1775.

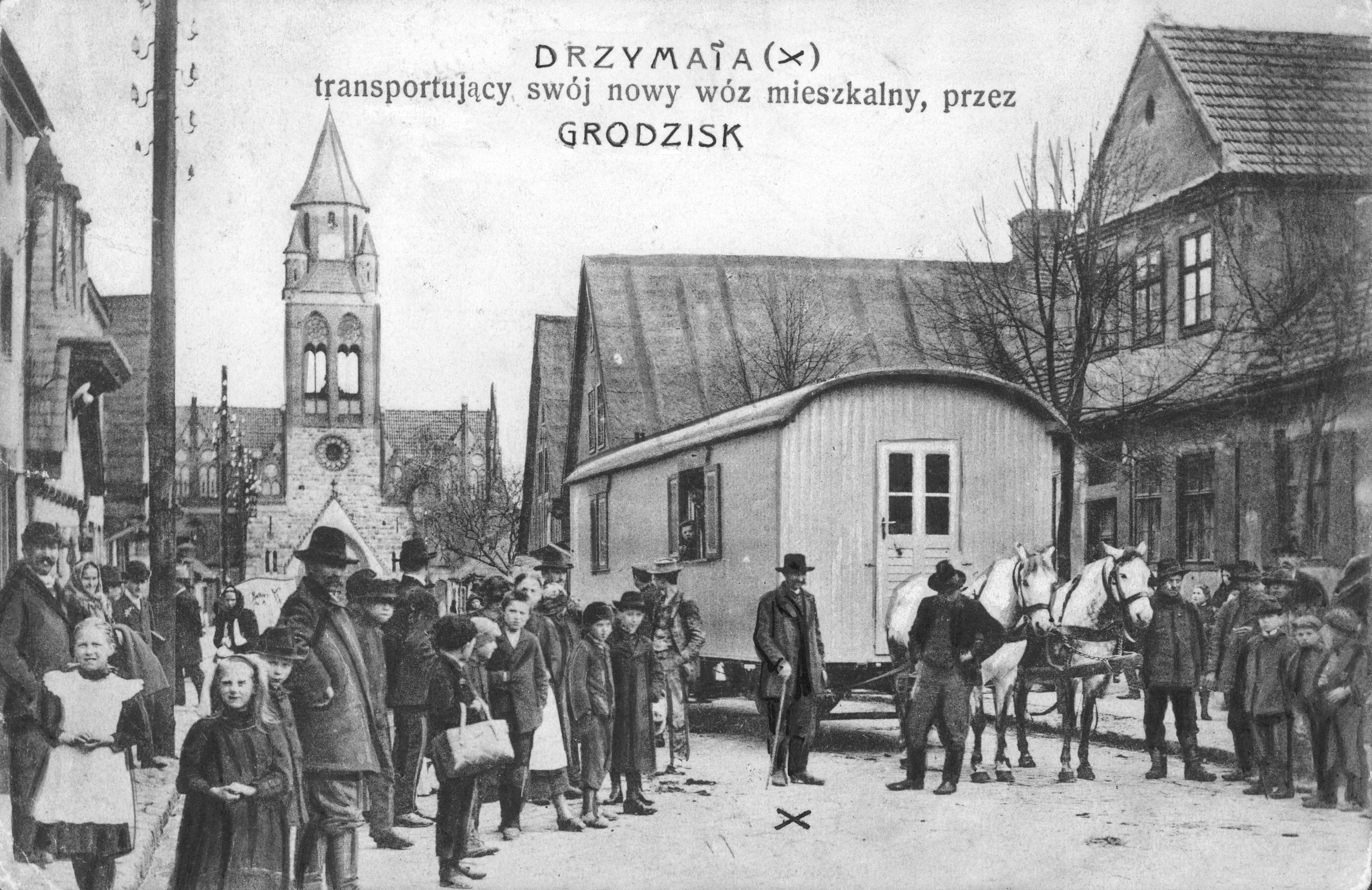
Michał Drzymała in Grodzisk in 1908

In 1793, the town was annexed by Prussia in the Second Partition of Poland. Grodzisk was an important insurgent center during the Polish Kościuszko Uprising in 1794. After the successful Greater Poland uprising of 1806, it was regained by Poles and included within the short-lived Duchy of Warsaw, and in 1815 it was reannexed by Prussia, under the Germanized name Grätz. In the Greater Poland uprising (1848) during the Revolutions of 1848 a battle was fought between the Polish insurgents and Prussian troops in the present-day district of Doktorowo. From 1887 to 1918, it was the seat of Kreis Grätz.

In November 1918, after World War I, Poland regained independence, and in December local Poles formed armed units in attempt to rejoin Poland. Poles took control of the town without fighting, however volunteers from Grodzisk participated in the Greater Poland uprising in other places, as well as in the Polish–Soviet War. The town was confirmed as part of Poland in the 1919 Treaty of Versailles, and was until 1932 the seat of a county or powiat.

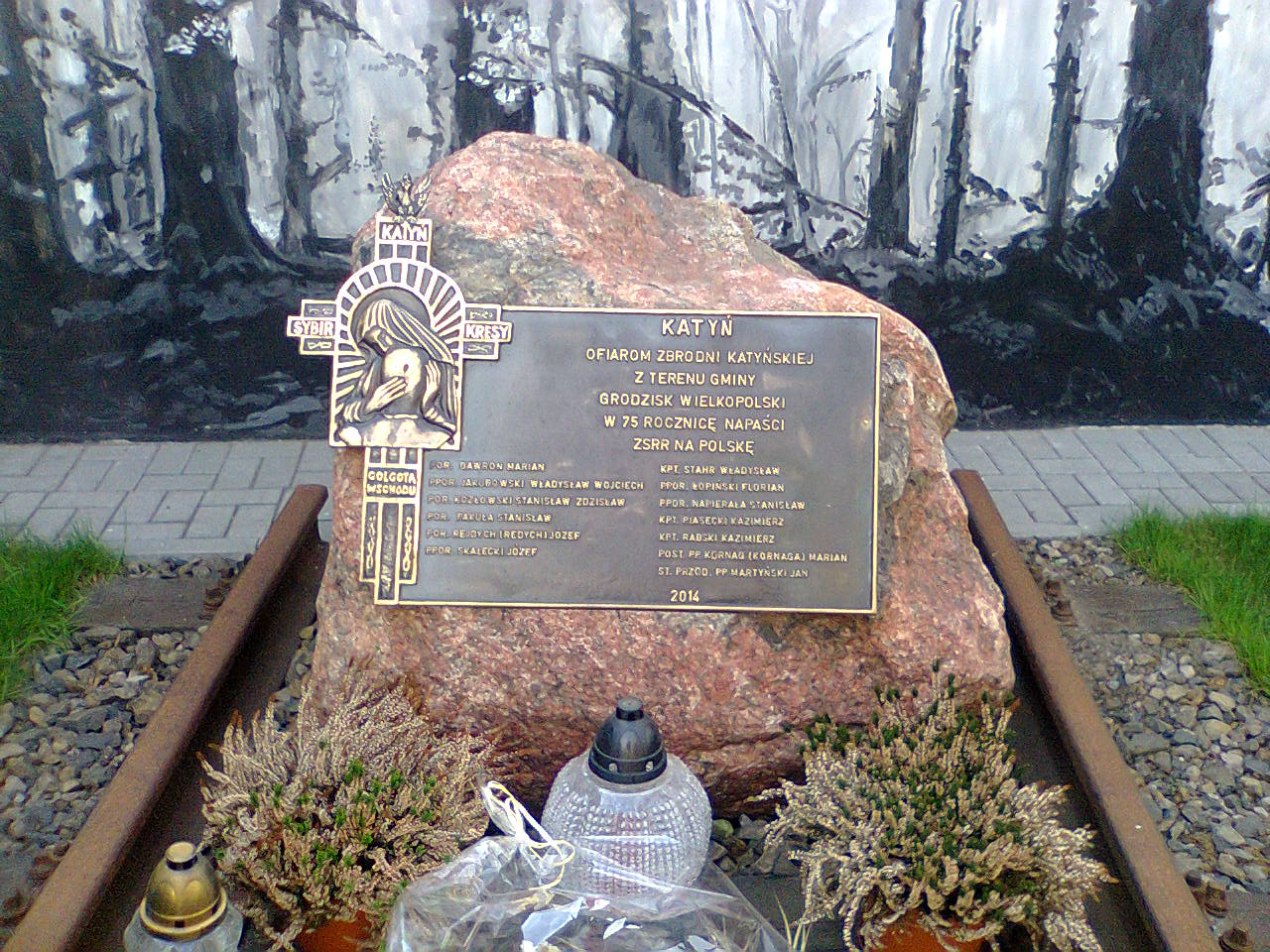
Monument to local Poles murdered in the Katyn massacre

During World War II, the town was under German occupation. In Młyniewo, a nearby village, a transit camp was formed for onward transport to Nazi concentration camps, initially for Jews and later for Poles and French, Serbian, English and Soviet prisoners of war. Poles were also subjected to expulsions, the first of which was carried out in November 1939, nevertheless, the Polish resistance movement was active in the town. Poles from Grodzisk were among the victims of massacres perpetrated during the genocidal Intelligenzaktion campaign at Rydzyna in November 1939. Several Poles from Grodzisk, including policemen, doctors, and a co-founder of the local Dyskobolia Grodzisk Wielkopolski football club, were murdered by the Russians in the large Katyn massacre in April–May 1940. The Germans operated a Nazi prison in the town, and a subcamp of the Stalag XXI-C prisoner-of-war camp, which in June 1941 was converted into the Stalag XXI-E POW camp for British, Polish and Serbian POWs, and into the Oflag XXI-C POW camp for Allied officers in March 1942. Heliodor Jankiewicz, commander of the local unit of the Narodowa Organizacja Bojowa organization, was arrested by the Germans in September 1941, and then sentenced to death and executed the following year. On January 27, 1945, the city was taken by the Red Army, and afterwards restored to Poland.

After World War II, beer production declined and was discontinued in 1993. In 1999, Grodzisk again became a powiat seat when the powiats were reintroduced in the Polish administrative reforms.

== Culture ==
A historical museum called Muzeum Ziemi Grodziskiej is located in the town.

== Cuisine ==
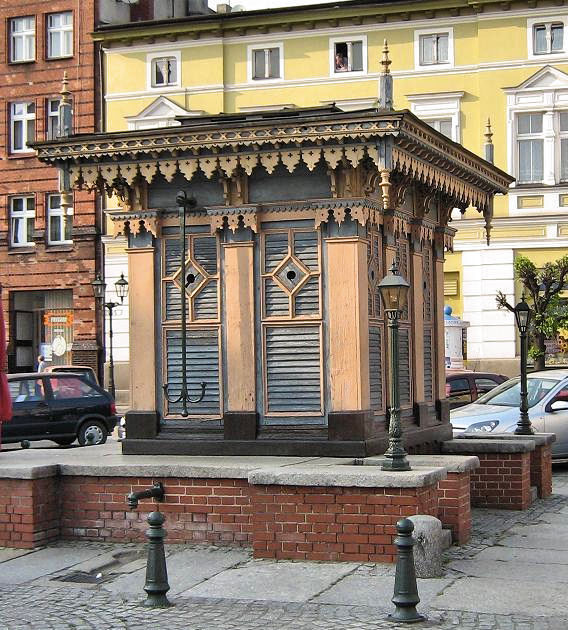
Commemorative well "of the blessed Bernard"

The Grodziskie style of beer originated in the town. Grodzisk is also known for its mineral water and traditional meat products. A commemorative pump stands in the central market square in front of the town hall.

The officially protected traditional foods originating from Grodzisk Wielkopolski (as designated by the Ministry of Agriculture and Rural Development of Poland) are various meat products, including kiełbasa grodziska, a local type of kiełbasa, salceson ozorowy grodziski, a local type of salceson, bułczanka grodziska, a local type of bułczanka (lunch meat made of pork, wheat roll and spices), and pasztetowa grodziska, a local type of pork pasztetowa (Polish liverwurst).

== Sport ==
The local football team is Nasza Dyskobolia Grodzisk Wielkopolski. It plays in the lower leagues, but continues the traditions of Dyskobolia Grodzisk Wielkopolski which in the 1990s and 2000s competed in the Ekstraklasa, the country's top flight, finishing 2nd in 2003 and 2005, and also the winner of the 2007 Polish Cup.

Their stadium hosts many professional teams during the summer and winter breaks, and temporarily is the home of Warta Poznań whilst their stadium is being modernised.

== International relations ==
=== Twin towns — Sister cities ===
Grodzisk Wielkopolski is twinned with:

- Betton, France
- Delligsen, Germany
- Merksplas, Belgium
- Torrelodones, Spain
- Biržai, Lithuania
- Dolyna, Ukraine

== Notable people ==
- Jonathan Alexandersohn (d.1869), rabbi
- Grzegorz Balcerek (born 1954), Roman Catholic bishop
- Michał Drzymała (1857–1937), Polish national activist
- Rudolf Mosse (1843–1920), publisher and philanthropist
- Albert Mosse (1846–1925), German judge and legal scholar
- Patrycja Piechowiak (born 1992), weightlifter
- Franciszek Ścigalski (1782–1846), Polish composer, violinist and conductor
- Włodzimierz Trzebiatowski (1906–1982), chemist, physicist and mathematician

== Gallery ==
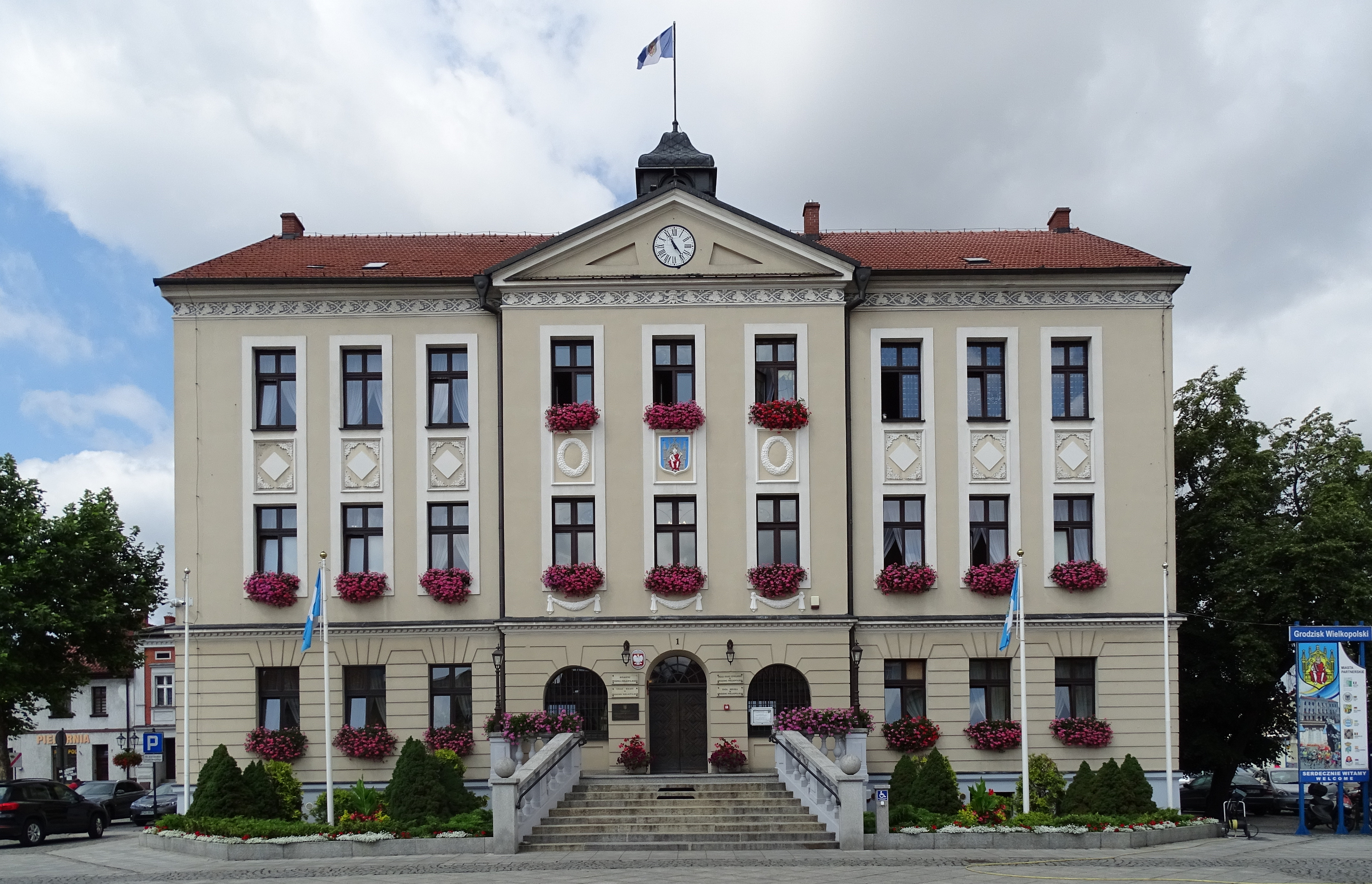
Town hall

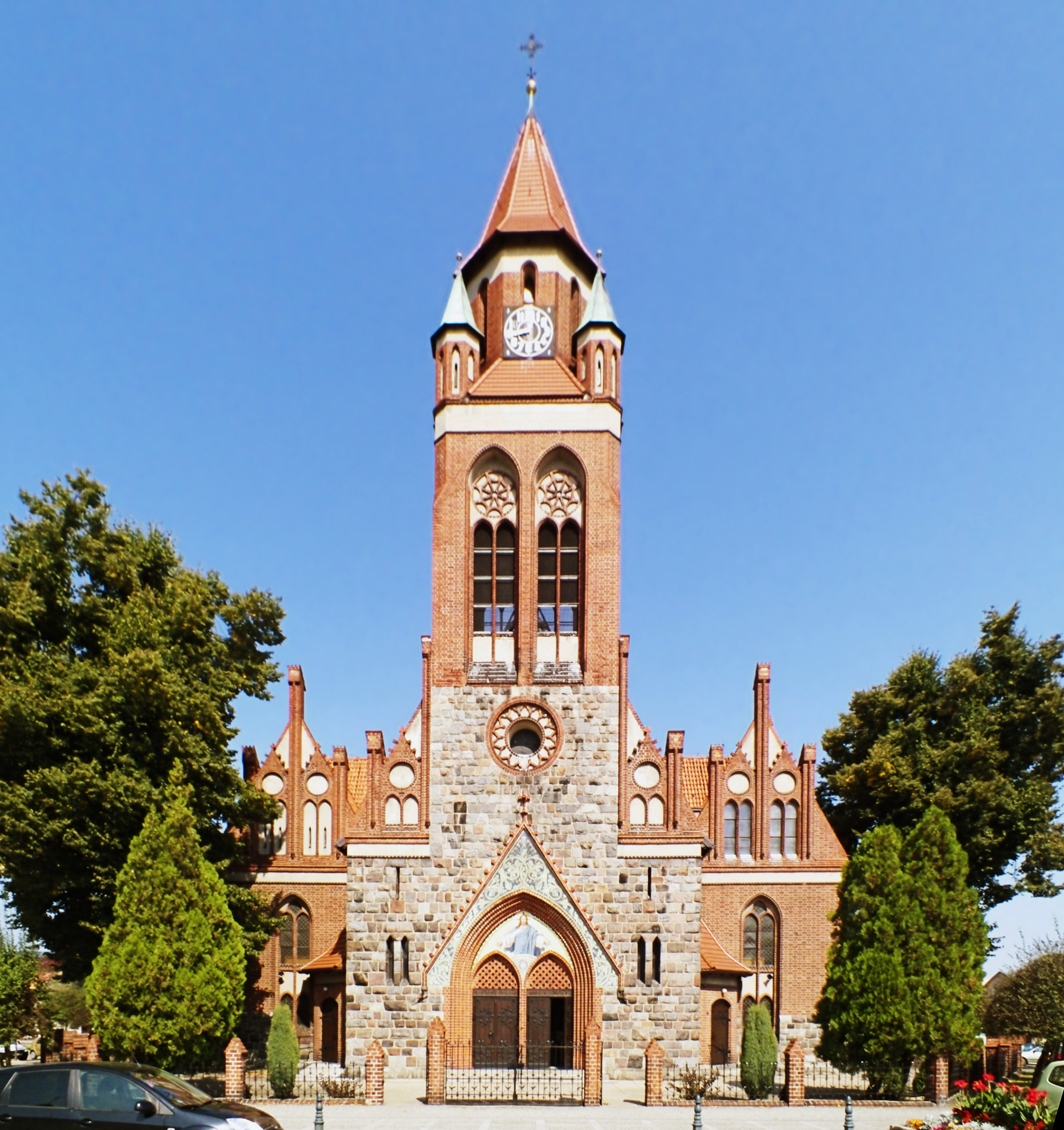
Sacred Heart church

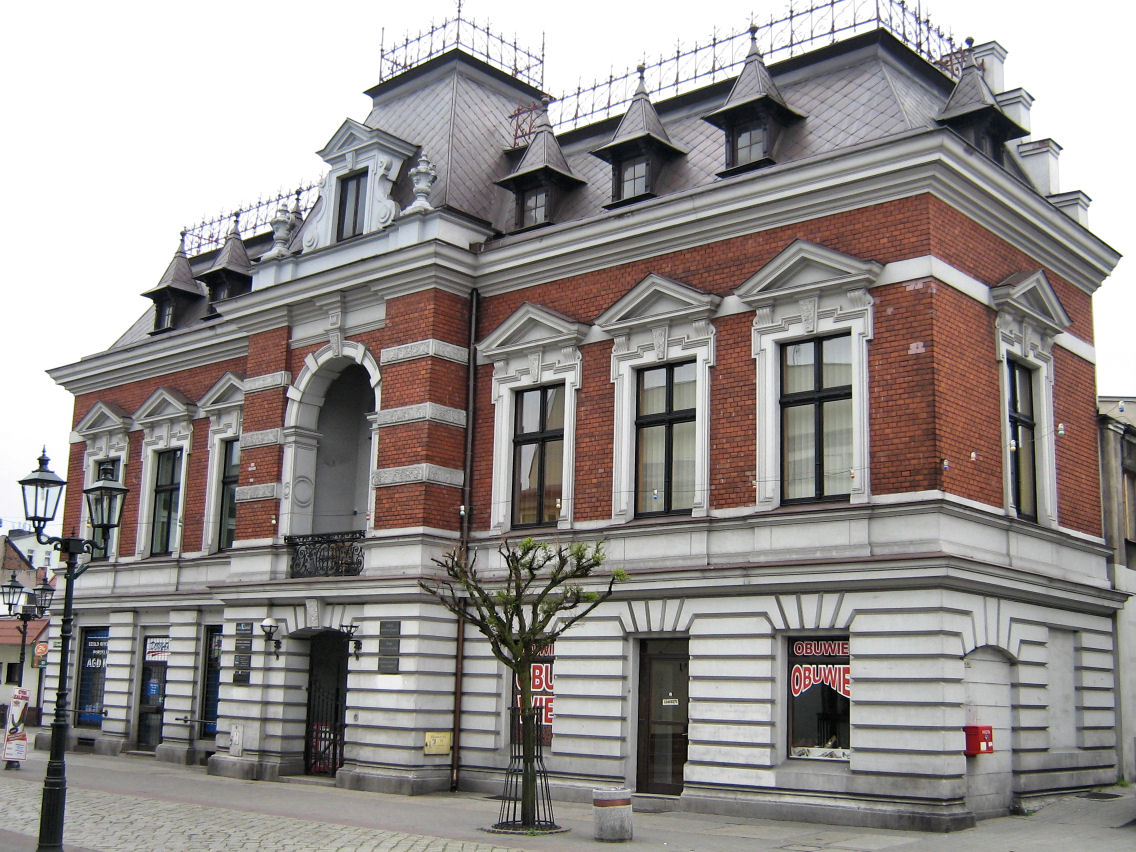
Craft guild

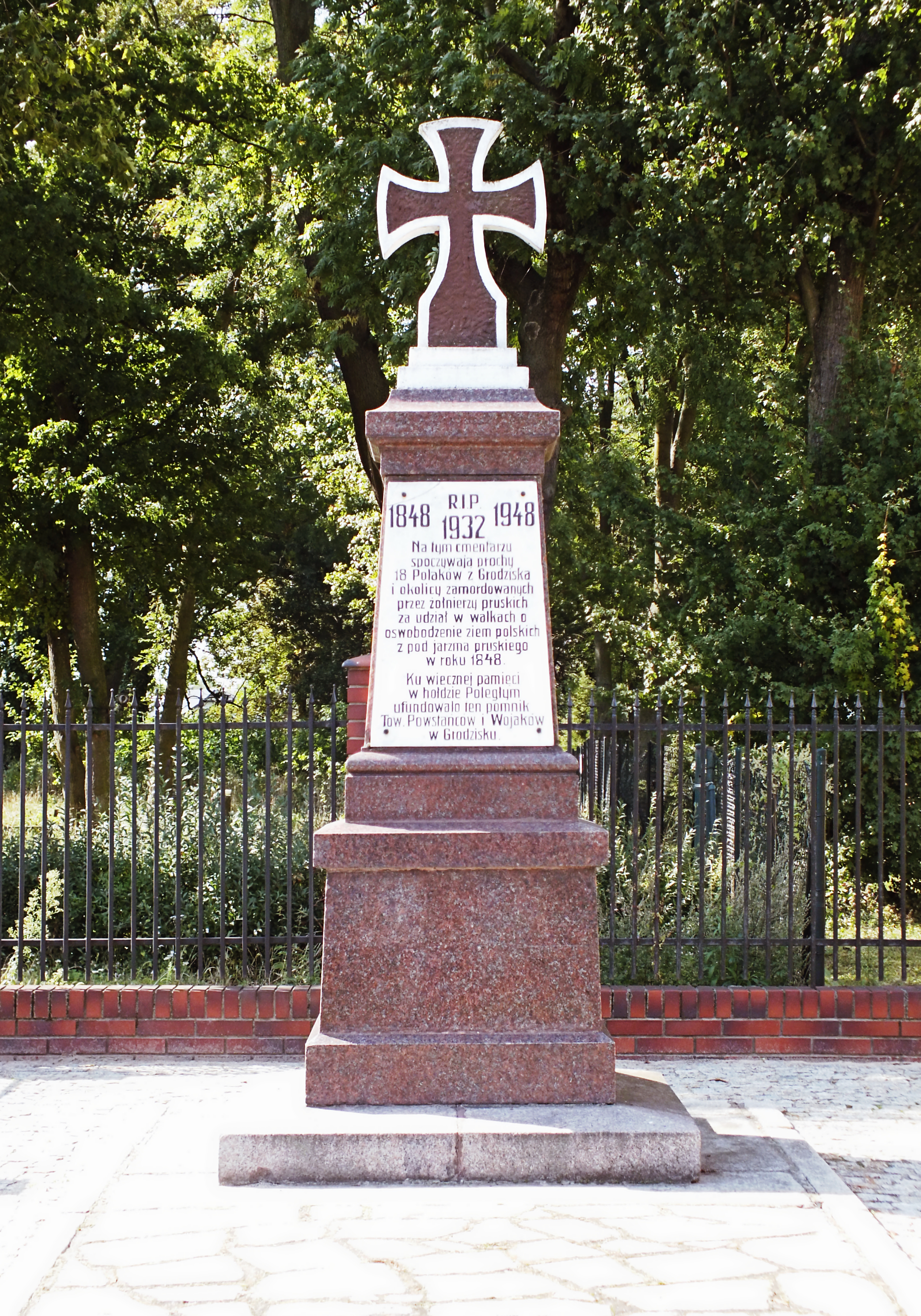
Monument to fallen Polish insurgents of 1848

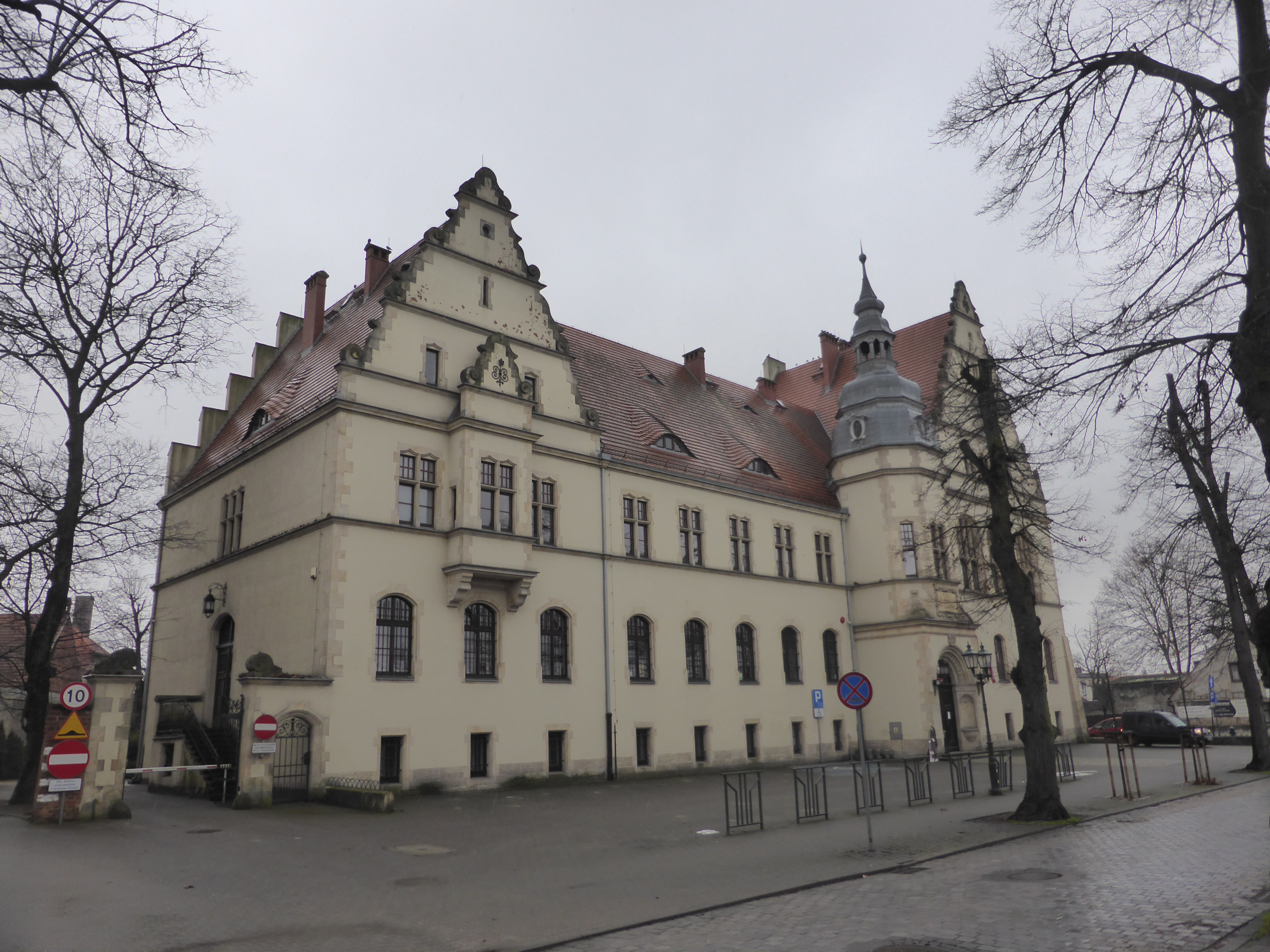
District court

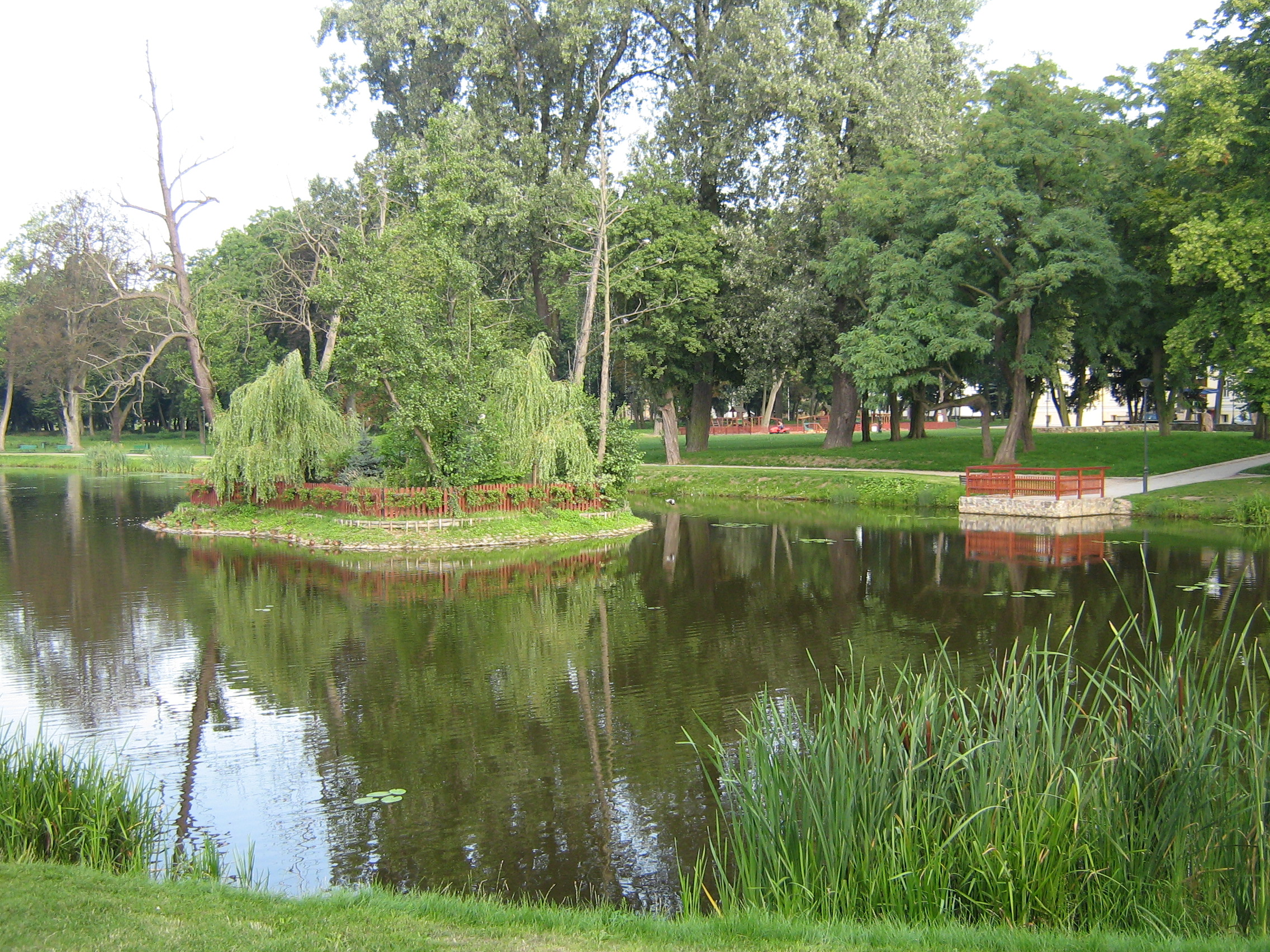
Park
