= Młyniewo =

Settlement in Poland

- Settlement
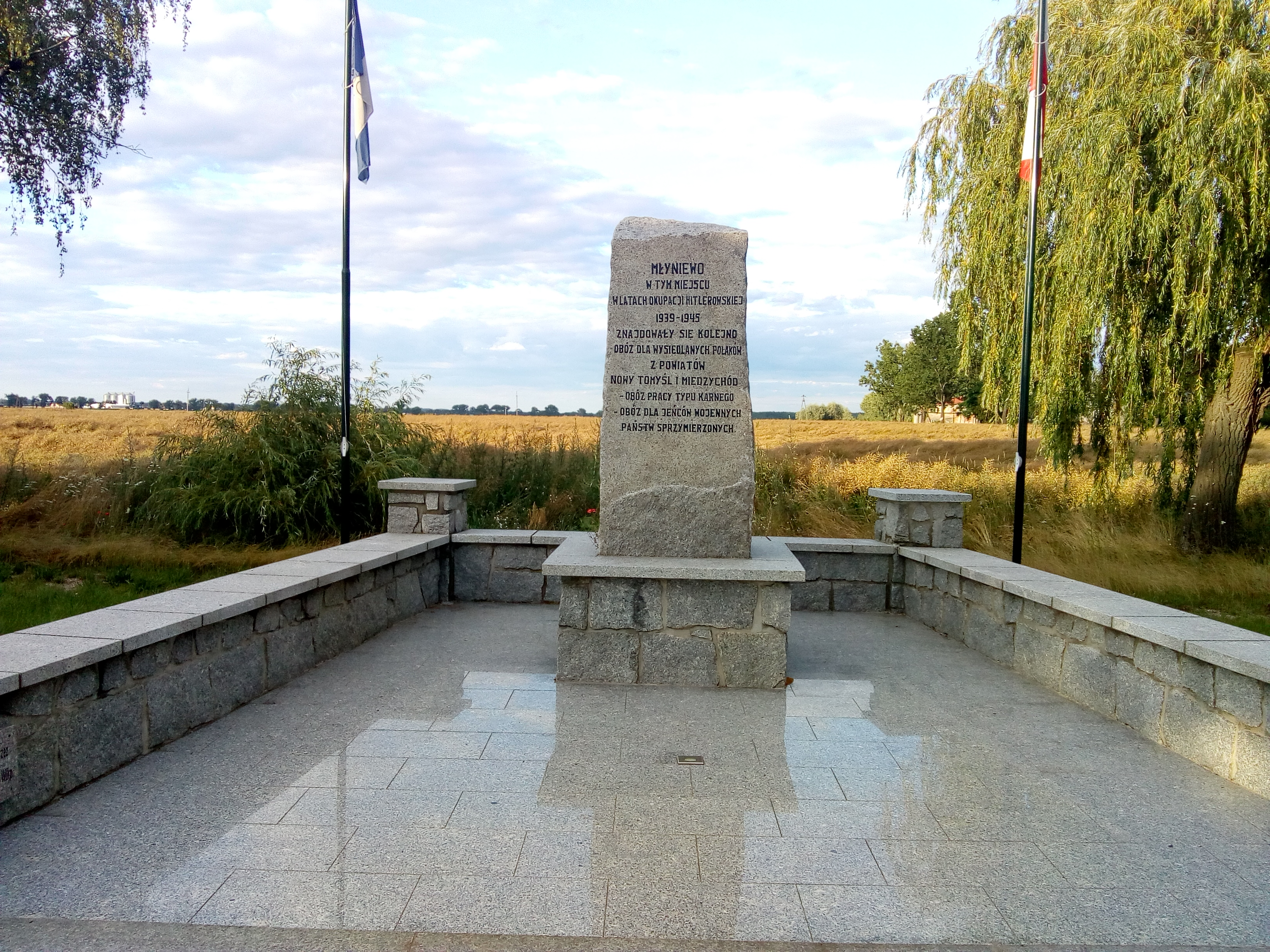
- Memorial at the site of the former Nazi German camp in Młyniewo

- Location within Poland
- Coordinates: 52°12′12″N 16°22′46″E
- Country: Poland
- Voivodeship: Greater Poland
- County: Grodzisk
- Gmina: Grodzisk Wielkopolski
- Time zone: UTC+1 (CET)
  - Summer (DST): UTC+2 (CEST)
- Vehicle registration: PGO

Młyniewo is a settlement in the administrative district of Gmina Grodzisk Wielkopolski, within Grodzisk County, Greater Poland Voivodeship, in western Poland.

== History ==
Młyniewo was a private village of Polish nobility, administratively located in the Kościan County in the Poznań Voivodeship in the Greater Poland Province of the Kingdom of Poland.

During the German occupation of Poland (World War II), in 1939–1940, the occupiers operated a transit camp for expelled Poles from the region in Młyniewo. The camp's inmates slept on a floor covered with a thin layer of straw. Women with children were kept in separate barracks. Afterwards, it was converted into a prisoner-of-war camp for Allied POWs. There is a memorial at the site.
