= Lubiń, Kościan County =

Lubiń
- Village
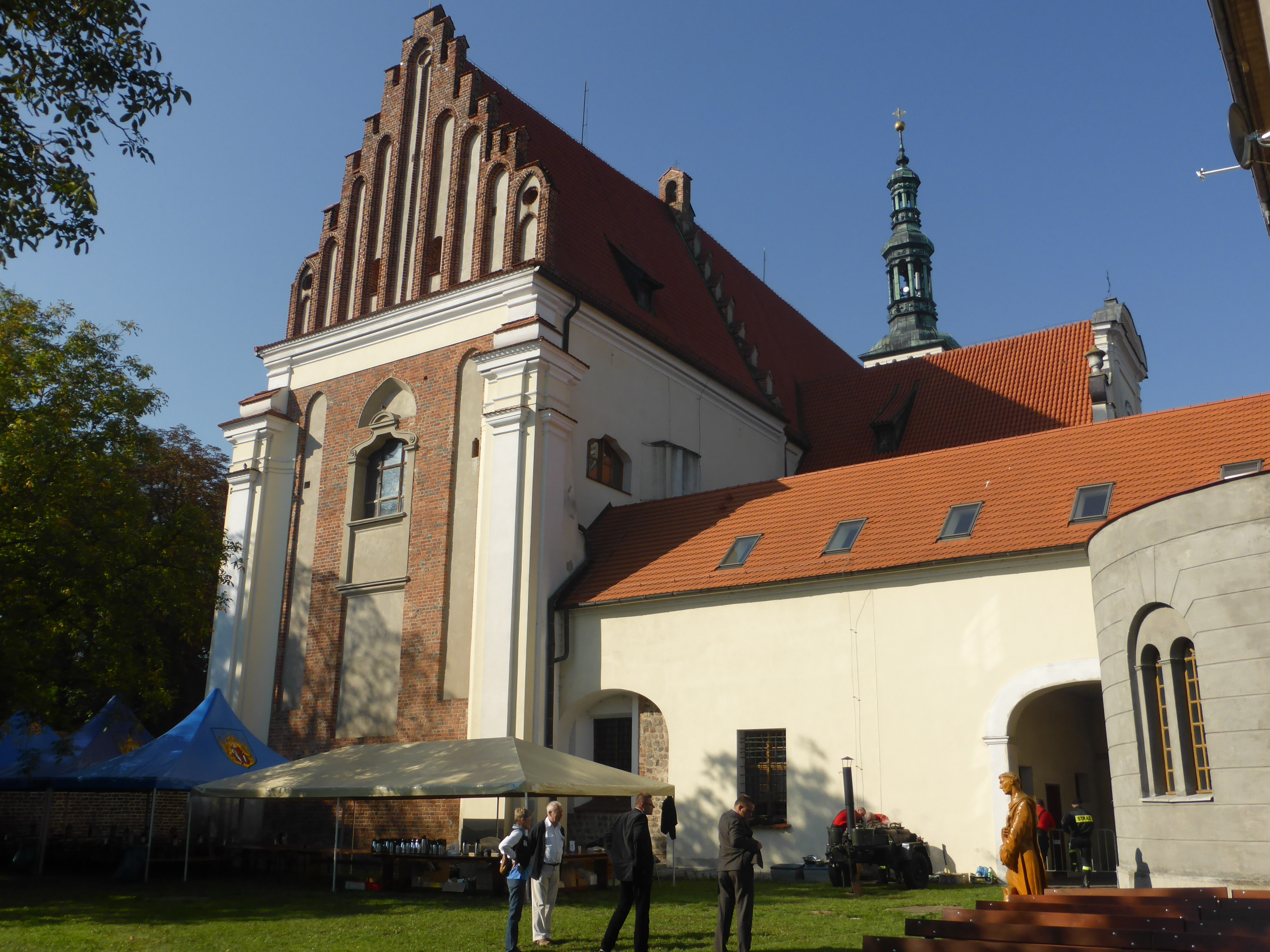
- Church of the Nativity of the Blessed Virgin Mary

- Location within Poland
- Coordinates: 51°57′54″N 16°53′59″E
- Country: Poland
- Voivodeship: Greater Poland
- County: Kościan
- Gmina: Krzywiń

Lubiń [ˈlubiɲ] is a village in the administrative district of Gmina Krzywiń, within Kościan County, Greater Poland Voivodeship, in west-central Poland.

== Church of the Nativity of the Blessed Virgin Mary ==
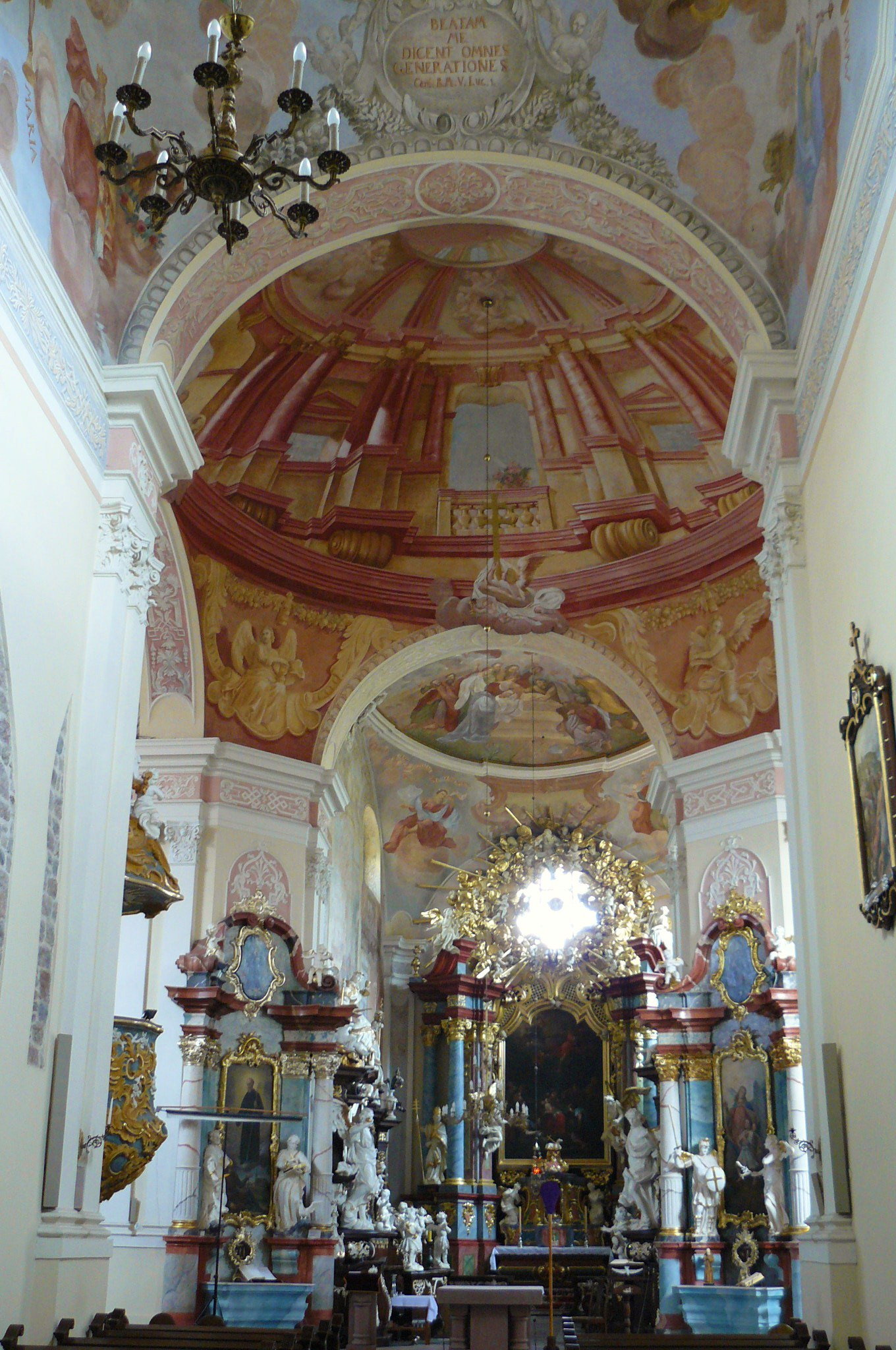
Church interior

Lubiń is the site of the Church of the Nativity of the Blessed Virgin Mary. The present structure dates from the 18th century but rests on 12th century Romanesque foundations, and other Gothic structural elements. A number of sarcophagi are incorporated in the nave and nave chapel, notably the tombs of Władysław III Spindleshanks and the abbot Bernard of Wąbrzeźno. The Baroque decor includes stalls with integrated work by Jan Jerzy Urbański.

The church is one of Poland's official national Historic Monuments as designated December 12, 2009, and tracked by the National Heritage Board of Poland.
