= Dyskobolia Grodzisk Wielkopolski Stadium =

Football stadium

Coordinates: 52°13′44.51″N 16°22′41.26″E

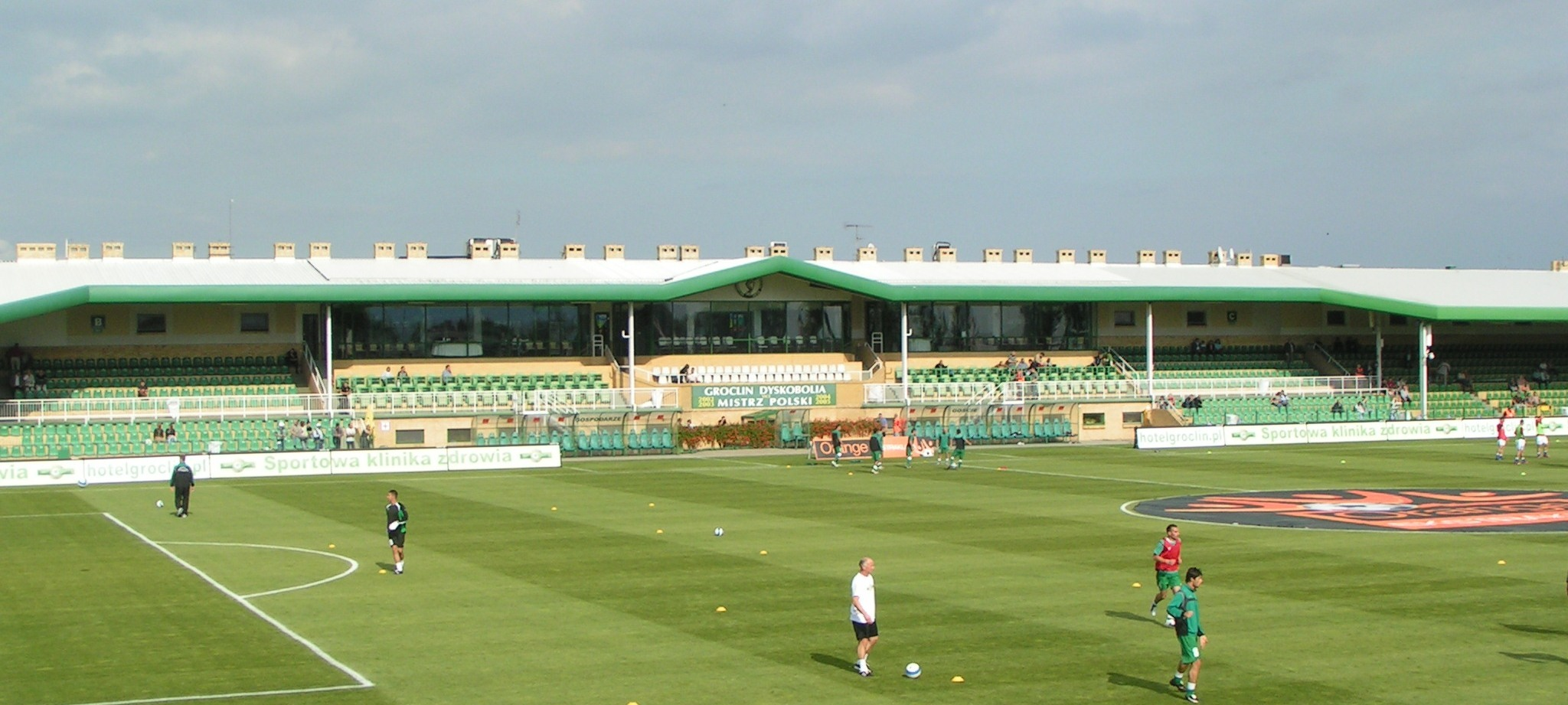
- Main stadium stands
- Interactive map of Dyskobolia Grodzisk Wielkopolski Stadium
- Location: ul. Powstańców Chocieszyńskich 52, Grodzisk Wielkopolski, Poland
- Owner: City of Grodzisk Wielkopolski
- Capacity: 5,383
- Surface: Grass
- Field size: 105 × 68m

Construction
- Opened: 11 November 1925

Tenants
- Nasza Dyskobolia Grodzisk Wielkopolski; Warta Poznań (2018, 2020–2025)

The Dyskobolia Grodzisk Wielkopolski Stadium (Polish: Stadion Dyskobolii Grodzisk Wielkopolski) is a multi-use stadium in Grodzisk Wielkopolski, Poland. The stadium is used mostly for football matches and is the home ground of Nasza Dyskobolia Grodzisk Wielkopolski, and was previously (2020–2025) used by Warta Poznań to host their Ekstraklasa and I liga matches. It was originally built in 1925 and can hold 5,383 spectators.

It was the home ground of Dyskobolia Grodzisk Wielkopolski, until the above-mentioned club was dissolved in 2015 and replaced with phoenix club Nasza Dyskobolia Grodzisk Wielkopolski.

From 24 August 2023, the stadium is called Stadion Respect Energy, for sponsorship reasons.
