= Dyskobolia Grodzisk Wielkopolski =

Association football club

KS Dyskobolia Grodzisk Wielkopolski
- Full name: Klub Sportowy Dyskobolia Grodzisk Wielkopolski
- Nickname(s): Dyskobole (The Discoboli)
- Founded: 30 April 1922; 103 years ago
- Dissolved: December 2015; 9 years ago
- Ground: Stadion Dyskobolii Grodzisk Wielkopolski
- Capacity: 6,800
Home colours	Away colours

Dyskobolia Grodzisk Wielkopolski (Polish pronunciation: [dɨskɔˈbɔlja ˈɡrɔdʑizɡ vʲɛlkɔˈpɔlskʲi]), previously Groclin Dyskobolia Grodzisk Wielkopolski, was a Polish football club based in Grodzisk Wielkopolski, Greater Poland Voivodeship.

== History ==
Dyskobolia Grodzisk Wielkopolski was founded on 30 April 1922. Its logo shows the Discobolus.

During World War II, Stanisław Zdzisław Kozłowski, co-founder of the club, was among Poles murdered by the Russians in the large Katyn massacre in April–May 1940.

After several decades in lower league football, the club was taken over in the mid-1990s by Zbigniew Drzymała, president of the Inter Groclin Auto company, and enjoyed an instant string of promotions culminating in the promotion to top level football in 1997.

Not having its own youth backbone, the club was dependent on players predominantly over 30 years of age, mostly with former league experience. After performing reasonably in the autumn period of the 1997–98 season, they experienced a sudden drop in form, resulting in relegation. However, within a year, Dyskobolia was able to return to the top flight, winning the I liga. Although now having many younger and more success-hungry players in the squad, the club performed disastrously in the autumn of 1999, garnering just five points from fifteen games. An unexpected (and some say suspicious) form increase in the spring resulted in eight victories in a row, which was more than enough to fight off relegation. The club remained in the top flight, enjoying second place honors on two occasions (2003 and 2005). Managers have included Dusan Radolsky, and Andrzej Janeczek. The first runner-up title made them eligible to play in the UEFA Cup, in which they eliminated Hertha BSC and Manchester City (with three goals in four games) before falling to Girondins Bordeaux. Their second UEFA Cup run was less successful, resulting in a first round exit against RC Lens.

Dyskobolia was the original winner of the 2004–05 Polish Cup. By the resolution of the PZPN management board of 2 September 2020, the team was deprived of this title in connection with proven cases of match-fixing. In July 2008, Dyskobolia announced its intention to merge with Polonia Warsaw, after the expected merger with Śląsk Wrocław fell through. Polonia replaced Dyskobolia in the Ekstraklasa while the new Dyskobolia team joined the IV liga, the fifth tier of the Polish league pyramid.

In the 2015–16 season, Dyskobolia Grodzisk Wielkopolski played in the regional league (klasa okręgowa), but withdrew after the autumn round. In the following seasons, a team called Nasza Dyskobolia Grodzisk Wielkopolski started to play at the lower levels, referring to the club's tradition.

== Colours ==
The club colours were green and white.

== Honours ==
- Ekstraklasa
  - Runners-up: 2002–03, 2004–05
- Polish Cup
  - Winners: 2006–07
- Ekstraklasa Cup
  - Winners: 2006–07, 2007–08

== Fans ==
Dyskobolia, although no longer attracted as many fans as in the second division and Ekstraklasa years, possessed a small but loyal group of active supporters called Szczuny z Landu.

The fans had two fan-clubs outside their home town, in Rakoniewice and Kąkolewo, and the fans had a strong friendship with fans of Górnik Łęczyca.

Back in the top flight they competed in the Greater Poland Derby against Lech Poznań and Amica Wronki. The latter were widely considered to be their greatest rivals, a rivalry which has been renewed since the Amica's phoenix-predecessor club Błękitni Wronki has been re-established in 2007, the two frequently playing in the same division.

== Notable players ==
Internationally capped players

- Mariusz Lewandowski, defender, capped for the Poland national football team
- Sebastian Mila, midfield, capped for the Poland national football team
- Radosław Sobolewski, midfield, capped for the Poland national football team
- Piotr Świerczewski, midfield, capped for the Poland national football team
- Grzegorz Rasiak, striker, capped for the Poland national football team
- Ivica Križanac, defender, capped for the Croatia national football team
- Mićo Vranješ, defender, capped for the Yugoslavia national under-21 football team
- Radosław Majewski, midfield, capped for the Poland national football team

== Dyskobolia in Europe ==
Season	Competition	Round		Club	Score
2001	Intertoto Cup	1R	(Bulgaria)	Spartak Varna	1–0, 0–4
2003–04	UEFA Cup	Q	(Lithuania)	Atlantas	2–0, 4–1
2003–04	UEFA Cup	1R	(Germany)	Hertha	0–0, 1–0
2003–04	UEFA Cup	2R	(England)	Manchester City	1–1, 0–0
2003–04	UEFA Cup	3R	(France)	Girondins de Bordeaux	0–1, 1–4
2005–06	UEFA Cup	2Q	(Slovakia)	Dukla Banská Bystrica	4–1, 0–0
2005–06	UEFA Cup	1R	(France)	Lens	1–1, 2–4
2007–08	UEFA Cup	1Q	(Azerbaijan)	Araz Imisli	0–0, 1–0
2007–08	UEFA Cup	2Q	(Kazakhstan)	Tobol Kostanay	1–0, 2–0
2007–08	UEFA Cup	1R	(Serbia)	Crvena Zvezda	0–1, 0–1

== See also ==
- Football in Poland
- List of football teams
