= Piotry =

- Village
- Location within Poland
- Coordinates: 52°28′N 15°57′E
- Country: Poland
- Voivodeship: Greater Poland
- County: Nowy Tomyśl
- Gmina: Miedzichowo

Piotry [ˈpjɔtrɨ] is a village in the administrative district of Gmina Miedzichowo, within Nowy Tomyśl County, Greater Poland Voivodeship, in west-central Poland.
