= Przychodzko =

- Village
- Location within Poland
- Coordinates: 52°19′N 15°55′E
- Country: Poland
- Voivodeship: Greater Poland
- County: Nowy Tomyśl
- Gmina: Zbąszyń

Przychodzko [pʂɨˈxɔt͡skɔ] is a village in the administrative district of Gmina Zbąszyń, within Nowy Tomyśl County, Greater Poland Voivodeship, in west-central Poland.
