= Kozłowo, Nowy Tomyśl County =

Kozłowo
- Village
- Location within Poland
- Coordinates: 52°19′N 16°28′E
- Country: Poland
- Voivodeship: Greater Poland
- County: Nowy Tomyśl
- Gmina: Opalenica
- Population: 222

Kozłowo [kɔˈzwɔvɔ] is a village in the administrative district of Gmina Opalenica, within Nowy Tomyśl County, Greater Poland Voivodeship, in west-central Poland.
