= Łomnica, Nowy Tomyśl County =

Łomnica
- Village
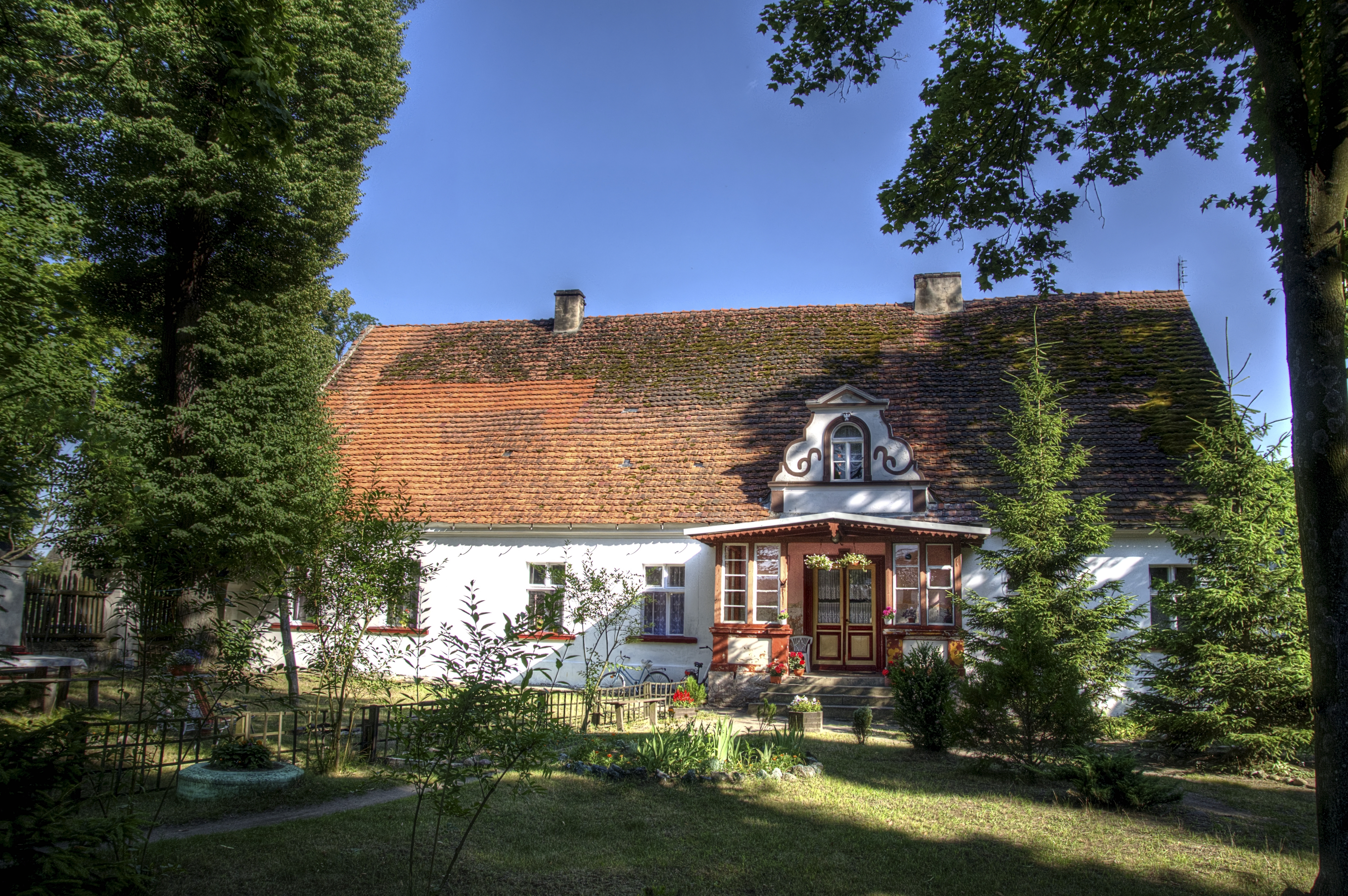

- Location within Poland
- Coordinates: 52°18′25″N 15°58′23″E
- Country: Poland
- Voivodeship: Greater Poland
- County: Nowy Tomyśl
- Gmina: Zbąszyń
- Time zone: UTC+1 (CET)
  - Summer (DST): UTC+2 (CEST)
- Vehicle registration: PNT

Łomnica [wɔmˈnit͡sa] is a village in the administrative district of Gmina Zbąszyń, within Nowy Tomyśl County, Greater Poland Voivodeship, in west-central Poland.

== History ==
Łomnica was a private village of Polish nobility, administratively located in the Kościan County in the Poznań Voivodeship in the Greater Poland Province of the Kingdom of Poland.

During World War II, on 23 January 1945, a German-perpetrated death march of prisoners from the dissolved camp in Żabikowo to the Sachsenhausen concentration camp stopped in Łomnica. The next day, the Germans committed a massacre of 17 prisoners.

== Transport ==
The A2 motorway passes nearby, north of the village.
