= Porażyn-Tartak =

- Settlement
- Location within Poland
- Coordinates: 52°18′03″N 16°17′24″E
- Country: Poland
- Voivodeship: Greater Poland
- County: Nowy Tomyśl
- Gmina: Opalenica

Porażyn-Tartak [pɔˈraʐɨn ˈtartak] is a settlement in the administrative district of Gmina Opalenica, within Nowy Tomyśl County, Greater Poland Voivodeship, in west-central Poland.
