= Drapak, Greater Poland Voivodeship =

Drapak
- Village
- Location within Poland
- Coordinates: 52°17′N 16°26′E
- Country: Poland
- Voivodeship: Greater Poland
- County: Nowy Tomyśl
- Gmina: Opalenica
- Population: 60

Drapak [ˈdrapak] is a village in the administrative district of Gmina Opalenica, within Nowy Tomyśl County, Greater Poland Voivodeship, in west-central Poland.
