= Dąbrowa, Gmina Zbąszyń =

Dąbrowa
- Settlement
- Location within Poland
- Coordinates: 52°13′01″N 15°51′29″E
- Country: Poland
- Voivodeship: Greater Poland
- County: Nowy Tomyśl
- Gmina: Zbąszyń

Dąbrowa [dɔmˈbrɔva] is a settlement in the administrative district of Gmina Zbąszyń, within Nowy Tomyśl County, Greater Poland Voivodeship, in west-central Poland.
