= Nowa Wieś Zbąska =

- Village
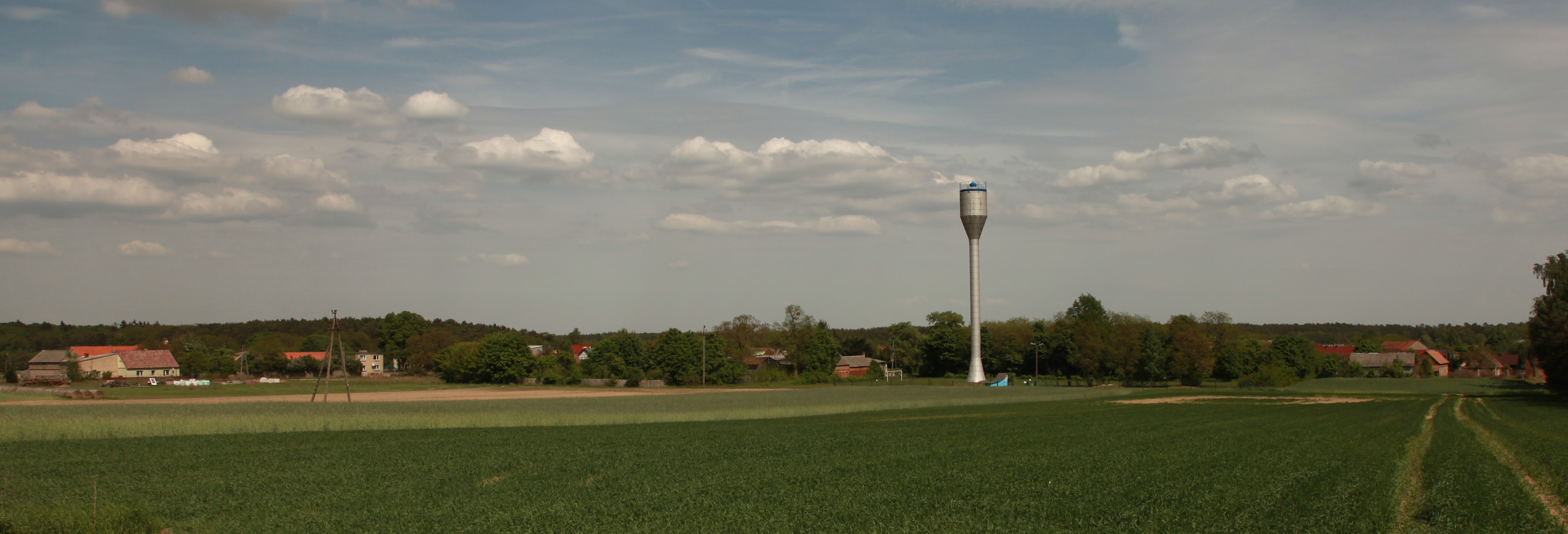
- Nowa Wieś Zbąska (2013)

- Location within Poland
- Coordinates: 52°11′51″N 15°53′10″E
- Country: Poland
- Voivodeship: Greater Poland
- County: Nowy Tomyśl
- Gmina: Zbąszyń

Nowa Wieś Zbąska [ˈnɔva ˈvjɛɕ ˈzbɔ̃ska] is a village in the administrative district of Gmina Zbąszyń, within Nowy Tomyśl County, Greater Poland Voivodeship, in west-central Poland.
