= Kopanki, Greater Poland Voivodeship =

Kopanki
- Village
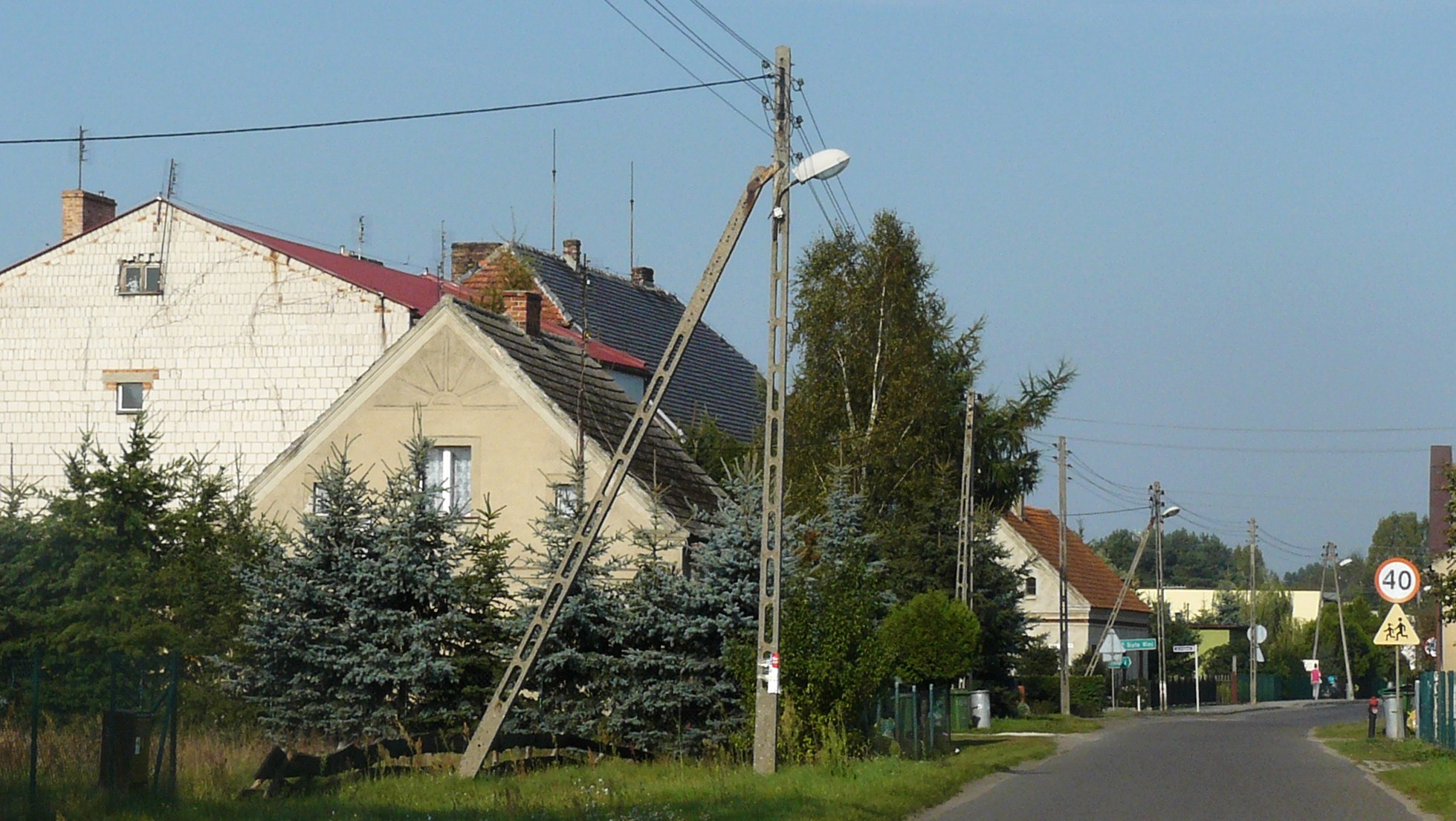
- A road in Kopanki

- Location within Poland
- Coordinates: 52°18′N 16°19′E
- Country: Poland
- Voivodeship: Greater Poland
- County: Nowy Tomyśl
- Gmina: Opalenica
- Population: 388

Kopanki [kɔˈpanki] is a village in the administrative district of Gmina Opalenica, within Nowy Tomyśl County, Greater Poland Voivodeship, in west-central Poland.
