= Leśne Domki =

- Settlement
- Location within Poland
- Coordinates: 52°14′42″N 15°57′42″E
- Country: Poland
- Voivodeship: Greater Poland
- County: Nowy Tomyśl
- Gmina: Zbąszyń

Leśne Domki [ˈlɛɕnɛ ˈdɔmki] is a settlement in the administrative district of Gmina Zbąszyń, within Nowy Tomyśl County, Greater Poland Voivodeship, in west-central Poland.
