= Uścięcice =

- Village
- Location within Poland
- Coordinates: 52°17′N 16°29′E
- Country: Poland
- Voivodeship: Greater Poland
- County: Nowy Tomyśl
- Gmina: Opalenica

Uścięcice [uɕt͡ɕɛnˈt͡ɕit͡sɛ] is a village in the administrative district of Gmina Opalenica, within Nowy Tomyśl County, Greater Poland Voivodeship, in west-central Poland.
