= Nowe Czeskie =

- Village
- Location within Poland
- Coordinates: 52°14′42″N 16°01′11″E
- Country: Poland
- Voivodeship: Greater Poland
- County: Nowy Tomyśl
- Gmina: Zbąszyń

Nowe Czeskie [ˈnɔvɛ ˈt͡ʂɛskʲɛ] is a village in the administrative district of Gmina Zbąszyń, within Nowy Tomyśl County, Greater Poland Voivodeship, in west-central Poland.
