= Wojnowice, Nowy Tomyśl County =

Wojnowice
- Village
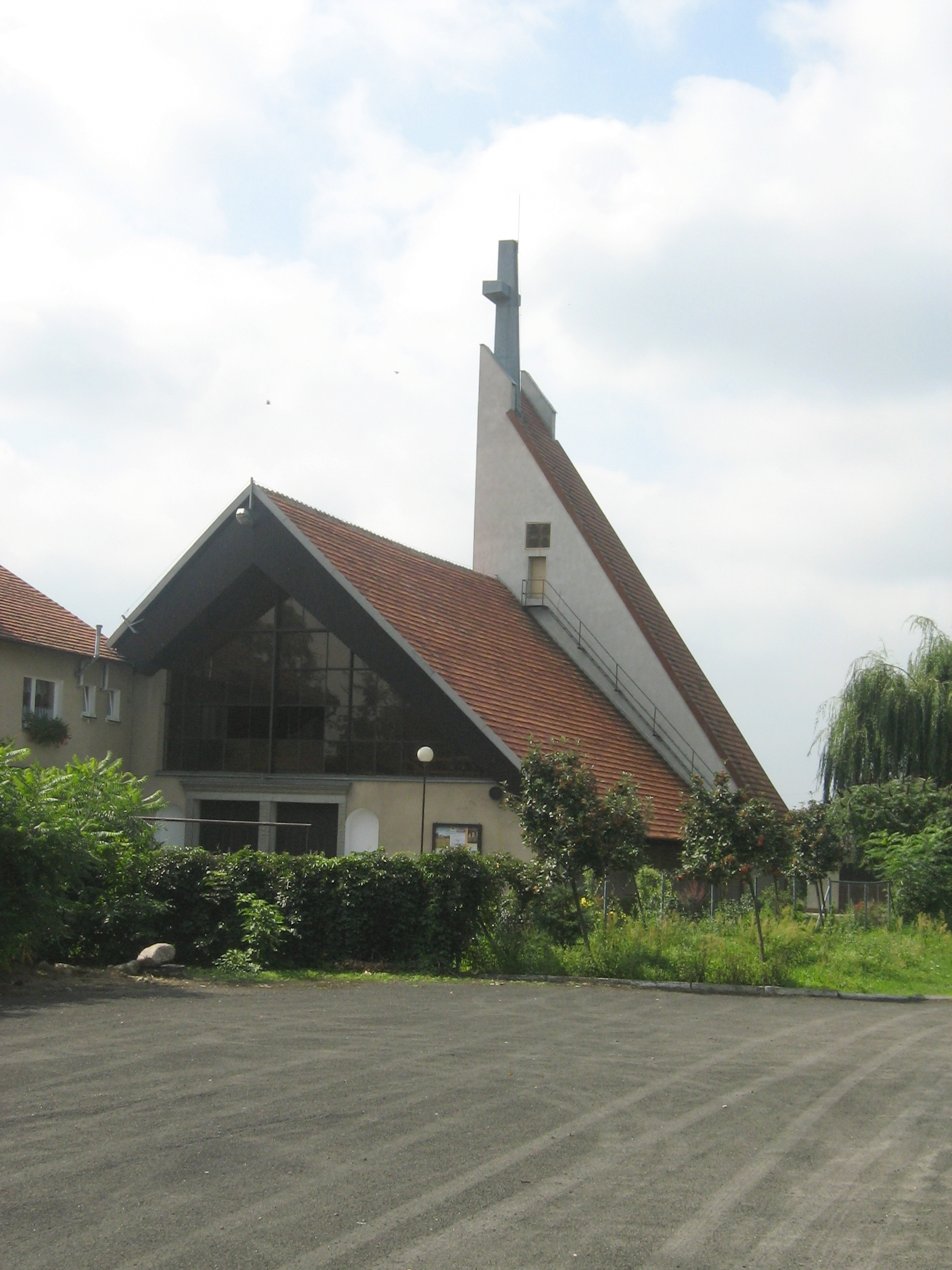
- A church in Wojnowice

- Location within Poland
- Coordinates: 52°20′N 16°28′E
- Country: Poland
- Voivodeship: Greater Poland
- County: Nowy Tomyśl
- Gmina: Opalenica

Population
  - Total: 1,064
- Time zone: UTC+1 (CET)
  - Summer (DST): UTC+2 (CEST)
- Vehicle registration: PNT

Wojnowice [vɔi̯nɔˈvit͡sɛ] is a village in the administrative district of Gmina Opalenica, within Nowy Tomyśl County, Greater Poland Voivodeship, in west-central Poland.

== History ==
Wojnowice was a private village of Polish nobility, including the Ostroróg and Raczyński families, administratively located in the Poznań County in the Poznań Voivodeship in the Greater Poland Province of the Kingdom of Poland.

Following the joint German-Soviet invasion of Poland, which started World War II in September 1939, the village was occupied by Germany until 1945. In 1940, the German gendarmerie carried out expulsions of Poles, who were deported to a transit camp in Łódź, while their houses were handed over to German colonists as part of the Lebensraum policy. On 21 January 1945, a German-perpetrated death march of prisoners of various nationalities from the dissolved camp in Żabikowo to the Sachsenhausen concentration camp passed through the village. Several prisoners attempted to escape.
