= Węgielnia, Greater Poland Voivodeship =

Węgielnia
- Village
- Location within Poland
- Coordinates: 52°25′N 16°4′E
- Country: Poland
- Voivodeship: Greater Poland
- County: Nowy Tomyśl
- Gmina: Miedzichowo

Węgielnia [vɛnˈɡʲɛlɲa] is a village in the administrative district of Gmina Miedzichowo, within Nowy Tomyśl County, Greater Poland Voivodeship, in west-central Poland.
