= Strzyżewo, Nowy Tomyśl County =

Strzyżewo
- Village
- Location within Poland
- Coordinates: 52°17′N 15°54′E
- Country: Poland
- Voivodeship: Greater Poland
- County: Nowy Tomyśl
- Gmina: Zbąszyń

Strzyżewo [stʂɨˈʐɛvɔ] is a village in the administrative district of Gmina Zbąszyń, within Nowy Tomyśl County, Greater Poland Voivodeship, in west-central Poland.
