= Nowe Jastrzębsko =

- Village
- Location within Poland
- Coordinates: 52°17′20″N 16°02′38″E
- Country: Poland
- Voivodeship: Greater Poland
- County: Nowy Tomyśl
- Gmina: Zbąszyń

Nowe Jastrzębsko [ˈnɔvɛ jasˈtʂɛmpskɔ] is a village in the administrative district of Gmina Zbąszyń, within Nowy Tomyśl County, Greater Poland Voivodeship, in west-central Poland.
