= Ernestynowo =

- Settlement
- Location within Poland
- Coordinates: 52°17′9″N 15°56′58″E
- Country: Poland
- Voivodeship: Greater Poland
- County: Nowy Tomyśl
- Gmina: Zbąszyń

Ernestynowo [ɛrnɛstɨˈnɔvɔ] is a settlement in the administrative district of Gmina Zbąszyń in Nowy Tomyśl County, Greater Poland Voivodeship, in west-central Poland.
