= Gmina Opalenica =

Gmina Opalenica Opalenica Commune
- Gmina
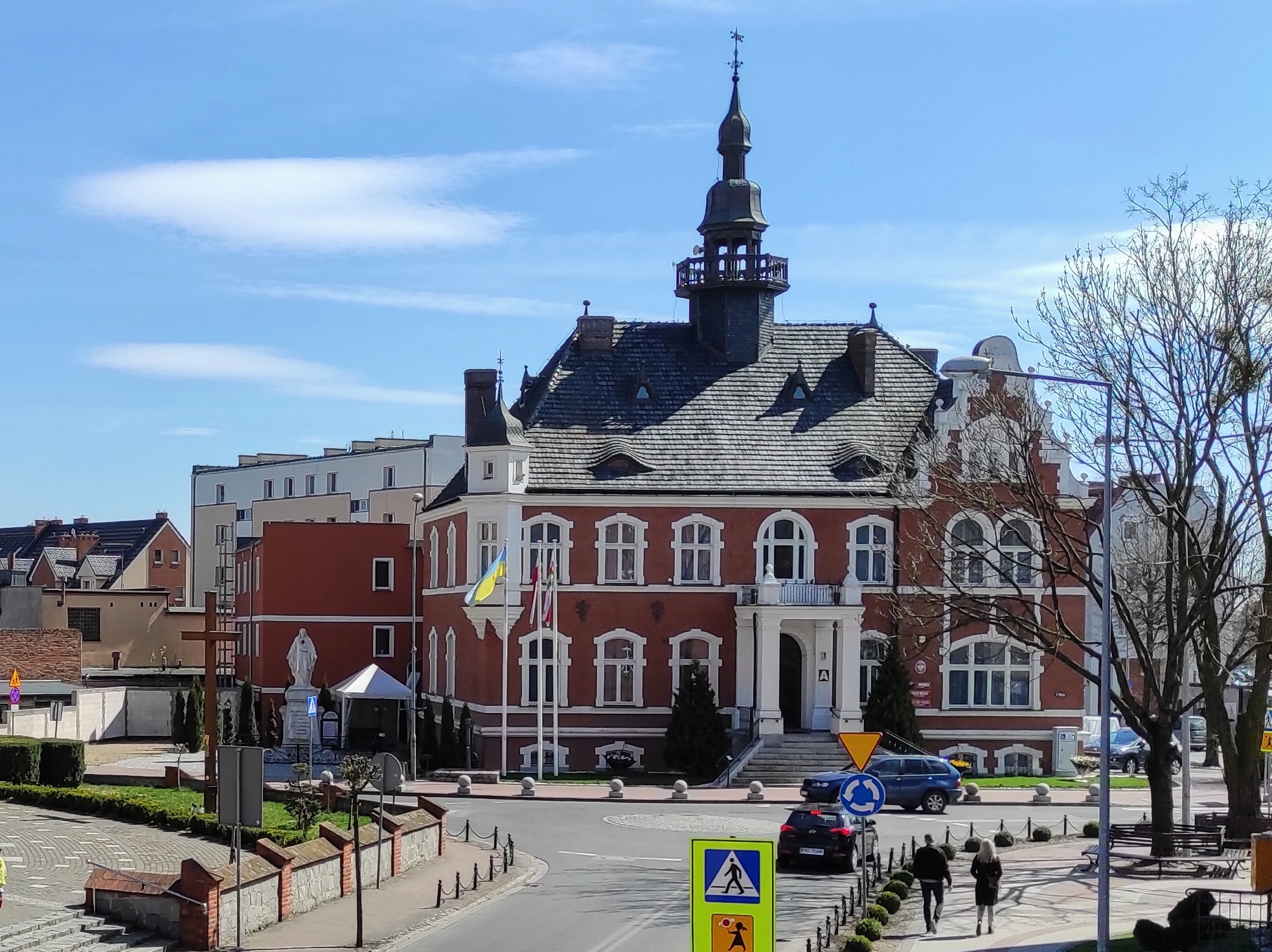
- Town Hall in Opalenica, seat of the gmina office

- Coat of arms
- Interactive map of Gmina Opalenica
- Coordinates (Opalenica): 52°18′28″N 16°24′49″E
- Country: Poland
- Voivodeship: Greater Poland
- County: Nowy Tomyśl
- Seat: Opalenica

Area
  - Total: 147.69 km^{2} (57.02 sq mi)

Population (2011)
  - Total: 16,098
  - Density: 109.00/km^{2} (282.31/sq mi)
  - Urban: 9,457
  - Rural: 6,641
- Time zone: UTC+1 (CET)
  - Summer (DST): UTC+2 (CEST)
- Vehicle registration: PNT
- Website: www.opalenica.pl/index.php

Gmina Opalenica is an urban-rural gmina (administrative district) in Nowy Tomyśl County, Greater Poland Voivodeship, in west-central Poland. Its seat is the town of Opalenica, which lies approximately 20 kilometres (12 mi) east of Nowy Tomyśl and 36 km (22 mi) west of the regional capital Poznań.

The gmina covers an area of 147.69 square kilometres (57.0 sq mi), and as of 2006 its total population is 15,588 (out of which the population of Opalenica amounts to 9,104, and the population of the rural part of the gmina is 6,484).

== Villages ==
Apart from the town of Opalenica, Gmina Opalenica contains the villages and settlements of Dakowy Mokre, Drapak, Jastrzębniki, Kopanki, Kozłowo, Łagwy, Łęczyce, Niegolewo, Porażyn, Porażyn-Dworzec, Porażyn-Ośrodek, Porażyn-Tartak, Rudniki, Sielinko, Sielinko-Osada, Stary Bukowiec, Terespotockie, Troszczyn, Urbanowo, Uścięcice and Wojnowice.

== Neighbouring gminas ==
Gmina Opalenica is bordered by the gminas of Buk, Duszniki, Granowo, Grodzisk Wielkopolski, Kuślin and Nowy Tomyśl.
