= Jastrzębsko Stare =

- Village
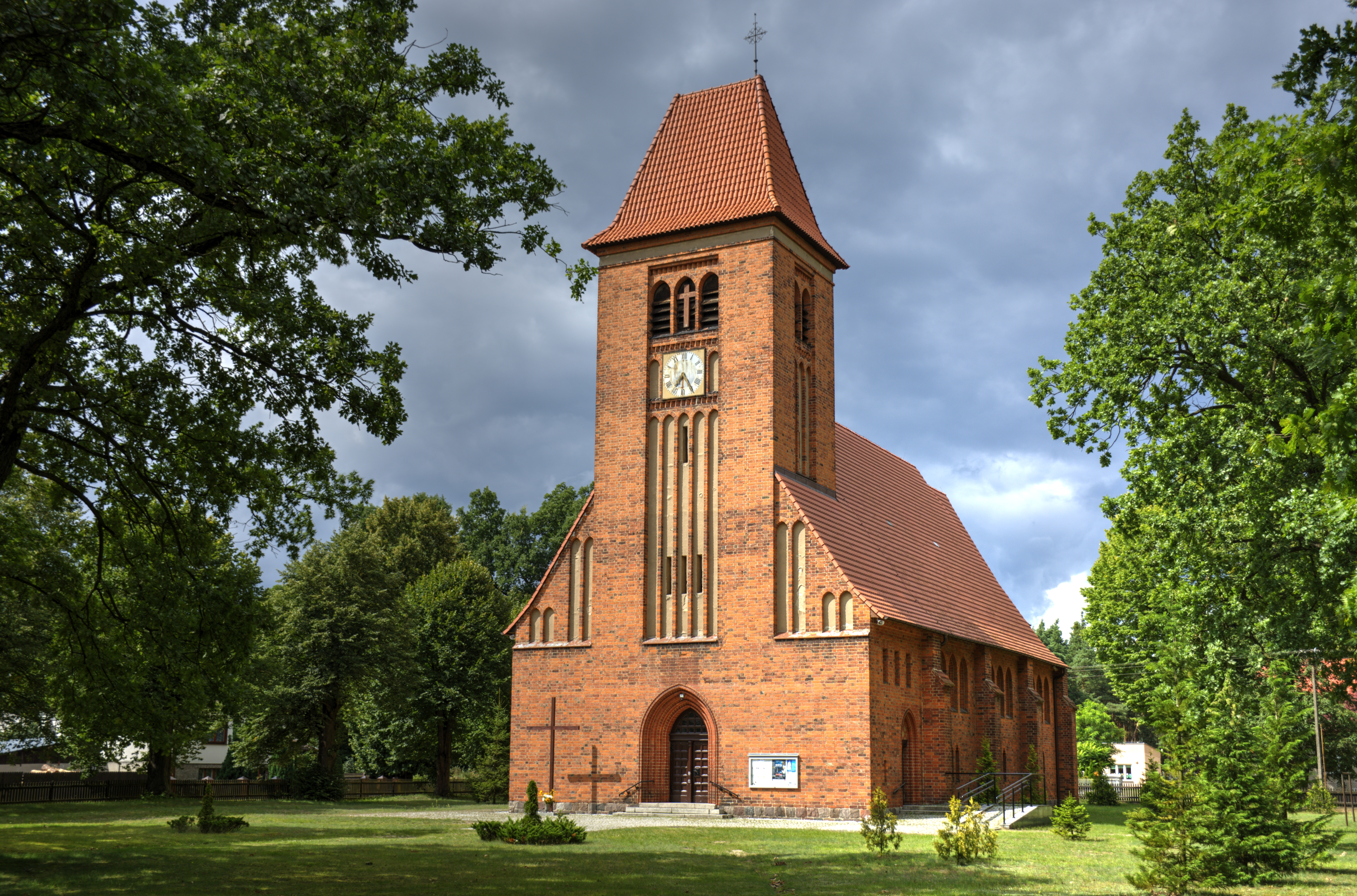
- Virgin Mary Queen of Poland church

- Location within Poland
- Coordinates: 52°18′N 16°4′E
- Country: Poland
- Voivodeship: Greater Poland
- County: Nowy Tomyśl
- Gmina: Nowy Tomyśl

Population
  - Total: 660
- Time zone: UTC+1 (CET)
  - Summer (DST): UTC+2 (CEST)
- Vehicle registration: PNT

Jastrzębsko Stare [jasˈtʂɛmpskɔ ˈstarɛ] is a village in the administrative district of Gmina Nowy Tomyśl, within Nowy Tomyśl County, Greater Poland Voivodeship, in west-central Poland.

== History ==
During World War II, in January 1945, a German-perpetrated death march of prisoners of various nationalities from the dissolved camp in Żabikowo to the Sachsenhausen concentration camp passed through the village.
