= Gmina Miedzichowo =

Gmina Miedzichowo Miedzichowo Commune
- Gmina
- Location within Poland
- Coordinates (Miedzichowo): 52°22′26″N 15°57′19″E
- Country: Poland
- Voivodeship: Greater Poland
- County: Nowy Tomyśl
- Seat: Miedzichowo

Area
  - Total: 208.51 km^{2} (80.51 sq mi)

Population (2011)
  - Total: 3,684
  - Density: 17.67/km^{2} (45.76/sq mi)
- Website: www.miedzichowo.pl

Gmina Miedzichowo is a rural gmina (administrative district) in Nowy Tomyśl County, Greater Poland Voivodeship, in west-central Poland. Its seat is the village of Miedzichowo, which lies approximately 14 kilometres (9 mi) north-west of Nowy Tomyśl and 66 km (41 mi) west of the regional capital Poznań.

The gmina covers an area of 208.51 square kilometres (80.5 sq mi), and as of 2006 its total population is 3,801.

The gmina contains part of the protected area called Pszczew Landscape Park.

== Villages ==
Gmina Miedzichowo contains the villages and settlements of Błaki, Bolewice, Bolewicko, Grudna, Jabłonka Stara, Łęczno, Lewiczynek, Lubień, Miedzichowo, Nowa Silna, Pąchy, Piotry, Prądówka, Sępolno, Stary Folwark, Szklarka Trzcielska, Toczeń, Trzciel-Odbudowa, Węgielnia, Zachodzko and Zawada.

== Neighbouring gminas ==
Gmina Miedzichowo is bordered by the gminas of Lwówek, Międzychód, Nowy Tomyśl, Pszczew, Trzciel and Zbąszyń.
