= Stary Tomyśl =

- Village
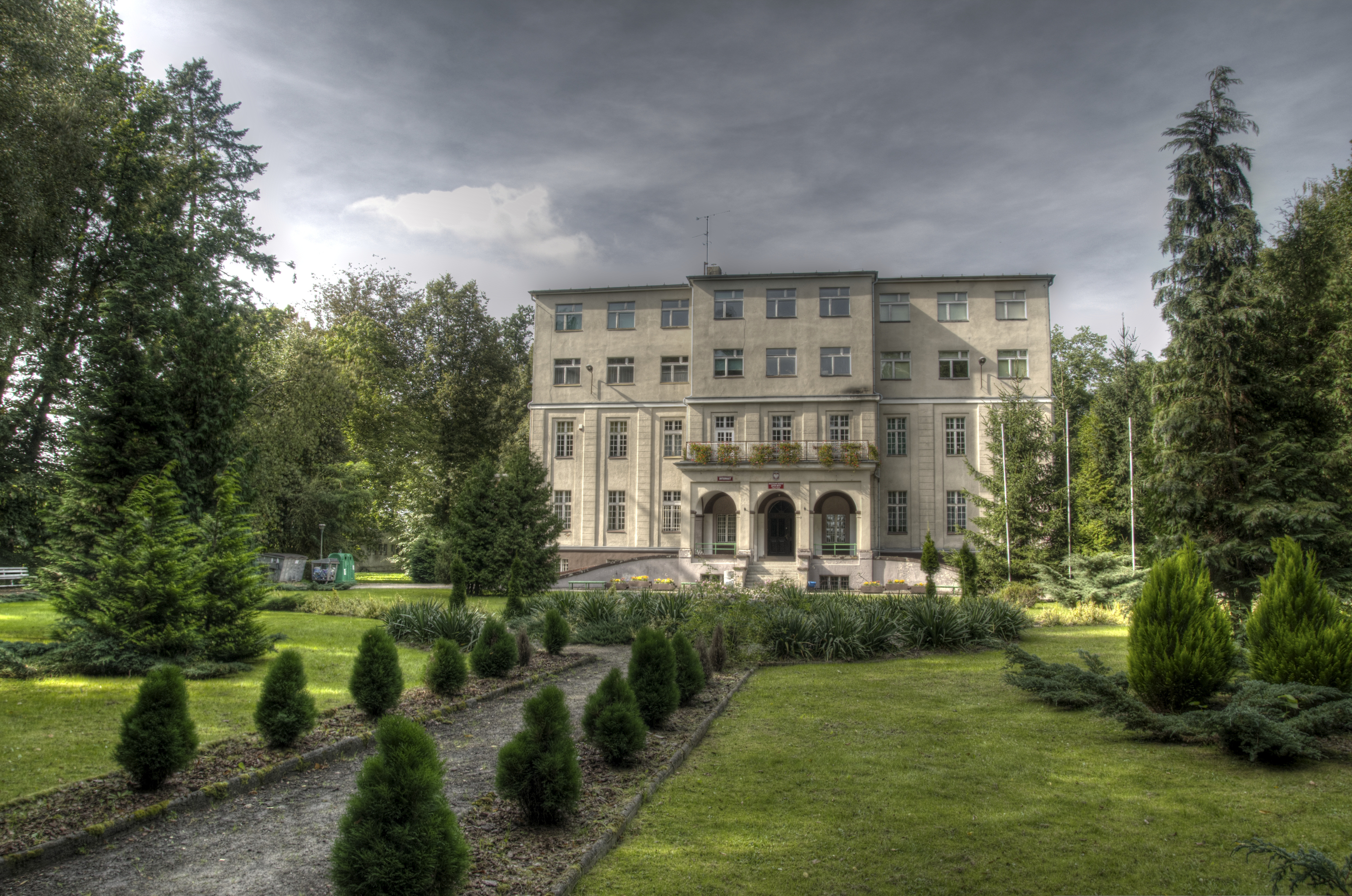
- Manor in Stary Tomyśl

- Location within Poland
- Coordinates: 52°21′N 16°10′E
- Country: Poland
- Voivodeship: Greater Poland
- County: Nowy Tomyśl
- Gmina: Nowy Tomyśl
- Population: 580

Stary Tomyśl [ˈstarɨ ˈtɔmɨɕl] is a village in the administrative district of Gmina Nowy Tomyśl, within Nowy Tomyśl County, Greater Poland Voivodeship, in west-central Poland.
