= Cicha Góra =

- Village
- Location within Poland
- Coordinates: 52°18′N 16°12′E
- Country: Poland
- Voivodeship: Greater Poland
- County: Nowy Tomyśl
- Gmina: Nowy Tomyśl
- Population: 390

Cicha Góra [ˈt͡ɕixa ˈɡura] is a village in the administrative district of Gmina Nowy Tomyśl, within Nowy Tomyśl County, Greater Poland Voivodeship, in west-central Poland.
