= Sielinko =

- Village
- Location within Poland
- Coordinates: 52°17′35″N 16°23′19″E
- Country: Poland
- Voivodeship: Greater Poland
- County: Nowy Tomyśl
- Gmina: Opalenica

Sielinko [ɕɛˈlinkɔ] is a village in the administrative district of Gmina Opalenica, within Nowy Tomyśl County, Greater Poland Voivodeship, in west-central Poland.

Sielinko has a Museum of Meat Production, once of the branches of the National Museum of Agriculture in Szreniawa.
