= Edmundowo =

- Settlement
- Location within Poland
- Coordinates: 52°12′13″N 15°55′53″E
- Country: Poland
- Voivodeship: Greater Poland
- County: Nowy Tomyśl
- Gmina: Zbąszyń

Edmundowo [ɛdmunˈdɔvɔ] is a settlement in the administrative district of Gmina Zbąszyń, within Nowy Tomyśl County, Greater Poland Voivodeship, in west-central Poland.
