= Porażyn-Dworzec =

Porażyn-Tartak
- Village
- Location within Poland
- Coordinates: 52°18′10″N 16°17′17″E
- Country: Poland
- Voivodeship: Greater Poland
- County: Nowy Tomyśl
- Gmina: Opalenica
- Population: 194

Porażyn-Dworzec [pɔˈraʐɨn ˈdvɔʐɛt͡s] is a village in the administrative district of Gmina Opalenica, within Nowy Tomyśl County, Greater Poland Voivodeship, in west-central Poland.
