= Stefanowice =

Stefanowice may refer to the following places in Poland:

- Stefanowice, Lower Silesian Voivodeship (south-west Poland)
- Stefanowice, Greater Poland Voivodeship (west-central Poland)
