= Grudna, Nowy Tomyśl County =

Grudna
- Village
- Location within Poland
- Coordinates: 52°25′15″N 16°4′32″E
- Country: Poland
- Voivodeship: Greater Poland
- County: Nowy Tomyśl
- Gmina: Miedzichowo
- Elevation: 76 m (249 ft)
- Population: 220
- Website: http://www.grudna.pl

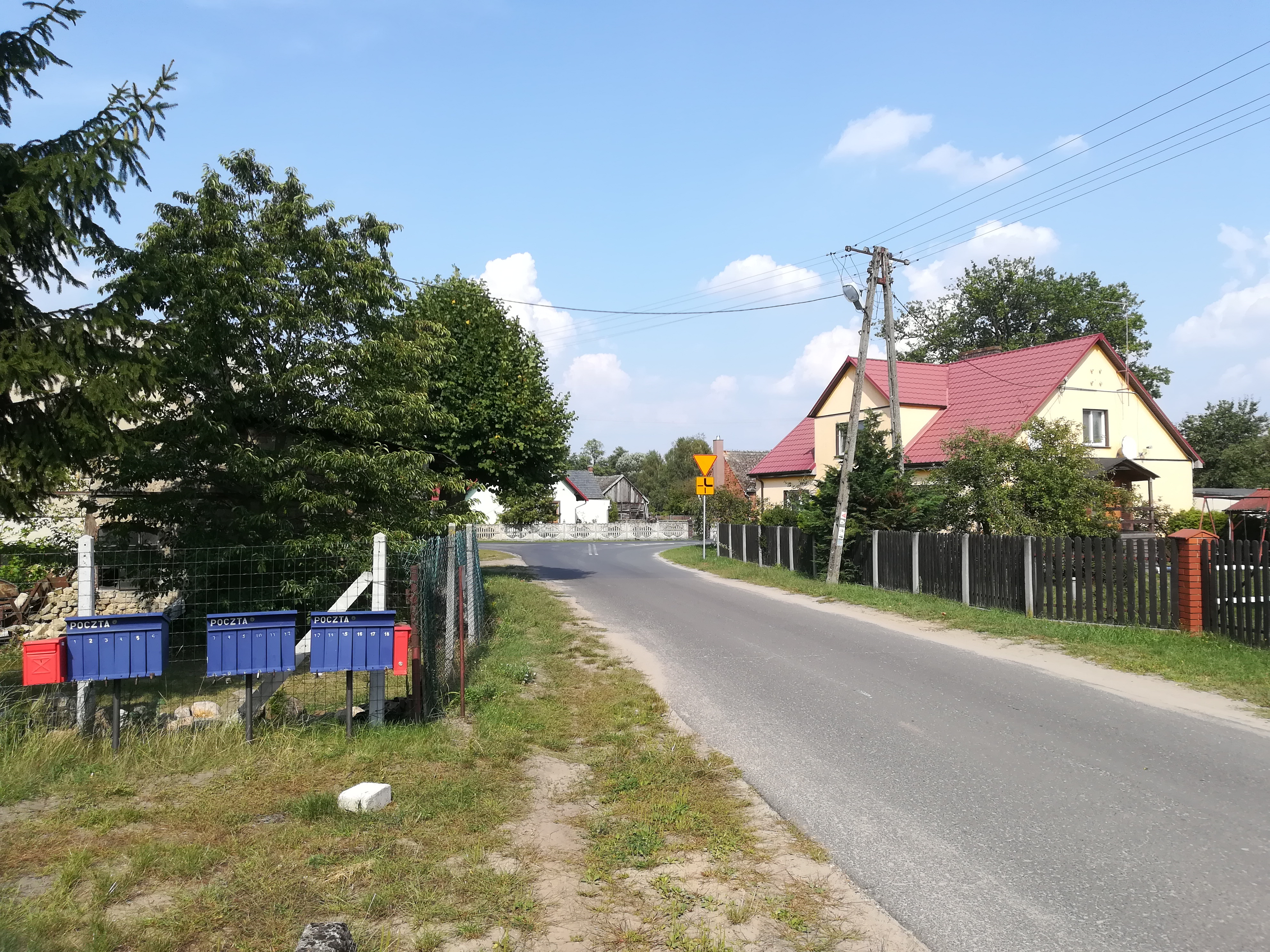
Grudna, Nowy Tomyśl County

Grudna [ˈɡrudna] is a village in the administrative district of Gmina Miedzichowo, within Nowy Tomyśl County, Greater Poland Voivodeship, in west-central Poland.

== Notable residents ==
- Armin Thiede (1917–1943), Wehrmacht officer
