= Stary Bukowiec, Greater Poland Voivodeship =

Stary Bukowiec
- Village
- Location within Poland
- Coordinates: 52°18′17″N 16°17′20″E
- Country: Poland
- Voivodeship: Greater Poland
- County: Nowy Tomyśl
- Gmina: Opalenica

Stary Bukowiec [ˈstarɨ buˈkɔvjɛt͡s] is a village in the administrative district of Gmina Opalenica, within Nowy Tomyśl County, Greater Poland Voivodeship, in west-central Poland.
