= Rudniki, Greater Poland Voivodeship =

Rudniki
- Village
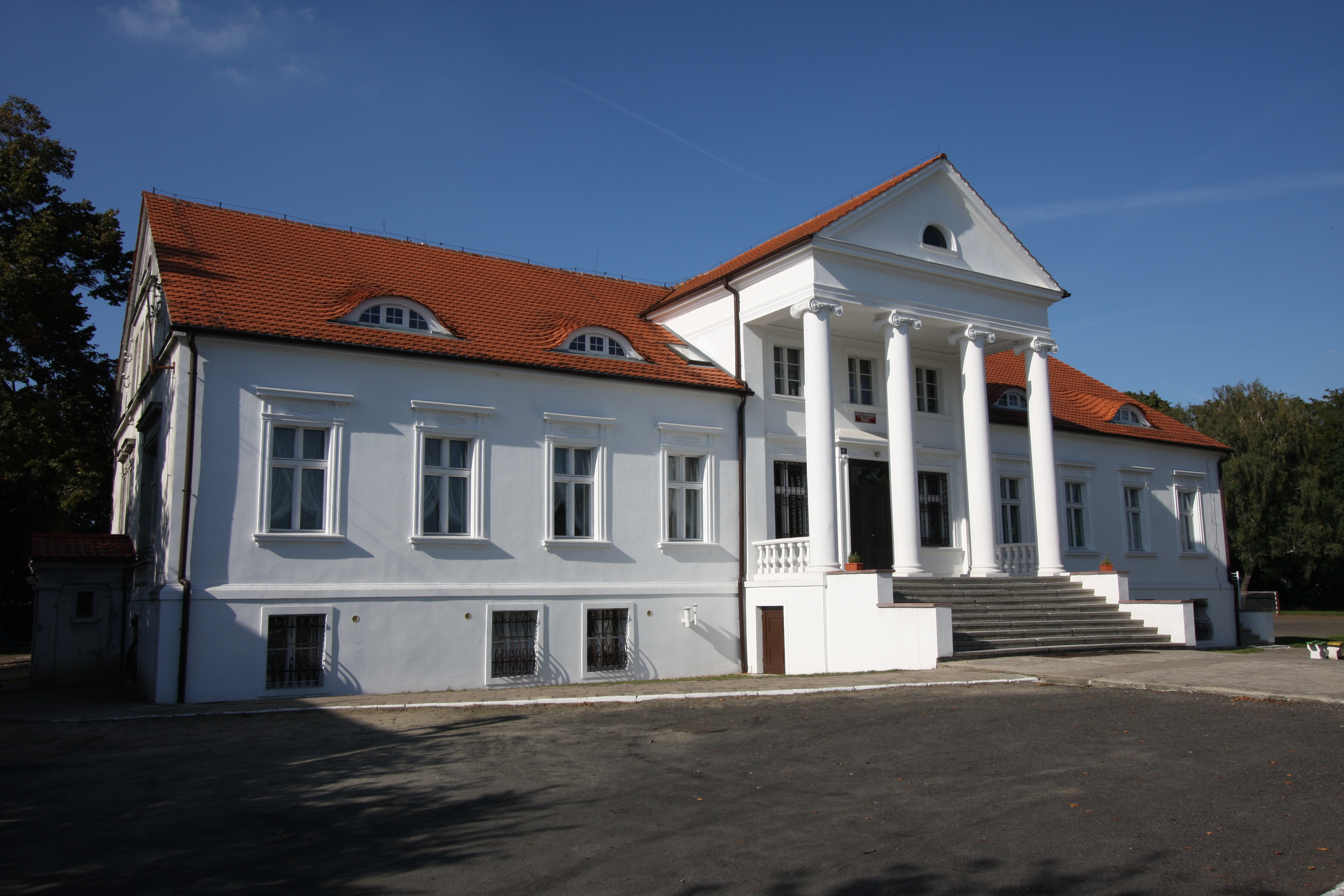
- Old manor in Rudniki

- Location within Poland
- Coordinates: 52°21′N 16°25′E
- Country: Poland
- Voivodeship: Greater Poland
- County: Nowy Tomyśl
- Gmina: Opalenica
- Time zone: UTC+1 (CET)
  - Summer (DST): UTC+2 (CEST)
- Vehicle registration: PNT

Rudniki [rudˈniki] is a village in the administrative district of Gmina Opalenica, within Nowy Tomyśl County, Greater Poland Voivodeship, in west-central Poland.

Historical population
Year	Pop.	±%
1837	414	—
1921	524	+26.6%
