= Piaski, Nowy Tomyśl County =

Piaski
- Settlement
- Location within Poland
- Coordinates: 52°16′31″N 15°53′2″E
- Country: Poland
- Voivodeship: Greater Poland
- County: Nowy Tomyśl
- Gmina: Zbąszyń

Piaski (Polish pronunciation: [ˈpjaskʲi]) is a settlement in the administrative district of Gmina Zbąszyń, within Nowy Tomyśl County, Greater Poland Voivodeship, in west-central Poland.
