= Nądnia =

- Village
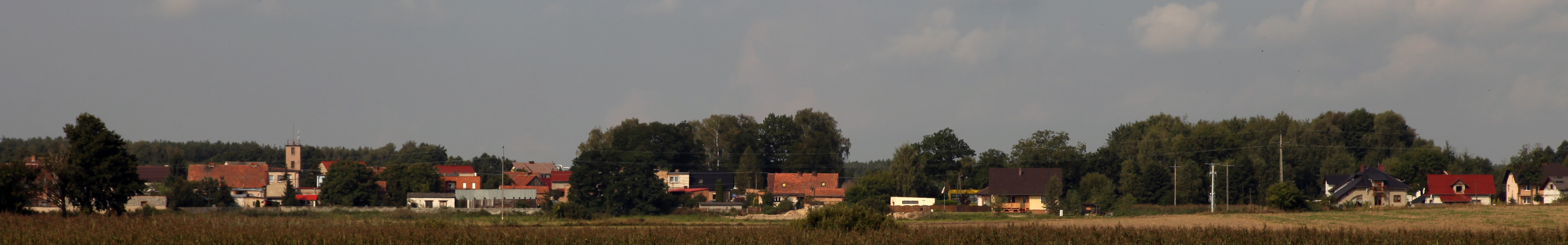
- Nądnia (2012)

- Location within Poland
- Coordinates: 52°14′N 15°52′E
- Country: Poland
- Voivodeship: Greater Poland
- County: Nowy Tomyśl
- Gmina: Zbąszyń
- Population: 723

Nądnia [ˈnɔndɲa] is a village in the administrative district of Gmina Zbąszyń, within Nowy Tomyśl County, Greater Poland Voivodeship, in west-central Poland.
