= Przyłęk, Greater Poland Voivodeship =

Przyłęk
- Village
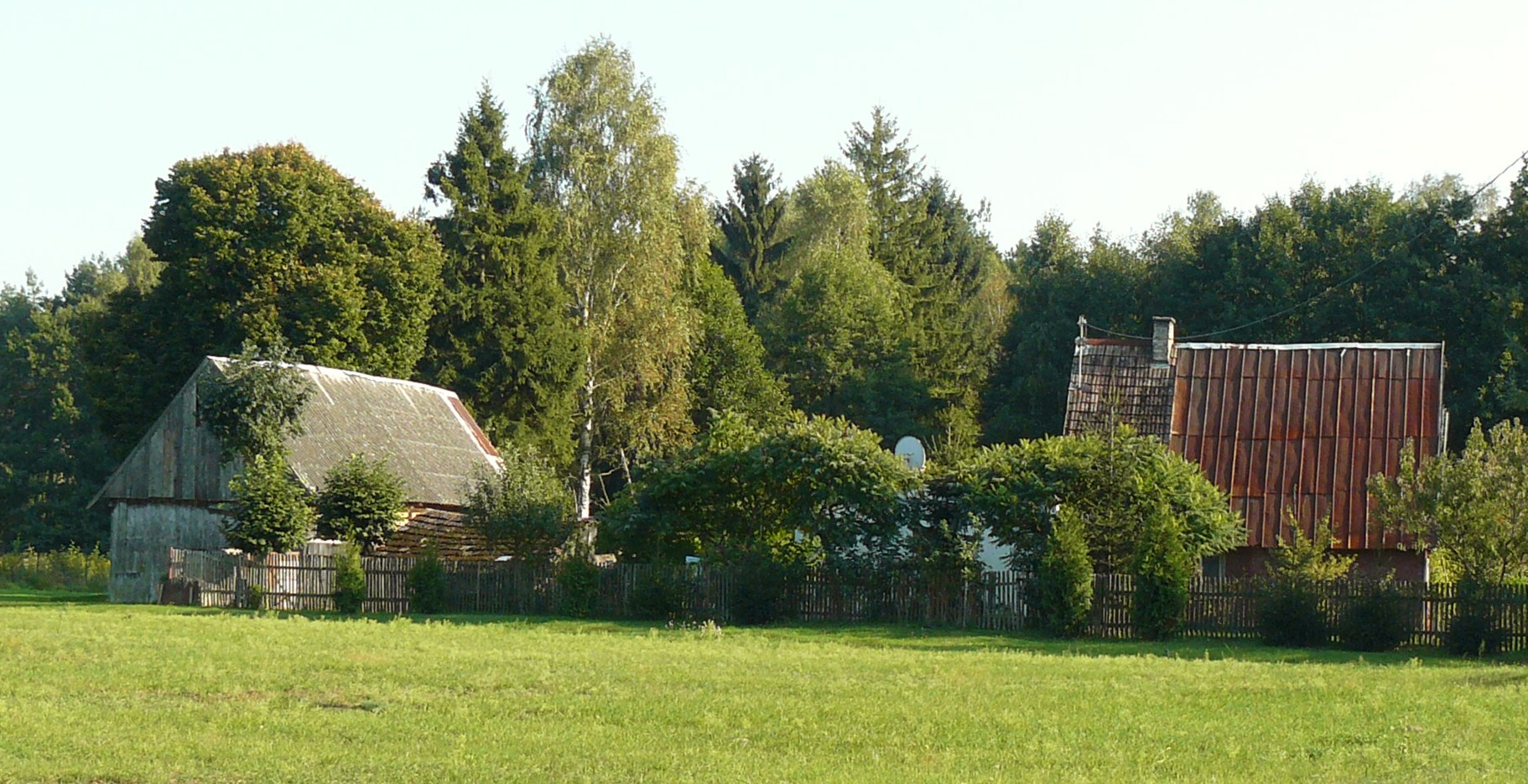
- Farm outside Przyłęk with a satellite dish

- Location within Poland
- Coordinates: 52°20′N 16°7′E
- Country: Poland
- Voivodeship: Greater Poland
- County: Nowy Tomyśl
- Gmina: Nowy Tomyśl
- Population: 546

Przyłęk [ˈpʂɨwɛnk] is a village in the administrative district of Gmina Nowy Tomyśl, within Nowy Tomyśl County, Greater Poland Voivodeship, in west-central Poland.

== World War II history ==
From 1940 to 1943, Przyłęk was the location of a Nazi German forced labour camp called Smolarnia for Jews and Poles enslaved in the construction of military highway from Berlin to Poznań passing through on the outskirts of the village (pl). Many of the 3,500 prisoners died there from disease, hunger and physical exhaustion. A monument to their memory was erected in 1979.

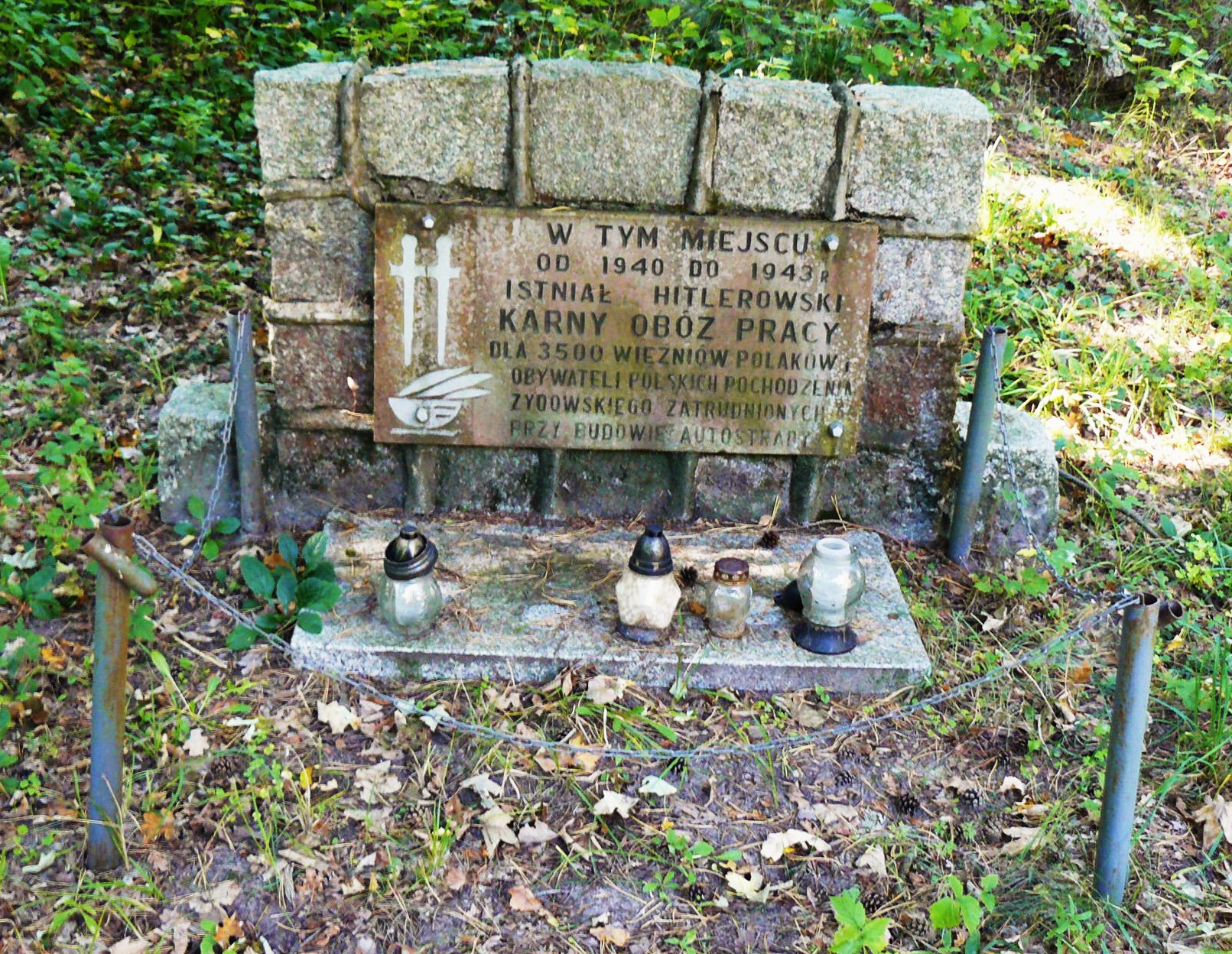
Monument commemorating the camp victims.
