= Stefanowo, Nowy Tomyśl County =

Stefanowo
- Village
- Location within Poland
- Coordinates: 52°13′58″N 15°58′16″E
- Country: Poland
- Voivodeship: Greater Poland
- County: Nowy Tomyśl
- Gmina: Zbąszyń

Stefanowo [stɛfaˈnɔvɔ] is a village in the administrative district of Gmina Zbąszyń, within Nowy Tomyśl County, Greater Poland Voivodeship, in west-central Poland.
