= Sękowo, Nowy Tomyśl County =

Sękowo
- Village
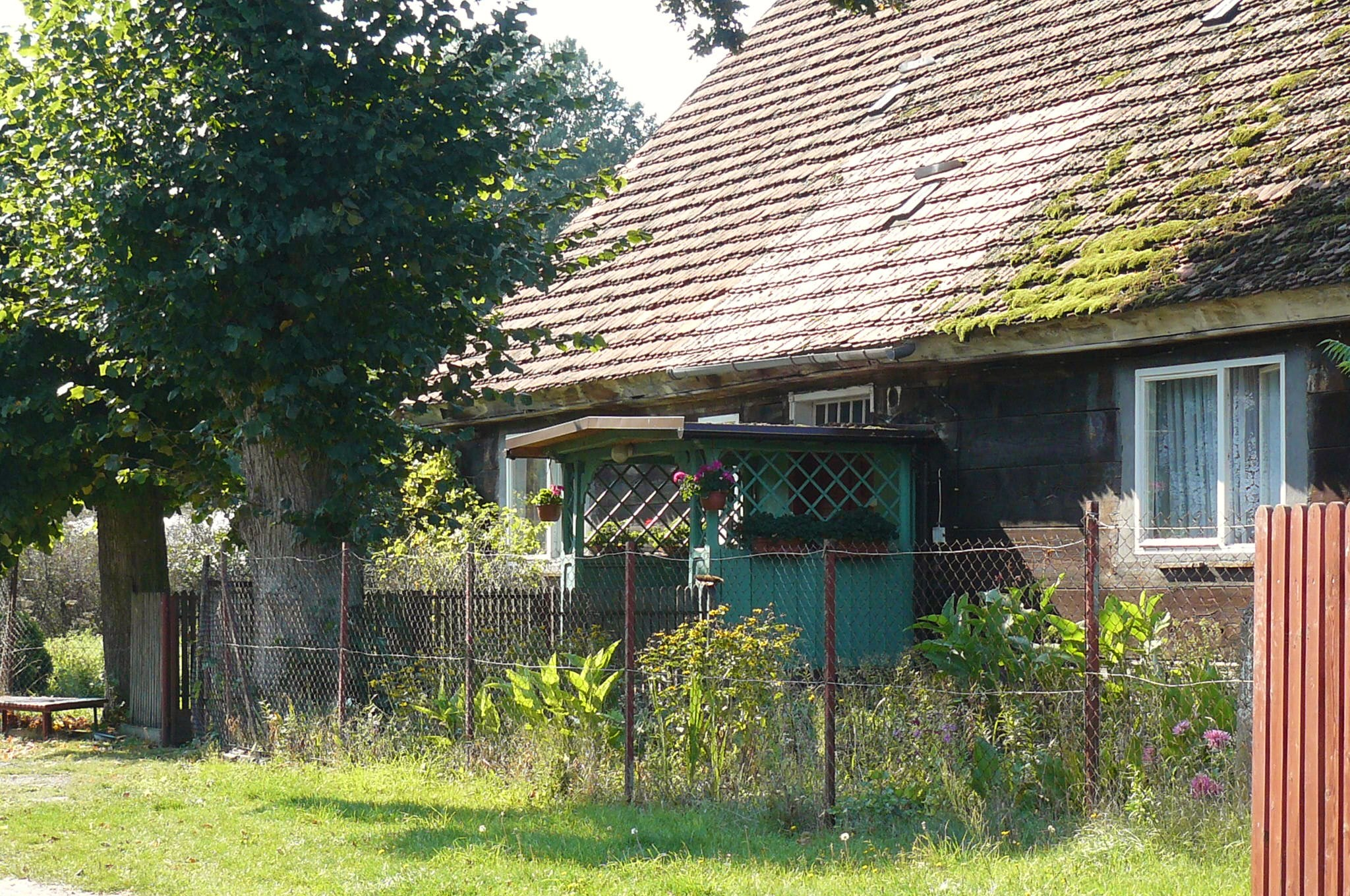

- Location within Poland
- Coordinates: 52°18′13″N 16°05′15″E
- Country: Poland
- Voivodeship: Greater Poland
- County: Nowy Tomyśl
- Gmina: Nowy Tomyśl

Population
  - Total: 398
- Time zone: UTC+1 (CET)
  - Summer (DST): UTC+2 (CEST)
- Vehicle registration: PNT

Sękowo [sɛnˈkɔvɔ] is a village in the administrative district of Gmina Nowy Tomyśl, within Nowy Tomyśl County, Greater Poland Voivodeship, in west-central Poland.

== History ==
Following the joint German-Soviet invasion of Poland, which started World War II in September 1939, the town was occupied by Germany until 1945. In December 1939, the German gendarmerie carried out the first expulsions of Poles, including families of intelligentsia, activists and owners of workshops, bakeries and restaurants, which were then handed over to German colonists as part of the Lebensraum policy. Expelled Poles were deported to a transit camp in Młyniewo, and then to the Radom District in the more-eastern part of German-occupied Poland. In January 1945, a German-perpetrated death march of prisoners of various nationalities from the dissolved camp in Żabikowo to the Sachsenhausen concentration camp passed through the village.
