= Toczeń =

Toczeń may refer to the following places in Poland:

- Toczeń, Greater Poland Voivodeship (west-central Poland)
- Toczeń, Pomeranian Voivodeship (north Poland)
