= Nowy Dwór, Nowy Tomyśl County =

Nowy Dwór
- Village
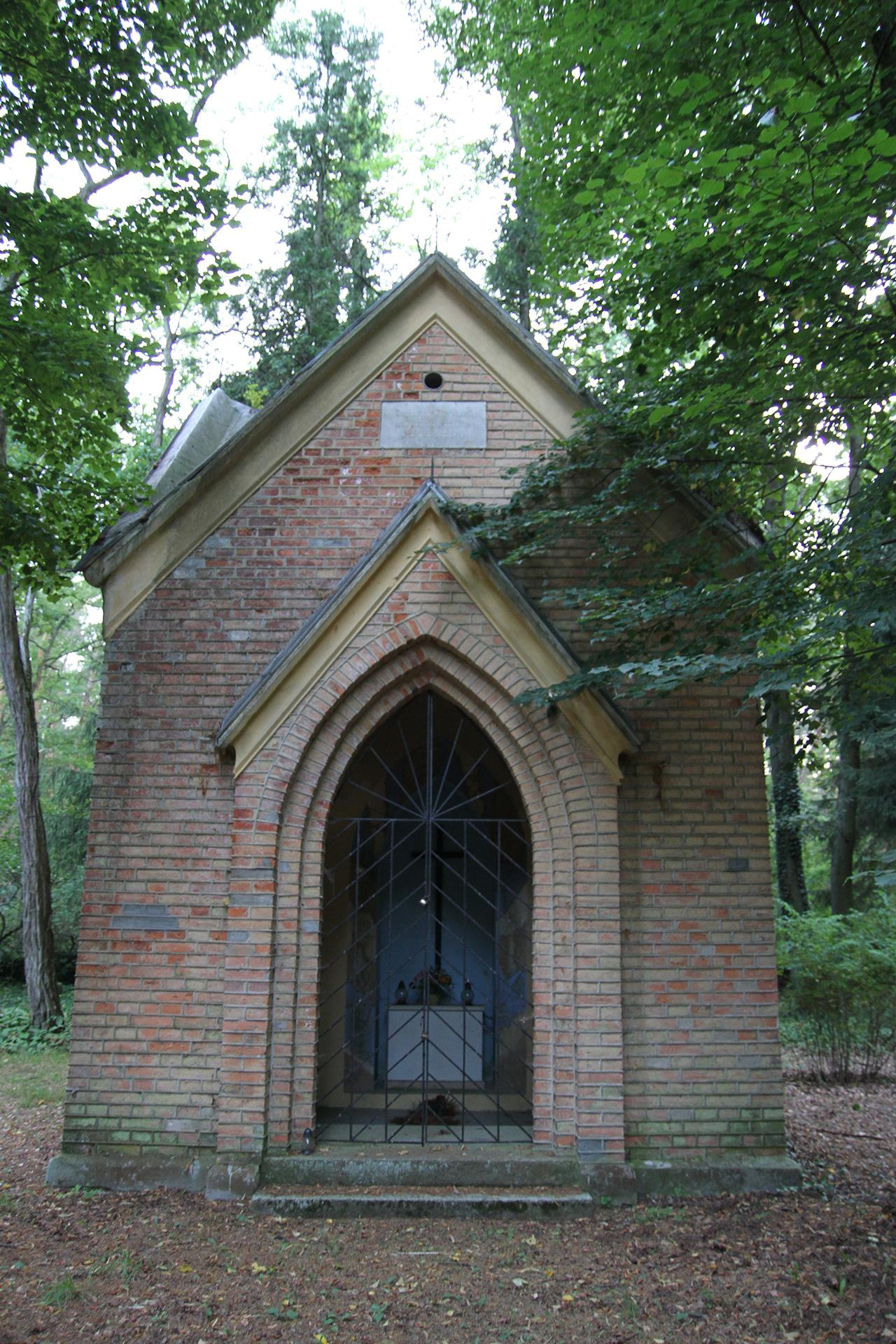
- Chapel at the Evangelical Cemetery, Nowy Dwór, Nowy Tomyśl County

- Location within Poland
- Coordinates: 52°15′48″N 15°55′57″E
- Country: Poland
- Voivodeship: Greater Poland
- County: Nowy Tomyśl
- Gmina: Zbąszyń

Nowy Dwór [ˈnɔvɨ ˈdvur] is a village in the administrative district of Gmina Zbąszyń, within Nowy Tomyśl County, Greater Poland Voivodeship, in west-central Poland.
