= Stary Folwark, Greater Poland Voivodeship =

Stary Folwark
- Village
- Location within Poland
- Coordinates: 52°22′N 15°54′E
- Country: Poland
- Voivodeship: Greater Poland
- County: Nowy Tomyśl
- Gmina: Miedzichowo
- Population: 120

Stary Folwark [ˈstarɨ ˈfɔlvark] is a village in the administrative district of Gmina Miedzichowo, within Nowy Tomyśl County, Greater Poland Voivodeship, in west-central Poland.
