= Chrośnica =

Chrośnica may refer to the following places in Poland:

- Chrośnica, Lower Silesian Voivodeship (south-west Poland)
- Chrośnica, Greater Poland Voivodeship (west-central Poland)
