= Kopce =

Kopce may refer to the following places:

- Kopce, Kuyavian-Pomeranian Voivodeship (north-central Poland)
- Kopce, Lublin Voivodeship (east Poland)
- Kopce, Podlaskie Voivodeship (north-east Poland)
- Kopce, Masovian Voivodeship (east-central Poland)
- Kopce, Greater Poland Voivodeship (west-central Poland)
