= Czerwony Dwór =

Czerwony Dwór (meaning "red manor") may refer to:

- Polish name for Raudondvaris in Lithuania
- Czerwony Dwór, Greater Poland Voivodeship (west-central Poland)
- Czerwony Dwór, Pomeranian Voivodeship (north Poland)
- Czerwony Dwór, Olecko County in Warmian-Masurian Voivodeship (north Poland)
- Czerwony Dwór, Węgorzewo County in Warmian-Masurian Voivodeship (north Poland)
