= Łęczyce, Greater Poland Voivodeship =

Łęczyce
- Village
- Location within Poland
- Coordinates: 52°19′15″N 16°22′59″E
- Country: Poland
- Voivodeship: Greater Poland
- County: Nowy Tomyśl
- Gmina: Opalenica

Łęczyce [wɛnˈt͡ʂɨt͡sɛ] is a village in the administrative district of Gmina Opalenica, within Nowy Tomyśl County, Greater Poland Voivodeship, in west-central Poland.
