= Urbanowo, Greater Poland Voivodeship =

Urbanowo
- Village
- Location within Poland
- Coordinates: 52°16′N 16°24′E
- Country: Poland
- Voivodeship: Greater Poland
- County: Nowy Tomyśl
- Gmina: Opalenica

Urbanowo [urbaˈnɔvɔ] is a village in the administrative district of Gmina Opalenica, within Nowy Tomyśl County, Greater Poland Voivodeship, in west-central Poland.
