= Nowa Silna =

- Village
- Location within Poland
- Coordinates: 52°26′18″N 15°49′23″E
- Country: Poland
- Voivodeship: Greater Poland
- County: Nowy Tomyśl
- Gmina: Miedzichowo

Nowa Silna [ˈnɔva ˈɕilna] is a village in the administrative district of Gmina Miedzichowo, within Nowy Tomyśl County, Greater Poland Voivodeship, in west-central Poland.
