= Wytomyśl =

- Village
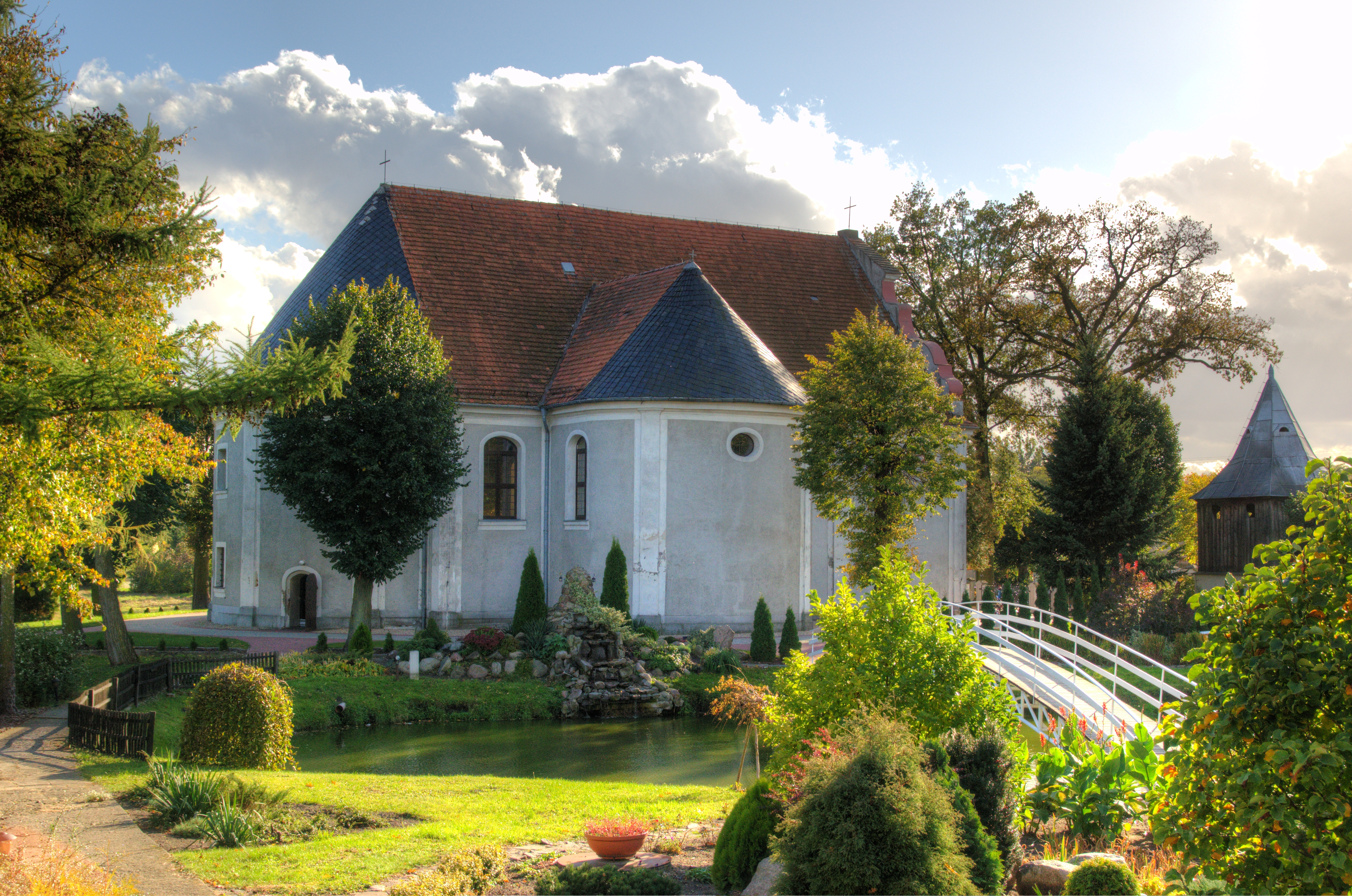
- Saint Archangel Michael Church

- Location within Poland
- Coordinates: 52°23′N 16°11′E
- Country: Poland
- Voivodeship: Greater Poland
- County: Nowy Tomyśl
- Gmina: Nowy Tomyśl
- Population: 512

Wytomyśl [vɨˈtɔmɨɕl] is a village in the administrative district of Gmina Nowy Tomyśl, within Nowy Tomyśl County, Greater Poland Voivodeship, in west-central Poland.
