= Łęczno =

Łęczno may refer to the following places:

- Łęczno, Greater Poland Voivodeship (west-central Poland)
- Łęczno, Łódź Voivodeship (central Poland)
- Łęczno, West Pomeranian Voivodeship (north-west Poland)
