= Nowa Wieś-Zamek =

- Village
- Location within Poland
- Coordinates: 52°12′38″N 15°53′25″E
- Country: Poland
- Voivodeship: Greater Poland
- County: Nowy Tomyśl
- Gmina: Zbąszyń
- Population: 180

Nowa Wieś-Zamek [ˈnɔva ˈvjɛɕ ˈzamɛk] is a village in the administrative district of Gmina Zbąszyń, within Nowy Tomyśl County, Greater Poland Voivodeship, in west-central Poland.
