= Glinno =

Glinno may refer to the following places in Poland:

- Glinno, Lower Silesian Voivodeship (south-west Poland)
- Glinno, Łódź Voivodeship (central Poland)
- Glinno, Nowy Tomyśl County in Greater Poland Voivodeship (west-central Poland)
- Glinno, Poznań County in Greater Poland Voivodeship (west-central Poland)
- Glinno, Wągrowiec County in Greater Poland Voivodeship (west-central Poland)
- Glinno, Pomeranian Voivodeship (north Poland)
- Glinno, West Pomeranian Voivodeship (north-west Poland)
