= Prądówka =

- Village
- Location within Poland
- Coordinates: 52°20′N 15°54′E
- Country: Poland
- Voivodeship: Greater Poland
- County: Nowy Tomyśl
- Gmina: Miedzichowo

Prądówka [prɔnˈdufka] is a village in the administrative district of Gmina Miedzichowo, within Nowy Tomyśl County, Greater Poland Voivodeship, in west-central Poland.

Prądówka has a population of about 99 people according to the 2021 census.
