= Troszczyn =

- Village
- Location within Poland
- Coordinates: 52°17′N 16°26′E
- Country: Poland
- Voivodeship: Greater Poland
- County: Nowy Tomyśl
- Gmina: Opalenica
- Time zone: UTC+1 (CET)
  - Summer (DST): UTC+2 (CEST)
- Vehicle registration: PNT

Troszczyn [ˈtrɔʂt͡ʂɨn] is a village in the administrative district of Gmina Opalenica, within Nowy Tomyśl County, Greater Poland Voivodeship, in west-central Poland.

Historical population
Year	Pop.	±%
1837	173	—
1921	228	+31.8%
