= Szarki =

Szarki may refer to the following places:

- Szarki, Greater Poland Voivodeship (west-central Poland)
- Szarki, Lubusz Voivodeship (west Poland)
- Szarki, Silesian Voivodeship (south Poland)
- Szarki, Warmian-Masurian Voivodeship (north Poland)
