= Kozie Laski =

- Village
- Location within Poland
- Coordinates: 52°21′44″N 16°10′19″E
- Country: Poland
- Voivodeship: Greater Poland
- County: Nowy Tomyśl
- Gmina: Nowy Tomyśl
- Population: 183

Kozie Laski (Polish pronunciation: [ˈkɔʑɛ ˈlaskʲi]) is a village in the administrative district of Gmina Nowy Tomyśl, within Nowy Tomyśl County, Greater Poland Voivodeship, in west-central Poland.
