= Łagwy =

- Miejscowość
- Location within Poland
- Coordinates: 52°20′54″N 16°27′6″E
- Country: Poland
- Voivodeship: Greater Poland
- County: Nowy Tomyśl
- Gmina: Opalenica

Łagwy [ˈwaɡvɨ] is a village in the administrative district of Gmina Opalenica, within Nowy Tomyśl County, Greater Poland Voivodeship, in west-central Poland.
