= Bukowiec, Nowy Tomyśl County =

Bukowiec
- Village
- Location within Poland
- Coordinates: 52°17′36″N 16°14′48″E
- Country: Poland
- Voivodeship: Greater Poland
- County: Nowy Tomyśl
- Gmina: Nowy Tomyśl
- Population: 1,020

Bukowiec [buˈkɔvjɛt͡s] is a village in the administrative district of Gmina Nowy Tomyśl, within Nowy Tomyśl County, Greater Poland Voivodeship, in west-central Poland.
