= Niegolewo =

- Village
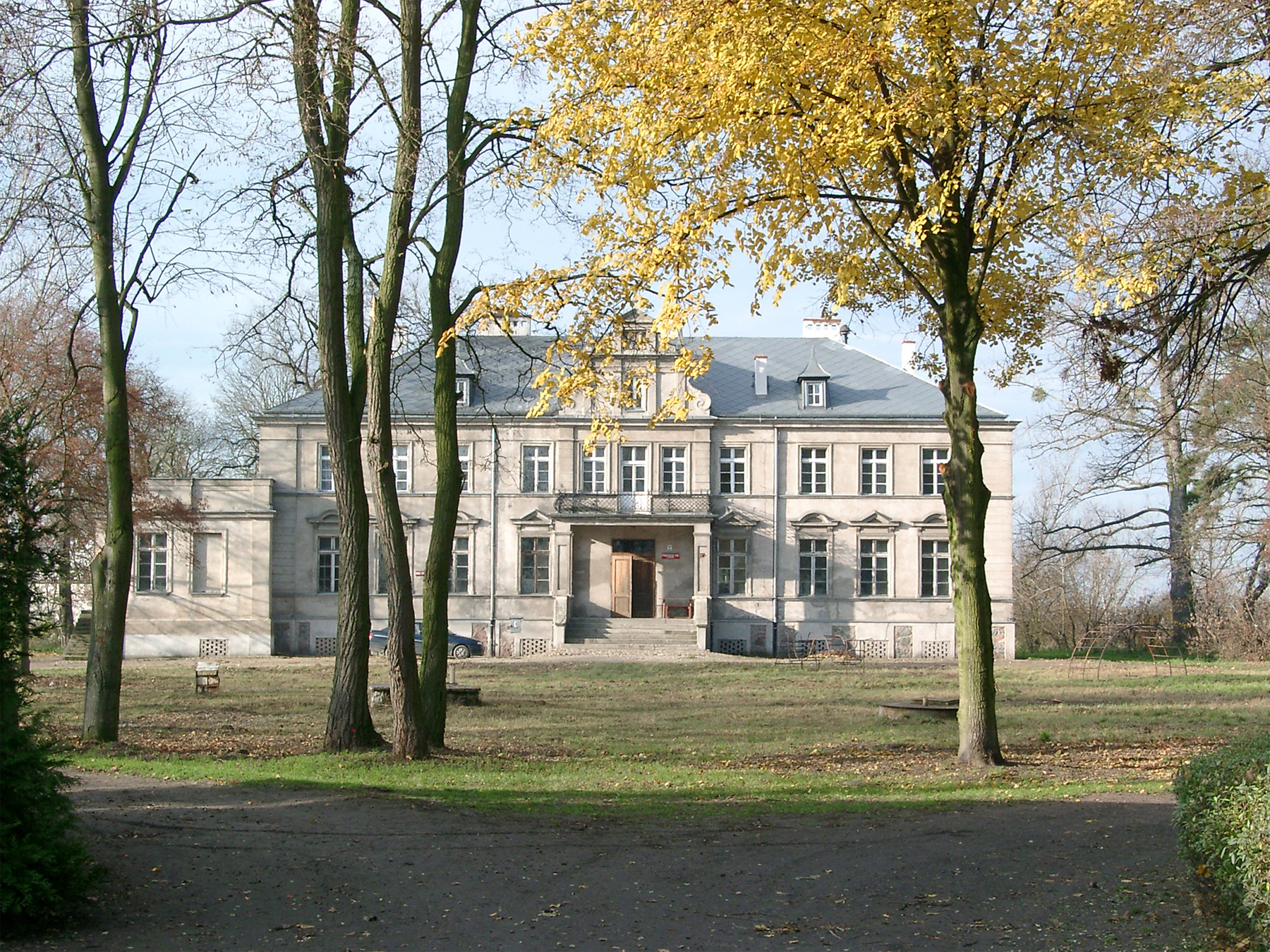
- Palace

- Location within Poland
- Coordinates: 52°22′N 16°27′E
- Country: Poland
- Voivodeship: Greater Poland
- County: Nowy Tomyśl
- Gmina: Opalenica
- Population: 344
- Website: http://www.niegolewo.info

Niegolewo [ɲɛɡɔˈlɛvɔ] is a village in the administrative district of Gmina Opalenica, within Nowy Tomyśl County, Greater Poland Voivodeship, in west-central Poland.
