= Sątopy =

Sątopy may refer to the following places in Poland:

- Sątopy, Greater Poland Voivodeship, village in the administrative district of Gmina Nowy Tomyśl
- Sątopy, Warmian-Masurian Voivodeship, village in the administrative district of Gmina Bisztynek
