= Neurose =

Neurose may refer to:

- Nowa Róża, Greater Poland Voivodeship, Poland, a village
- Labyrinth (1959 film), German–Italian drama
