= Zakrzewko, Nowy Tomyśl County =

Zakrzewko
- Village
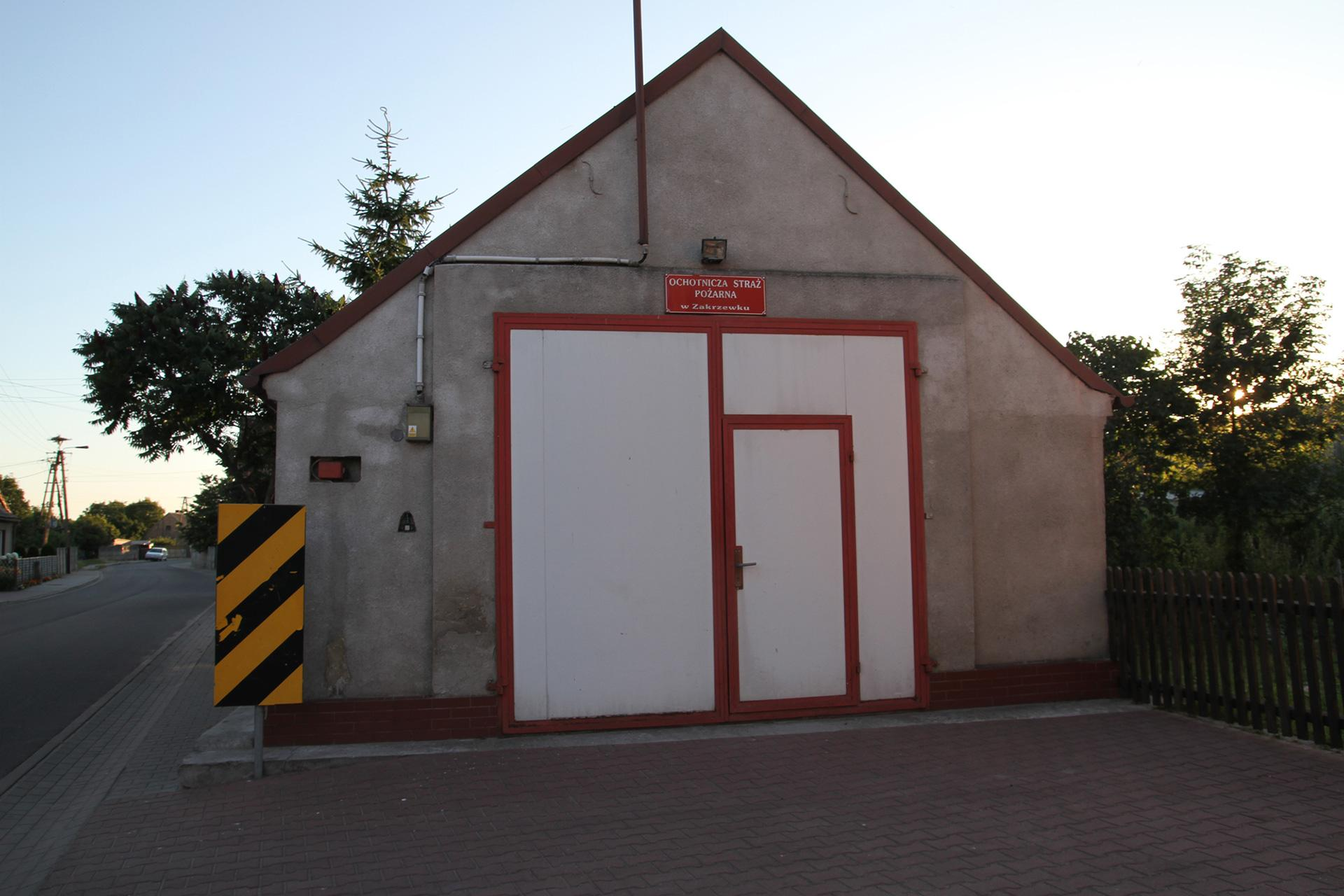

- Location within Poland
- Coordinates: 52°13′01″N 15°58′17″E
- Country: Poland
- Voivodeship: Greater Poland
- County: Nowy Tomyśl
- Gmina: Zbąszyń

Zakrzewko [zaˈkʂɛfkɔ] is a village in the administrative district of Gmina Zbąszyń, within Nowy Tomyśl County, Greater Poland Voivodeship, in west-central Poland.
