= Szklana Huta, Greater Poland Voivodeship =

Szklana Huta
- Settlement
- Location within Poland
- Coordinates: 52°18′22″N 15°59′31″E
- Country: Poland
- Voivodeship: Greater Poland
- County: Nowy Tomyśl
- Gmina: Zbąszyń

Szklana Huta [ˈʂklana ˈxuta] is a settlement in the administrative district of Gmina Zbąszyń, within Nowy Tomyśl County, Greater Poland Voivodeship, in west-central Poland.
