= Przyprostynia =

- Village
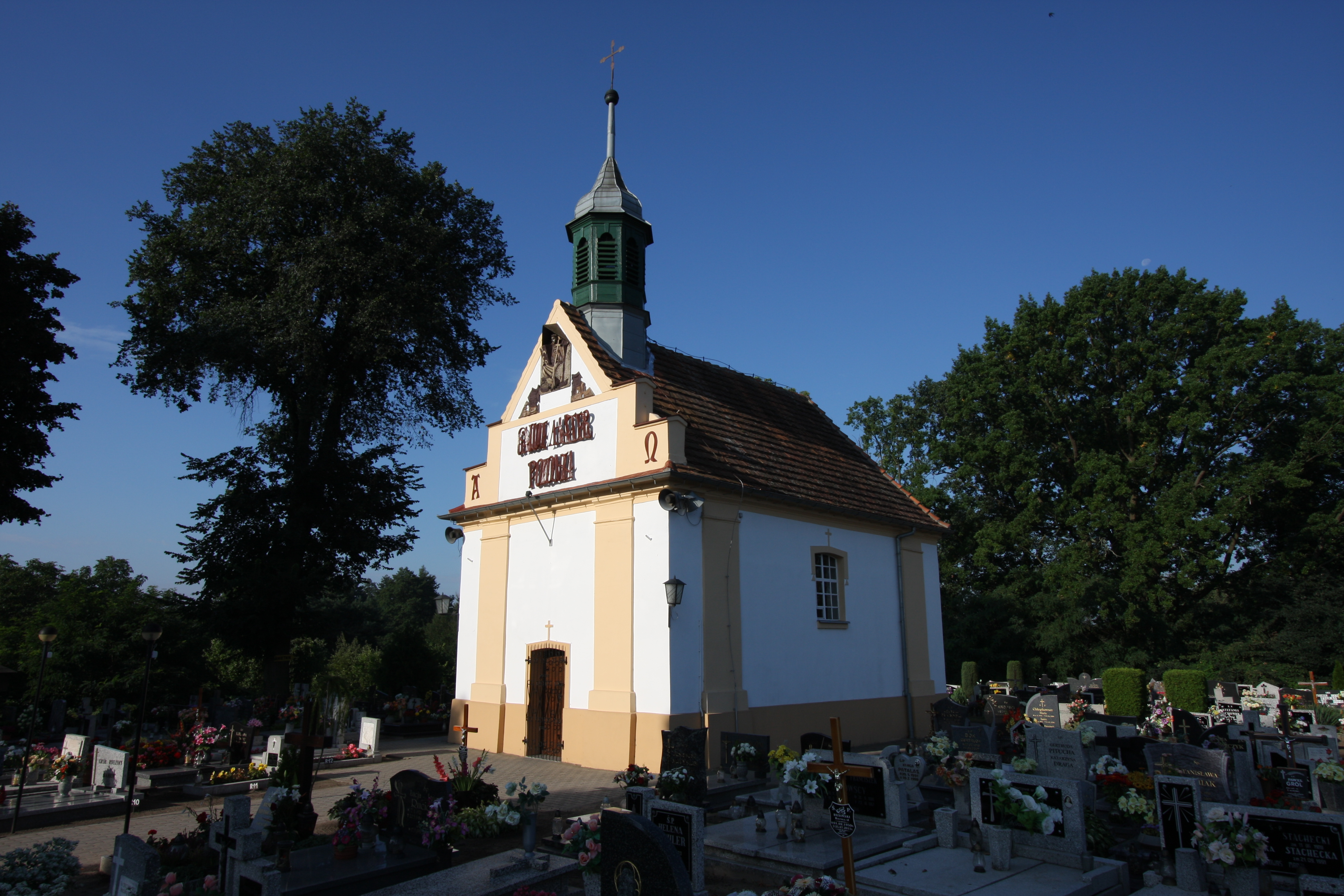

- Location within Poland
- Coordinates: 52°14′N 15°56′E
- Country: Poland
- Voivodeship: Greater Poland
- County: Nowy Tomyśl
- Gmina: Zbąszyń
- Population (approx.): 900
- Website: http://przyprostynia.prv.pl/

Przyprostynia [pʂɨprɔsˈtɨɲa] is a village in the administrative district of Gmina Zbąszyń, within Nowy Tomyśl County, Greater Poland Voivodeship, in west-central Poland.

The village has an approximate population of 900.
