= Nowy Świat, Nowy Tomyśl County =

Nowy Świat
- Settlement
- Location within Poland
- Coordinates: 52°16′10″N 15°55′52″E
- Country: Poland
- Voivodeship: Greater Poland
- County: Nowy Tomyśl
- Gmina: Zbąszyń

Nowy Świat (Polish pronunciation: [ˈnɔvɨ ˈɕfjat]) is a settlement in the administrative district of Gmina Zbąszyń, within Nowy Tomyśl County, Greater Poland Voivodeship, in west-central Poland.
