= Lewiczynek =

- Village
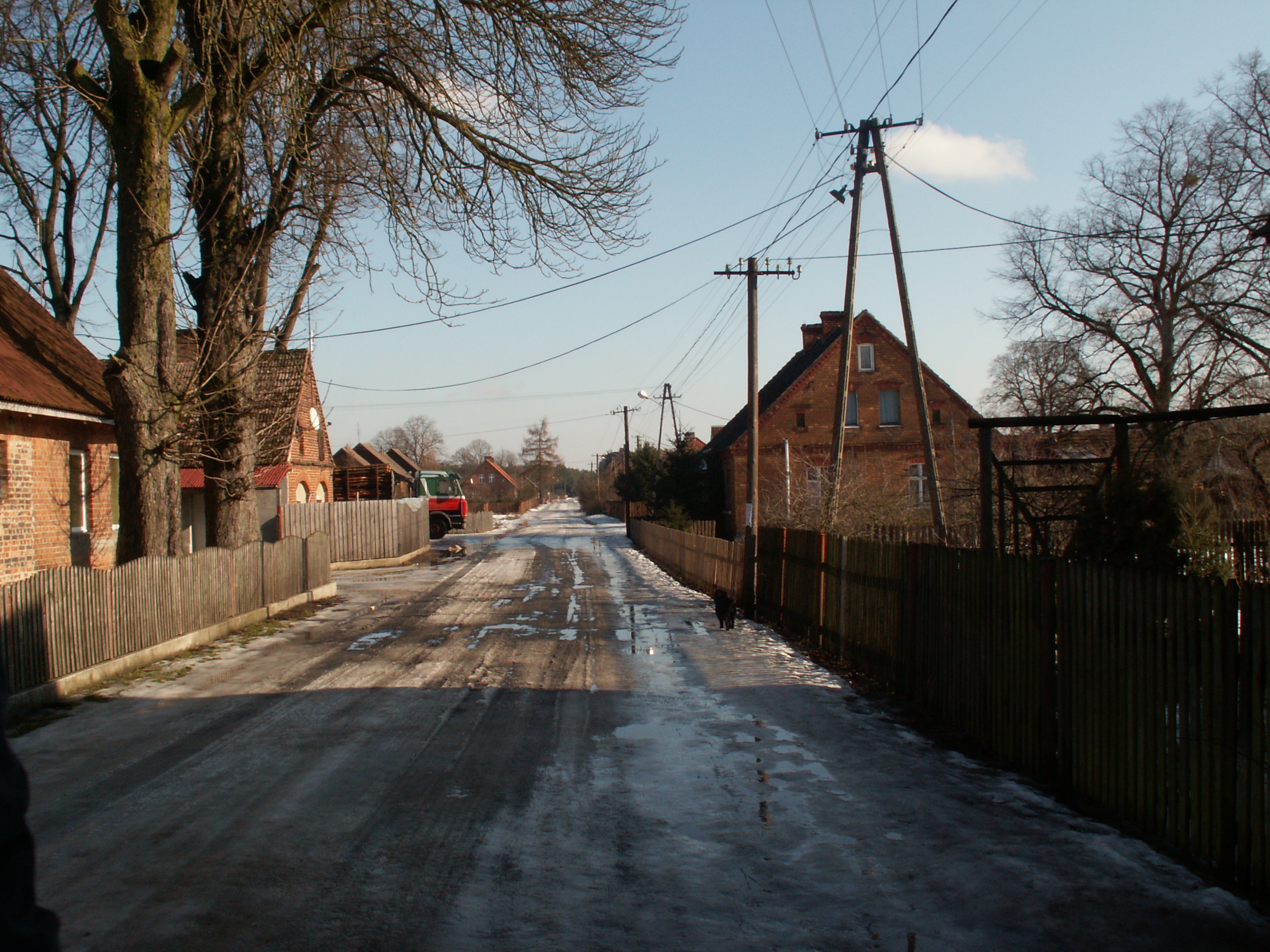

- Location within Poland
- Coordinates: 52°26′16″N 15°58′10″E
- Country: Poland
- Voivodeship: Greater Poland
- County: Nowy Tomyśl
- Gmina: Miedzichowo
- Population (approx.): 104

Lewiczynek [lɛviˈt͡ʂɨnɛk] is a village in the administrative district of Gmina Miedzichowo, within Nowy Tomyśl County, Greater Poland Voivodeship, in west-central Poland.

The village has an approximate population of 104.
