= Gmina Zbąszyń =

Gmina Zbąszyń Zbąszyń Commune
- Gmina
- Coat of arms
- Interactive map of Gmina Zbąszyń
- Coordinates (Zbąszyń): 52°15′11″N 15°55′4″E
- Country: Poland
- Voivodeship: Greater Poland
- County: Nowy Tomyśl
- Seat: Zbąszyń

Area
  - Total: 179.77 km^{2} (69.41 sq mi)

Population (2011)
  - Total: 13,565
  - Density: 75.458/km^{2} (195.43/sq mi)
  - Urban: 7,215
  - Rural: 6,350
- Website: www.zbaszyn.pl

Gmina Zbąszyń is an urban-rural gmina (administrative district) in Nowy Tomyśl County, Greater Poland Voivodeship, in west-central Poland. Its seat is the town of Zbąszyń, which lies approximately 17 kilometres (11 mi) south-west of Nowy Tomyśl and 70 km (43 mi) west of the regional capital Poznań.

The gmina covers an area of 179.77 square kilometres (69.4 sq mi), and as of 2006 its total population is 13,469 (out of which the population of Zbąszyń amounts to 7,300, and the population of the rural part of the gmina is 6,169).

== Villages ==
Apart from the town of Zbąszyń, Gmina Zbąszyń contains the villages and settlements of Chrośnica, Czerwony Dwór, Dąbrowa, Edmundowo, Ernestynowo, Kopce, Leśne Domki, Łomnica, Morgi, Nądnia, Nowa Wieś Zbąska, Nowa Wieś-Zamek, Nowe Czeskie, Nowe Jastrzębsko, Nowy Dwór, Nowy Świat, Perzyny, Piaski, Poświętne, Przychodzko, Przyprostynia, Stare Czeskie, Stefanowice, Stefanowo, Strzyżewo, Szklana Huta and Zakrzewko.

== Neighbouring gminas ==
Gmina Zbąszyń is bordered by the gminas of Babimost, Miedzichowo, Nowy Tomyśl, Siedlec, Trzciel and Zbąszynek.
