= Gmina Nowy Tomyśl =

Gmina Nowy Tomyśl Nowy Tomyśl Commune
- Gmina
- Flag Coat of arms
- Interactive map of Gmina Nowy Tomyśl
- Coordinates (Nowy Tomyśl): 52°19′0″N 16°8′0″E
- Country: Poland
- Voivodeship: Greater Poland
- County: Nowy Tomyśl
- Seat: Nowy Tomyśl

Area
  - Total: 185.89 km^{2} (71.77 sq mi)

Population (2011)
  - Total: 25,423
  - Density: 136.76/km^{2} (354.22/sq mi)
  - Urban: 15,095
  - Rural: 10,328
- Website: www.nowytomysl.pl

Gmina Nowy Tomyśl is an urban-rural gmina (administrative district) in Nowy Tomyśl County, Greater Poland Voivodeship, in west-central Poland. Its seat is the town of Nowy Tomyśl, which lies approximately 55 kilometres (34 mi) west of the regional capital Poznań.

The gmina covers an area of 185.89 square kilometres (71.8 sq mi), and as of 2006 its total population is 24,237 (out of which the population of Nowy Tomyśl amounts to 15,225, and the population of the rural part of the gmina is 9,012).

== Villages ==
Apart from the town of Nowy Tomyśl, Gmina Nowy Tomyśl contains the villages and settlements of Boruja Kościelna, Bukowiec, Chojniki, Cicha Góra, Glinno, Grubsko, Jastrzębsko Stare, Kozie Laski, Nowa Róża, Paproć, Przyłęk, Róża, Sątopy, Sękowo, Stary Tomyśl, Szarki and Wytomyśl.

== Neighbouring gminas ==
Gmina Nowy Tomyśl is bordered by the gminas of Grodzisk Wielkopolski, Kuślin, Lwówek, Miedzichowo, Opalenica, Rakoniewice, Siedlec and Zbąszyń.
