= Chrośnica, Greater Poland Voivodeship =

Chrośnica
- Village
- Location within Poland
- Coordinates: 52°16′N 16°0′E
- Country: Poland
- Voivodeship: Greater Poland
- County: Nowy Tomyśl
- Gmina: Zbąszyń
- Population: 544

Chrośnica [xrɔɕˈnit͡sa] is a village in the administrative district of Gmina Zbąszyń, within Nowy Tomyśl County, Greater Poland Voivodeship, in west-central Poland.
