= Toczeń, Greater Poland Voivodeship =

Toczeń
- Village
- Location within Poland
- Coordinates: 52°22′N 16°0′E
- Country: Poland
- Voivodeship: Greater Poland
- County: Nowy Tomyśl
- Gmina: Miedzichowo

Toczeń [ˈtɔt͡ʂɛɲ] (German: Tschocken) is a village in the administrative district of Gmina Miedzichowo, within Nowy Tomyśl County, Greater Poland Voivodeship, in west-central Poland.
