= Kopce, Greater Poland Voivodeship =

Kopce
- Settlement
- Location within Poland
- Coordinates: 52°18′4″N 15°59′21″E
- Country: Poland
- Voivodeship: Greater Poland
- County: Nowy Tomyśl
- Gmina: Zbąszyń

Kopce [ˈkɔpt͡sɛ] is a settlement in the administrative district of Gmina Zbąszyń, within Nowy Tomyśl County, Greater Poland Voivodeship, in west-central Poland.
