= Stefanowice, Greater Poland Voivodeship =

Stefanowice
- Village
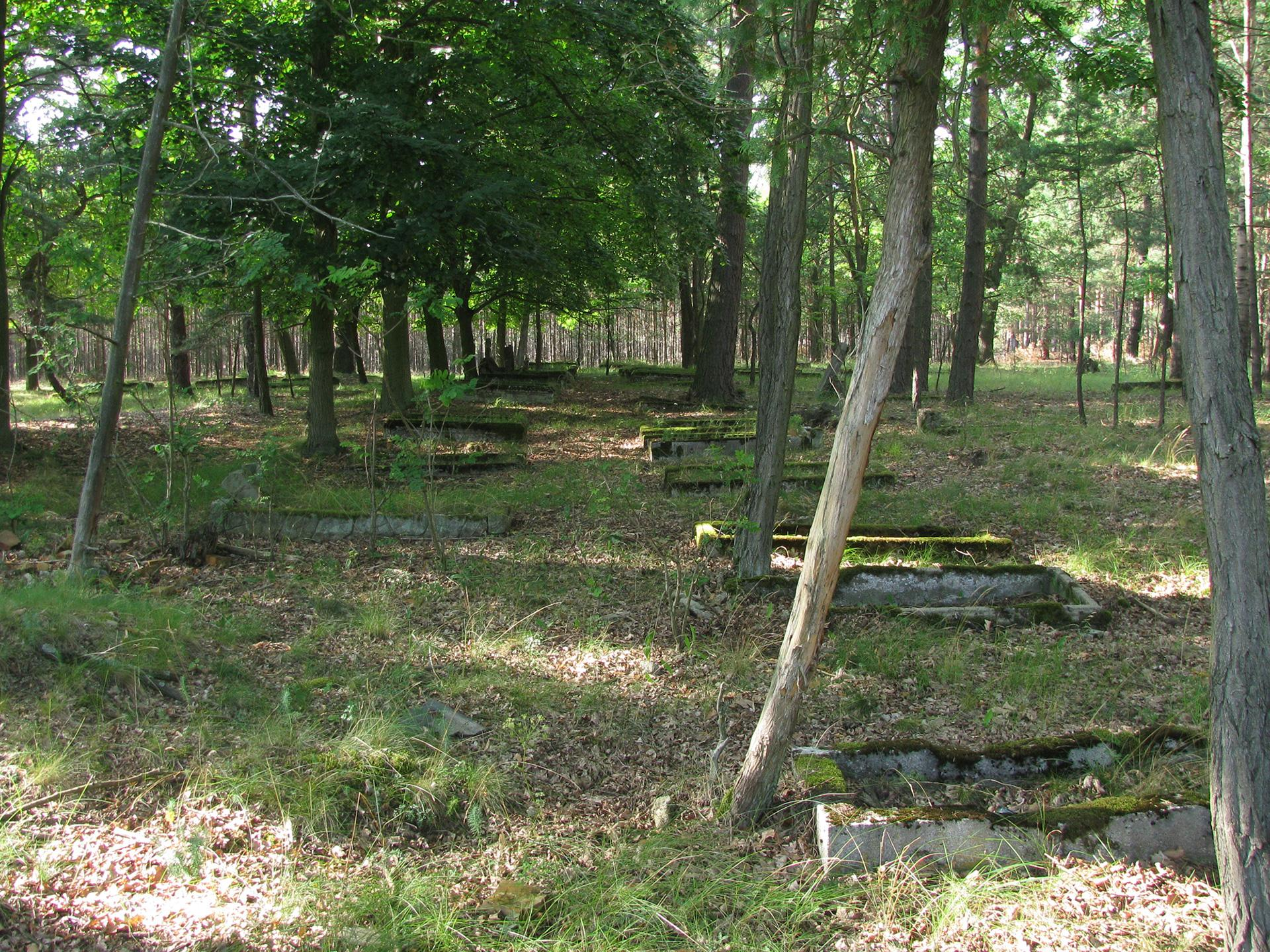

- Location within Poland
- Coordinates: 52°15′N 16°02′E
- Country: Poland
- Voivodeship: Greater Poland
- County: Nowy Tomyśl
- Gmina: Zbąszyń

Stefanowice [stɛfanɔˈvit͡sɛ] is a village in the administrative district of Gmina Zbąszyń, within Nowy Tomyśl County, Greater Poland Voivodeship, in west-central Poland.
