= Glinno, Nowy Tomyśl County =

Glinno
- Village
- Location within Poland
- Coordinates: 52°20′N 16°7′E
- Country: Poland
- Voivodeship: Greater Poland
- County: Nowy Tomyśl
- Gmina: Nowy Tomyśl
- Population: 974

Glinno [ˈɡlinnɔ] is a village in the administrative district of Gmina Nowy Tomyśl, within Nowy Tomyśl County, Greater Poland Voivodeship, in west-central Poland.
