= Miedzichowo =

- Village
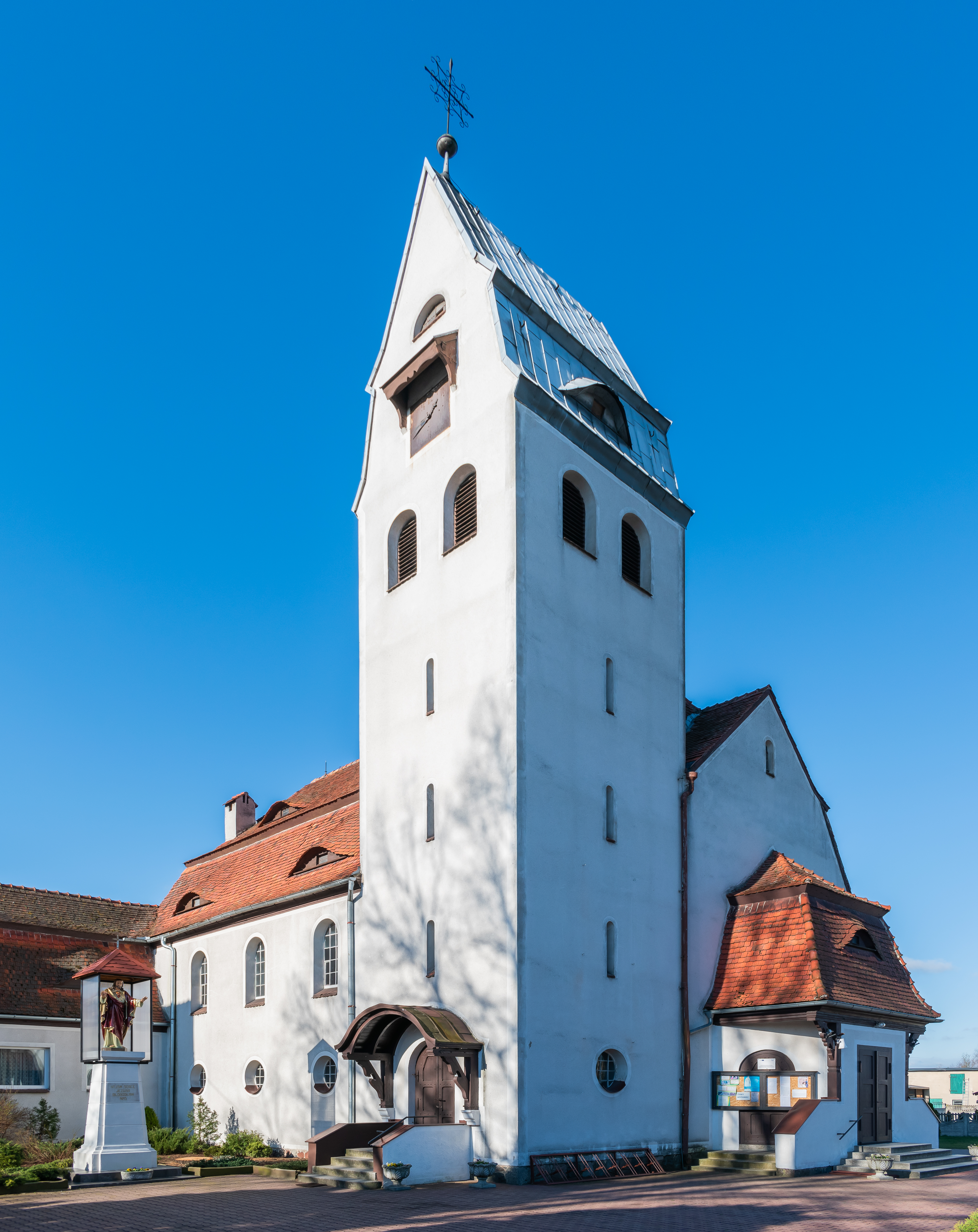
- Saint Stanislaus Church

- Location within Poland
- Coordinates: 52°22′26″N 15°57′19″E
- Country: Poland
- Voivodeship: Greater Poland
- County: Nowy Tomyśl
- Gmina: Miedzichowo
- Population: 471
- Website: http://www.miedzichowo.pl

Miedzichowo [mjɛd͡ʑiˈxɔvɔ] is a village in Nowy Tomyśl County, Greater Poland Voivodeship, in west-central Poland. It is the seat of the gmina (administrative district) called Gmina Miedzichowo.
