= Czerwony Dwór, Greater Poland Voivodeship =

Czerwony Dwór
- Settlement
- Location within Poland
- Coordinates: 52°15′21″N 15°57′27″E
- Country: Poland
- Voivodeship: Greater Poland
- County: Nowy Tomyśl
- Gmina: Zbąszyń

Czerwony Dwór [t͡ʂɛrˈvɔnɨ ˈdvur] is a settlement in the administrative district of Gmina Zbąszyń, within Nowy Tomyśl County, Greater Poland Voivodeship, in west-central Poland.
