= Nowy Tomyśl =

Town in Greater Poland Voivodeship, Poland

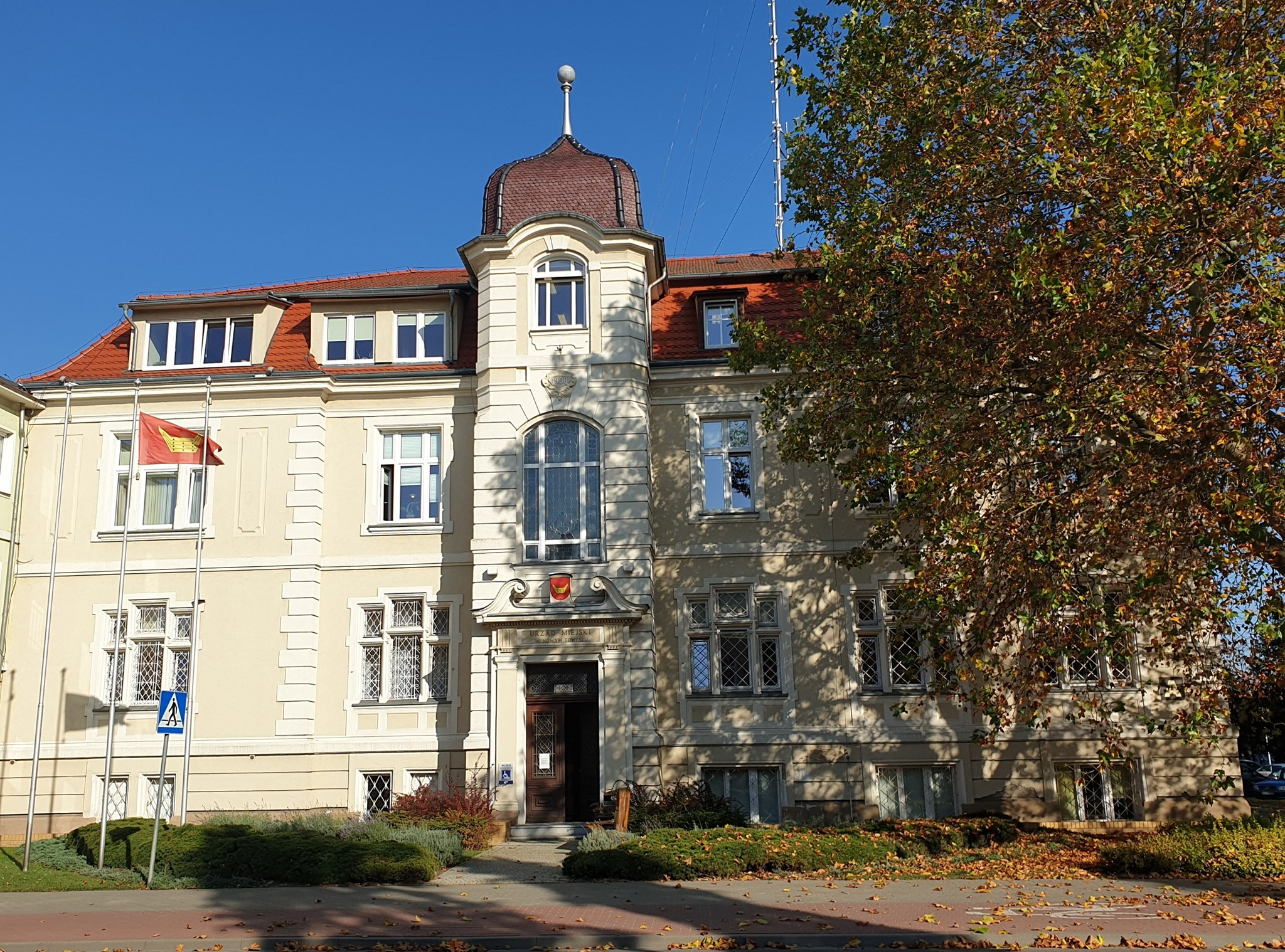
- Nowy Tomyśl town hall

- Flag Coat of arms

- Location within Poland
- Coordinates: 52°19′0″N 16°8′0″E
- Country: Poland
- Voivodeship: Greater Poland
- County: Nowy Tomyśl
- Gmina: Nowy Tomyśl

Area
  - Total: 5.2 km^{2} (2.0 sq mi)
- Elevation: 70 m (230 ft)

Population (2006)
  - Total: 15,225
  - Density: 2,900/km^{2} (7,600/sq mi)
- Postal code: 64-300, 64-301
- Vehicle registration: PNT
- Website: https://www.nowytomysl.pl

Nowy Tomyśl [ˈnɔvɨ ˈtɔmɨɕl] is a town in western Poland, in Greater Poland Voivodeship. It is the capital of Nowy Tomyśl County. The population is 15,627 (2004).

== Sights ==
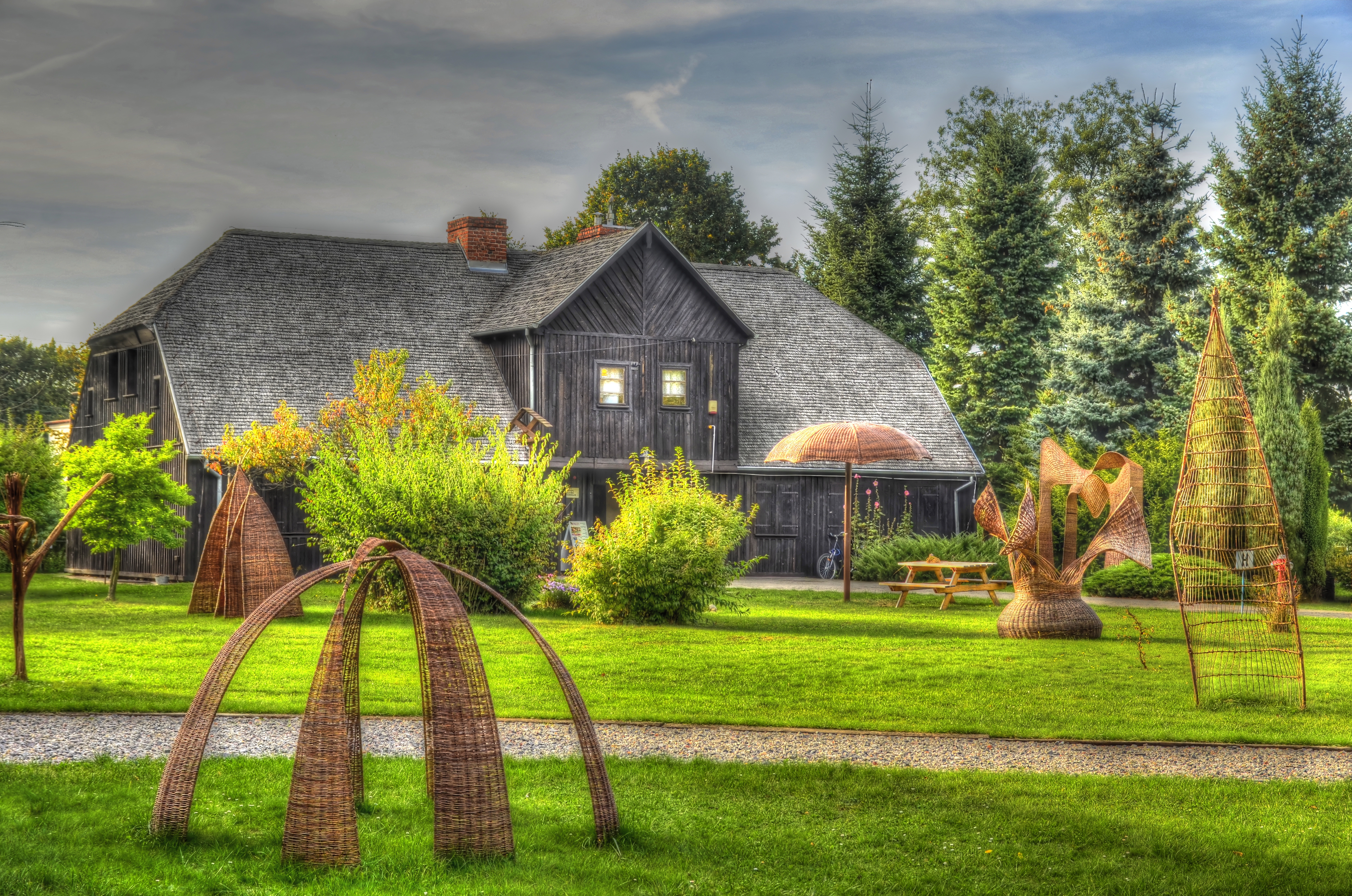
Museum of Basketry in Nowy Tomyśl

The town has a long tradition of wickerwork. In the main town square stands a wicker basket woven in 2006, measuring 17 metres (56 ft) long, 9 m wide and 7.7 m high, entered in the Guinness Book of Records as the world's largest basket. The town also has a Museum of Basketry and Hop Growing, which is one of the branches of the National Museum of Agriculture in Szreniawa. Next to the museum is a small zoo.

== History ==
According to the 1910 census, the population of the town was 2,015, of whom 1,795 (89%) reported German as their sole mother tongue, while 212 (11%) reported Polish; the Jewish population was 98 (5%). After World War I, city and its surroundings were assigned to Poland by the Treaty of Versailles.

Following the joint German-Soviet invasion of Poland, which started World War II in September 1939, the town was occupied by Germany until 1945. In December 1939, the German gendarmerie carried out the first expulsions of Poles, including families of intelligentsia, activists and owners of workshops, bakeries and restaurants, which were then handed over to German colonists as part of the Lebensraum policy. Expelled Poles were deported to a transit camp in Młyniewo, and then to the Radom District in the more-eastern part of German-occupied Poland. In January 1945, a German-perpetrated death march of prisoners of various nationalities from the dissolved camp in Żabikowo to the Sachsenhausen concentration camp passed through the town.

Since 2012, Nowy Tomyśl has been the site of one of the tallest wind turbines in the world.

== Notable people ==
- Sławomir Busch (born 1998), Polish volleyball player
- Mateusz Kościukiewicz (born 1986), Polish actor
- Paweł Najdek (born 1973), Polish weightlifter
- Tomasz Tomiak (1967–2020), Polish rower
