= Nowy Tomyśl County =

Nowy Tomyśl County Powiat nowotomyski
- County
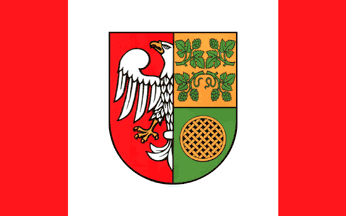
- Flag Coat of arms

- Location within the voivodeship

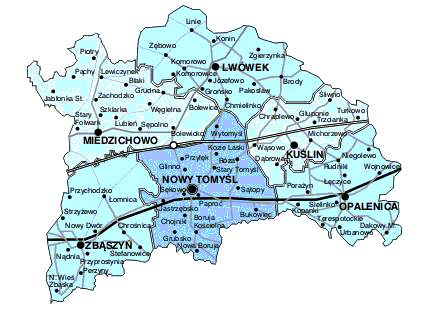
- Division into gminas
- Coordinates (Nowy Tomyśl): 52°19′0″N 16°8′0″E
- Country: Poland
- Voivodeship: Greater Poland
- Seat: Nowy Tomyśl
- Gminas: Total 6: Gmina Kuślin; Gmina Lwówek; Gmina Miedzichowo; Gmina Nowy Tomyśl; Gmina Opalenica; Gmina Zbąszyń

Area
  - Total: 1,011.67 km^{2} (390.61 sq mi)

Population (2006)
  - Total: 71,817
  - Density: 70.989/km^{2} (183.86/sq mi)
  - Urban: 34,538
  - Rural: 37,279
- Car plates: PNT
- Website: powiatnowotomyski.pl

Nowy Tomyśl County (Polish: powiat nowotomyski) is a unit of territorial administration and local government (powiat) in Greater Poland Voivodeship, west-central Poland. It came into being on January 1, 1999, as a result of the Polish local government reforms passed in 1998. Its administrative seat and largest town is Nowy Tomyśl, which lies 55 kilometres (34 mi) west of the regional capital Poznań. The county contains three other towns: Opalenica, 20 km (12 mi) east of Nowy Tomyśl, Zbąszyń, 17 km (11 mi) south-west of Nowy Tomyśl, and Lwówek, 16 km (10 mi) north of Nowy Tomyśl.

The county covers an area of 1,011.67 square kilometres (390.6 sq mi). As of 2006 its total population is 71,817, out of which the population of Nowy Tomyśl is 15,225, that of Opalenica is 9,104, that of Zbąszyń is 7,300, that of Lwówek is 2,909, and the rural population is 37,279.

== Neighbouring counties ==
Nowy Tomyśl County is bordered by Międzychód County to the north, Szamotuły County to the north-east, Poznań County and Grodzisk County to the east, Wolsztyn County to the south, Zielona Góra County to the south-west, and Świebodzin County and Międzyrzecz County to the west.

== Administrative divisions ==
The county is subdivided into six gminas (four urban-rural and two rural). These are listed in the following table, in descending order of population.

Gmina	Type	Area (km^{2})	Population (2006)	Seat
Gmina Nowy Tomyśl	urban-rural	185.9	24,237	Nowy Tomyśl
Gmina Opalenica	urban-rural	147.7	15,588	Opalenica
Gmina Zbąszyń	urban-rural	179.8	13,469	Zbąszyń
Gmina Lwówek	urban-rural	183.5	9,151	Lwówek
Gmina Kuślin	rural	106.3	5,571	Kuślin
Gmina Miedzichowo	rural	208.5	3,801	Miedzichowo
