= Olenders =

European ethnic people

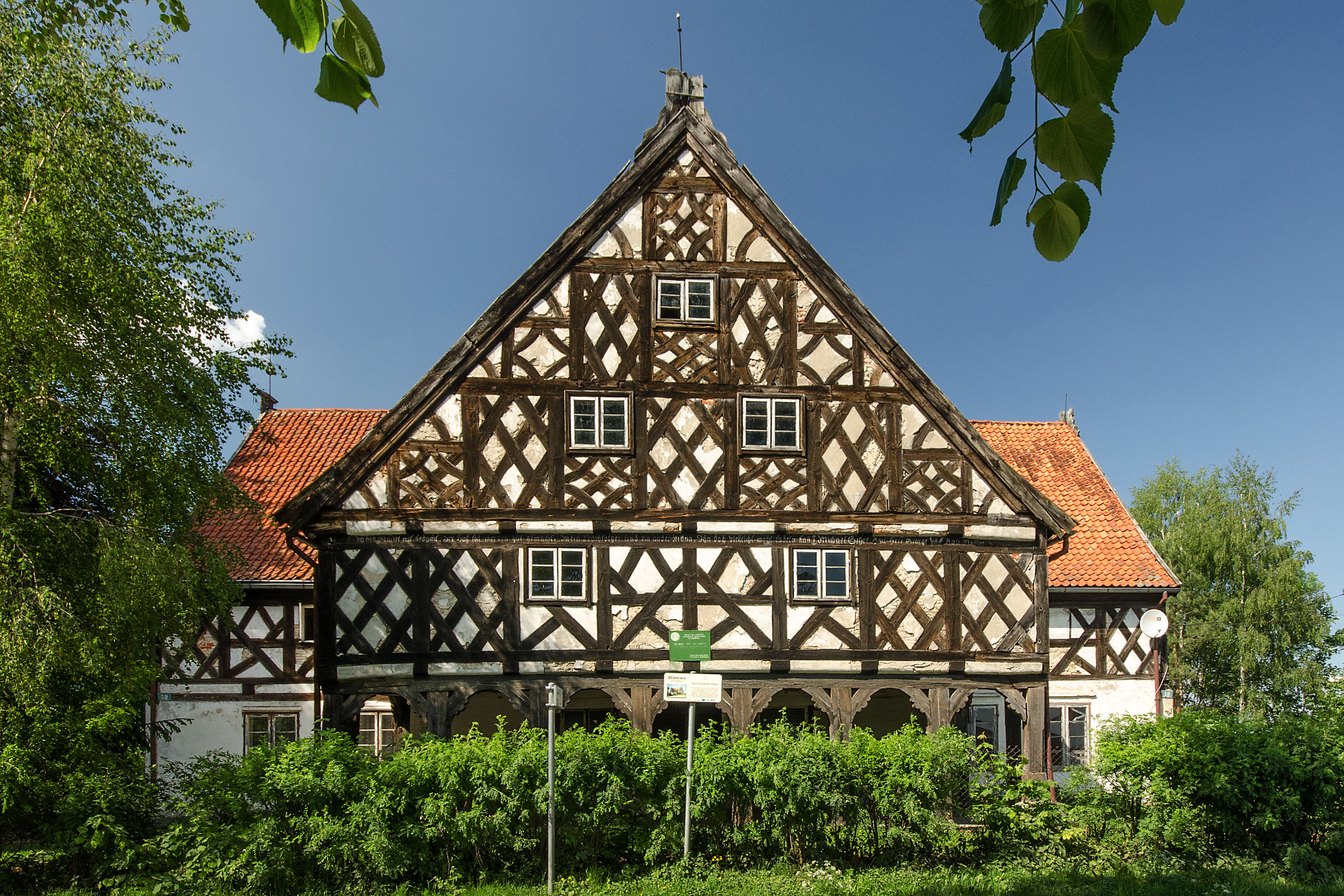
- A timberframed house in the village of Stalewo, Poland

Regions with significant populations
- Poland, especially Pomerania, Greater Poland, Kuyavia, Mazovia, Powiśle

Related ethnic groups
- Dutch people, Frisians

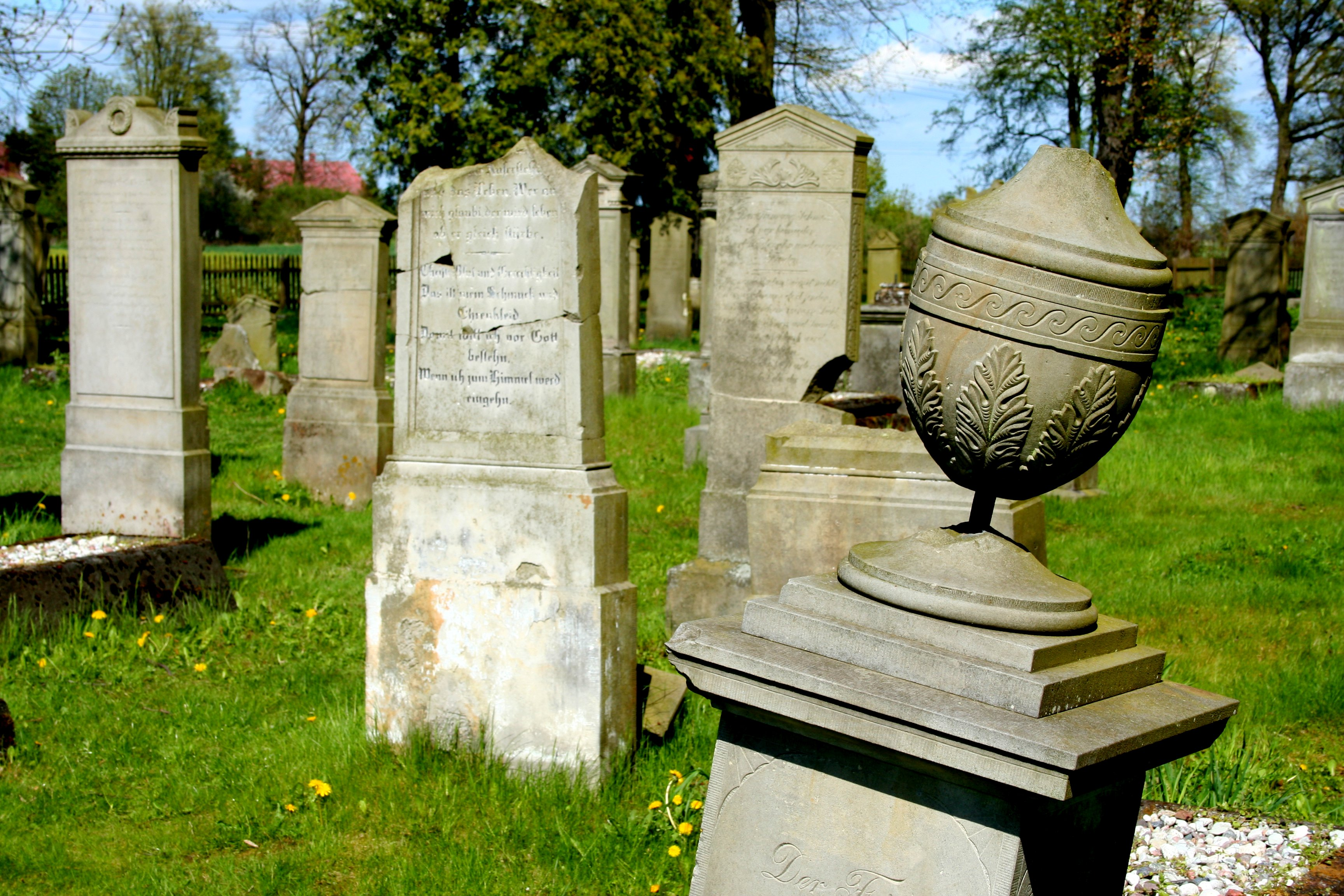
A historical Mennonite cemetery in Stogi, Poland

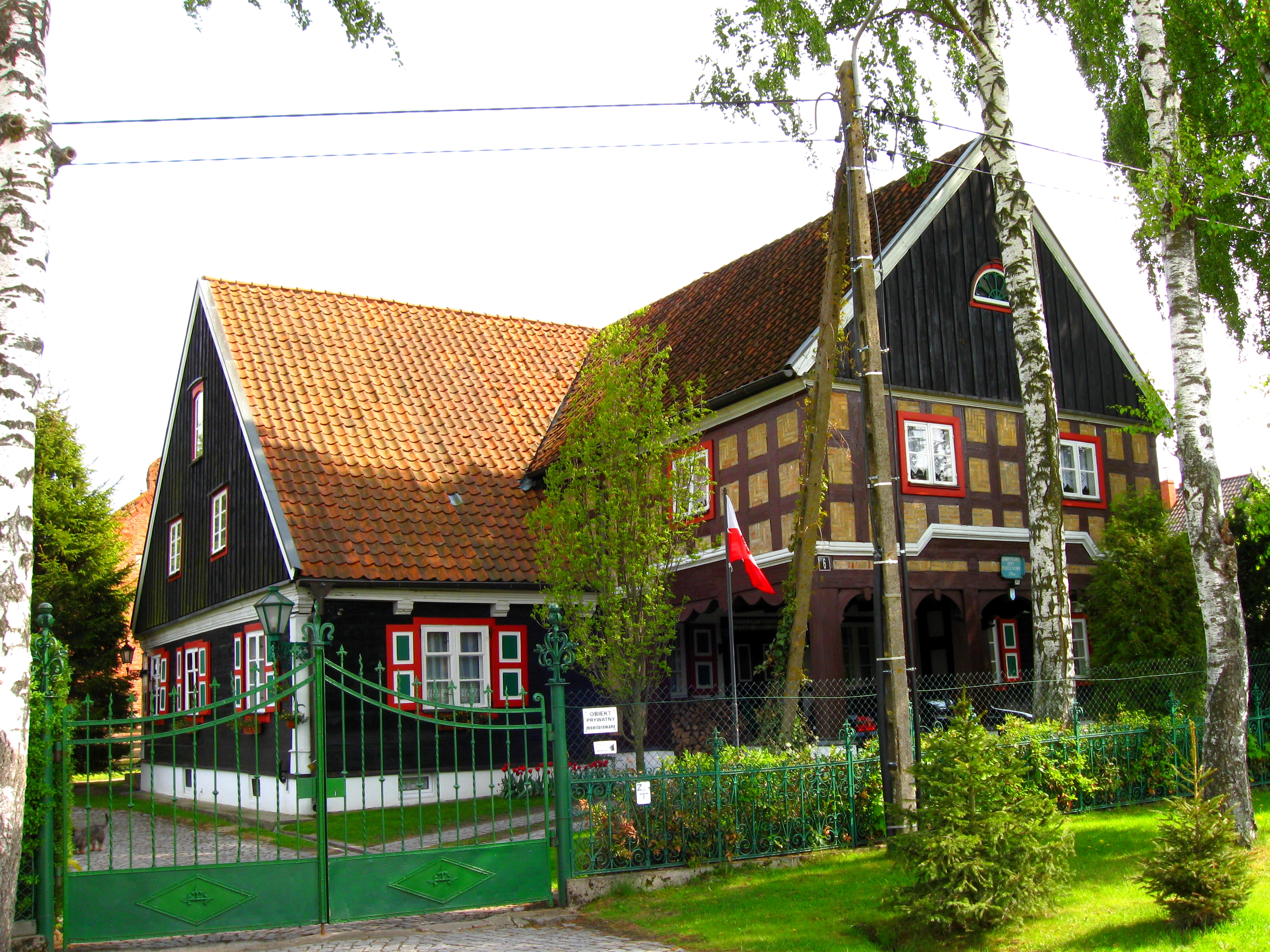
An 18th-century Mennonite house in Żuławki, Poland

Olenders (Polish: Olędrzy Polish: [ɔˈlɛndʐɘ̟] or Olendrzy, singular form: Olęder, Olender; German: Holländer, Hauländer) were people, often of Dutch or Frisian ancestry, who lived in settlements in Poland organized under a particular type of law.

The term Olender has been used to describe two related, but slightly different, groups of settlers. First, it describes settlers in Poland from Frisia and the rest of the Netherlands, most often of the Mennonite faith, who in the 16th and 17th centuries founded villages in Royal Prussia, along the Vistula River and its tributaries, in Kuyavia, Mazovia and Greater Poland. They settled in great numbers in Gdańsk. They possessed knowledge of flood control, and a well-developed agrarian culture. At that time, they were the wealthiest group of peasants. They maintained personal freedom, and their own religion and beliefs. After the First Partition of Poland, some of them emigrated to southern Ukraine.

Second, in a later period (up to the middle of the 19th century), the term Olędrzy (German: Hauländer) was used to describe settlers of different ethnicities (principally Germans and Poles, at times Scots, Czechs, and Hungarians), who benefited from certain privileges resulting from the law established by the Frisian and Dutch peasants (such as personal freedom, (Note: This was not the exclusive domain of the Olędrzy. The privilege of personal freedom was enjoyed by almost all village settlers from the 16th to the 18th century, such as, for example, settlers under the Kulm Law.) long-term or perpetual use of land, and the possibility of transmitting land to heirs). The most important characteristic, however, was collective responsibility of the entire Olęder community for its obligations toward the land owner and the specific character of the community's self-government. Thus, the distinguishing characteristics of an Olęder settlement are legal, and not ethnic, religious or economic. Consequently, the word Olęder is not synonymous with "Dutch settler."

According to studies conducted so far, from 1527/1547 to 1864 on the terrain of the Polish–Lithuanian Commonwealth, later divided into three parts in the Partitions of Poland, at least 1700 Olęder settlements were established. Of those, in at least 300 settlements, the settlers were ethnic Dutch. Traces of these settlements are still visible in village architecture, the physical layout of villages, and in the names of villages (Holendry, Olędry, Olendry, etc.)

== Terminology ==
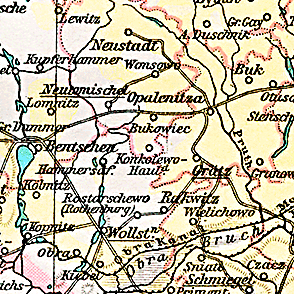
Part of a 1905 map of Poznan province, showing the village of Konkolewo Hauland (today Kąkolewo), founded in 1720, located between Nowy Tomyśl (Neutomischel) and Grodzisk Wielkopolski (Grätz).

Polish sources use a variety of terms for olęder settlers: Hollendrzy, Holędrzy, Holendrzy, Olędrzy, and Olendrzy. These are interchangeable, and derive from the first settlers from the Netherlands, who moved into Ducal Prussia and Royal Prussia beginning in the 16th century. It is important, however, to recognize that over time the term lost its ethnic meaning, and therefore Olendrzy refers to all settlers living under the legal regime introduced by the Dutch colonists, including most notably the Vistula Germans and Vistula delta Mennonites.

It is also important to underline, that not all settlements carrying the name Olędry (or similar) were in fact settled by Olęders. Rusiński gives examples of such instances in Greater Poland: Wymysłowo (known in some sources as Czarkowskie Olędry) or Burzykowo in the parish of Oborniki (on some German maps called Burzykower Holl.). Rusiński argues that although though those villages had the name Olędry, that is not a basis for calling them genuine olędry settlements, because in their cases one does not find the legal arrangements typical of such colonization (collective responsibility to the land owner and characteristic olęder self-government).

A separate problem is the question of the German words that function as two alternatives: Holländer and Hauländer. According to earlier German historical writings, they had two distinct meanings, reflecting a difference in the type of settlement. After all, Olędry were settled chiefly on difficult terrain, which required proper preparation to plant or raise livestock. The referenced historians argued that on low, wet terrain subject to flooding, settlers were called Holländer (in reference to the settlers from the Netherlands who were specialists in flood control and drainage), while those colonists who settled in thick forests requiring clearing were called Hauländer (from the German hauen – to hew, to chop). However, that viewpoint has been recognized as inaccurate (both in German history writing as well as Polish), as evidenced by those settlements on flood plains called Hauland and villages that appeared on the road to clearings in the forest called Holland. Most likely, the word Hauländer started as a variant of Holländer, and appeared through blending the names of settlements with the name for woodcutters.

== Reasons for colonization ==
The beginnings of Olęder colonization must be sought in the Middle Ages in the area where Germans lived. The first records come from the area of Bremen in the year 1106. At that time, settlement was closely linked to the territorial expansion of the German rulers into Slavic territory. Southern Holstein was colonized by Duke Adolf II of Holstein, while Albert "the Bear" and Henry "the Lion" installed settlers from the Netherlands in Brandenburg and Mecklenburg. (Indeed, Albert "the Bear" was an especially active coloniser.)

The beginning of the second wave of settlement from the Netherlands, this time directly to Polish soil, occurred in the 16th century. Three chief causes of that colonization can be distinguished:

- Religious persecution in the Netherlands

The Reformation found fertile ground there. Anabaptism, from which later arose the Mennonites, became widely accepted. At the same time, the Habsburg rulers of Spain, who also ruled the Netherlands -- Emperor Charles V and King Philip II – as devoted Catholics zealously sought to eradicate heresy in their territories. This led to Protestant emigration in search of a more tolerant environment.

- The Economic situation in the Netherlands

Unrest in the Netherlands, the struggle for independence during the Dutch Revolt, and the presence in the Netherlands of the Spanish army and the forces of William I of Orange led to collapse in the rural economy. The devastation of war led to common hunger, an epidemic of bubonic plague and frequent suffering. For many enterprising farmers this was an additional stimulus to emigrate.

- Depopulation of Prussia after the Polish–Teutonic War (1519–1521) and the Desire of Landowners for Greater Profits

As a final result of the Polish-Teutonic War, many villages on the borders of Prussia were devastated, and were deserted by their inhabitants. At the same time, the landowners endeavored to increase their incomes, by, among other things, cultivating new lands, especially by clearing forests and draining swamps. Immigrants from the Netherlands had centuries of experience with that latter task.

== Course of colonization ==
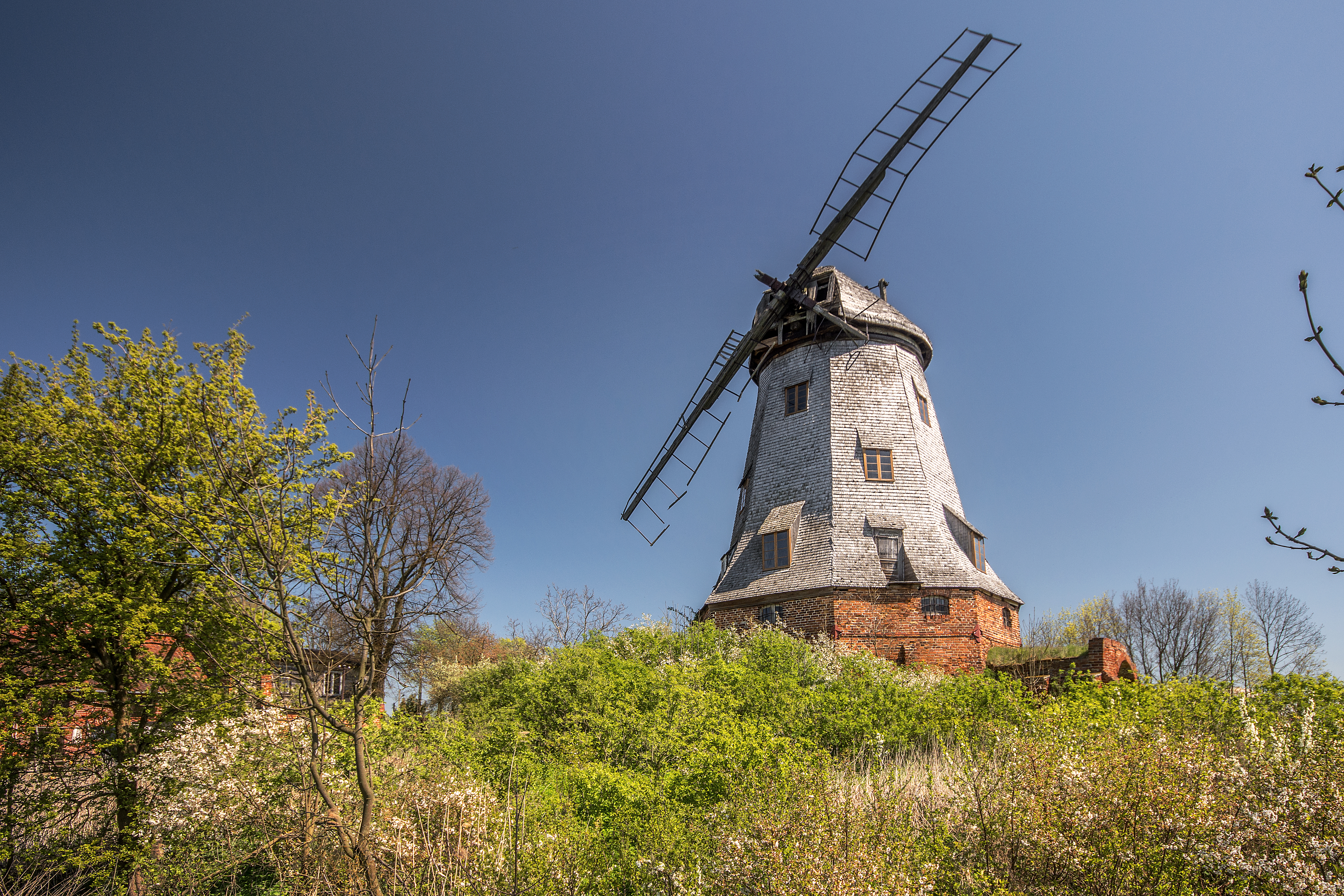
A windmill in Palczewo – one of the remnants of Olęder settlements in Żuławy

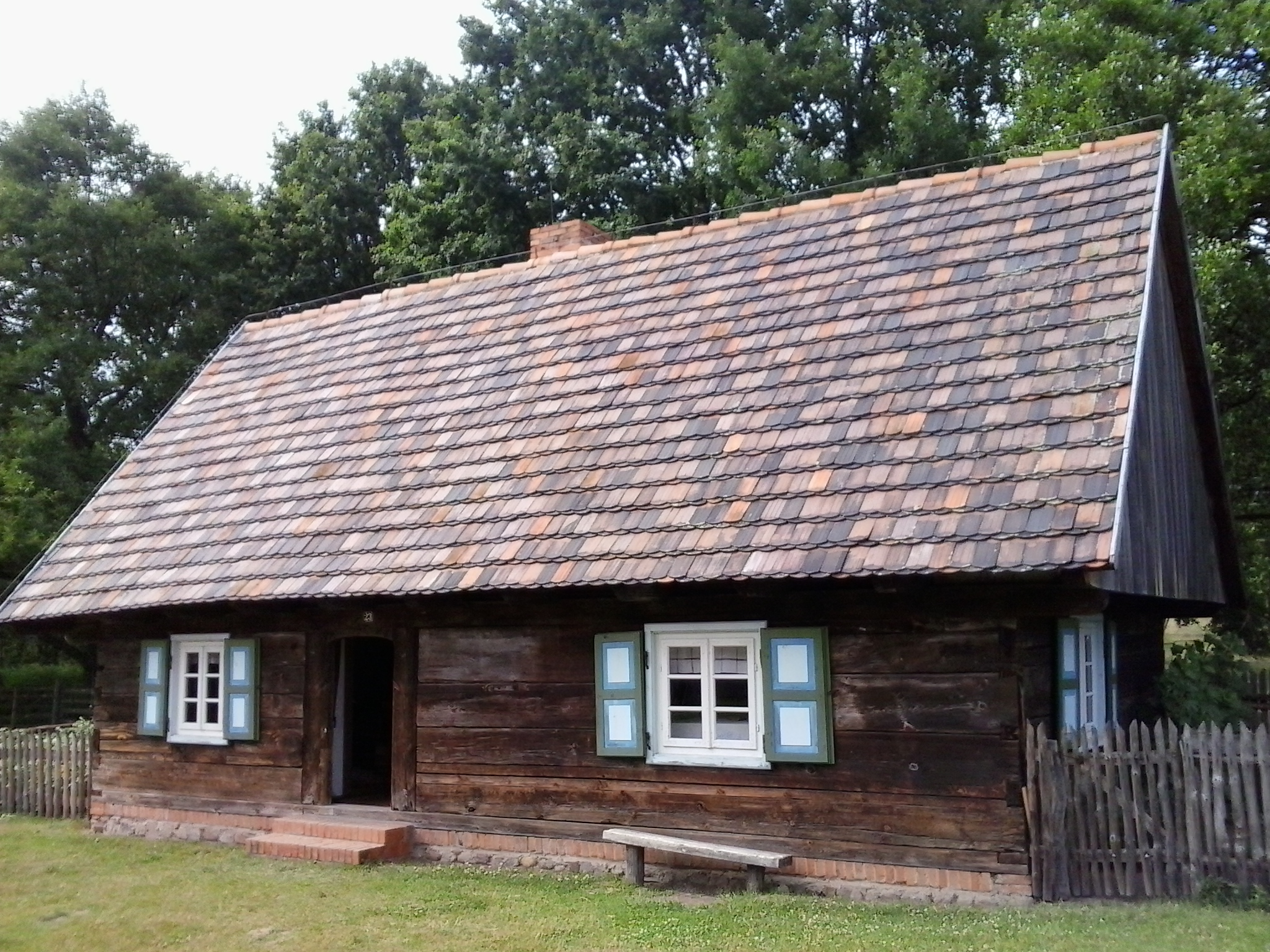
A skansen in Dziekanowice near Poznań. The open-air museum contains many relics of wooden Olęder architecture

Before Olęder settlers arrived on the soil of the Polish–Lithuanian Commonwealth, the Dutch were already present in Ducal Prussia, a vassal duchy of Poland. The first settlement in that region appeared in the area of modern-day Pasłęk. (Note: This town was founded by the Teutonic Knights in 1297; Rusiński gives the year 1527 as the date when an Olęnder settlement was founded in the area of Pasłęk. This was a settlement near a town that had been depopulated by war and the unusually cold winter of 1520.) There is a claim that they were participants in the killing of Floris V, Count of Holland in 1296, who then fled east, which is alluded to by Dutch poet Joost van den Vondel in his work Gijsbrecht van Aemstel (1637). However, conflicts frequently arose between the Dutch and Germans regarding property, religion and customary law. Before long, those first settlers began looking for a new home. The first Polish terrain colonized by newcomers from the Netherlands was in the province of Royal Prussia. In the middle of the 16th century, the government of Gdańsk, led by Mayor Ferber, decided to populate Żuławy Gdańskie, which had been given the city by King Casimir IV Jagiellon in 1454. The effort to settle locals there failed, because the peasants could not cope with flooding. Consequently, the people of Gdańsk agreed to an attempt to settle Netherlanders in the deserted village of Laudan. (Note: This may be a reference to Lędowo.) The newcomers from the Netherlands easily mastered the unfavorable conditions, and soon thereafter additional Olęder settlements appeared in Pomerania. Among others, these included Nowy Dwór (called Tiegenhof in 1562), Orłowo, Żelichowo, Markusy and Jurandowo. Soon colonization spread to the Starostwo of Puck (such as Karwieńskie Błoto and Reda), and – even more importantly – began to progress up the Vistula River.

Settlements appeared in the starostwas of Gniew and Sztum (including Szkaradowo, Benowo, Pułkowice, Szropy and Nowa Wieś). Olęder settlements were also located in the Osiek and Międzyłęż starostwas. The area around Nowe, Grudziądz and Świecie were also thickly settled. In 1597, Olęder settlement reached Greater Poland. A settlement appeared in Ługi Ujskie, near Ujście. Four years later another appeared in Nowe Dwory, on the Wieleński family's estate. In that instance, the colonization was directly linked to Pomerania, since the Wieleński lord's wife was the widow of the Starosta of Świecie. In 1624 the Dutch reached as far as Warsaw, where they settled, among other places, on Saska Kępa. Earlier (in the second half of the 16th century), they were already in the area of Lublin (18 settlements appeared in the area of Sławatycze, on the Bug River.). Olęder settlement continued to spread up to the times of the Partitions of Poland, and even reached Volhynia in present-day Ukraine, where they became known as Holendry (Ukrainian: Голєндри).

With the passage of time the national character of the settlers changed. While at the beginning they were almost entirely of Dutch origin (sometimes arriving directly from the Netherlands, sometimes moving on after an initial stop in Ducal Prussia), later, with increasing frequency, they were descendants of the original Dutch, born on Polish soil, and subsequently from a completely different ethnic group—most often German, sometimes Polish, and occasionally representatives of other groups. For example, in reference to Greater Poland, Rusiński wrote "of the Dutch nation ... it is generally difficult to speak." Chodyła gives a precise figure: descendants of the Dutch in Pomerania accounted for 0.8% of settlers; Evangelical (Lutheran) Germans, for 54%; and Polish Catholics, 38%. A further 7.2% were of mixed ethnicity and faith.

Most studies agree that the Partitions of Poland and subsequent period (up to the mid-19th century) was a turning point signalling the end of Olęder settlement. For example, many Mennonites abandoned the lands they had occupied in Prussia, because their religious beliefs did not allow them to perform military service, which conflicted with the ethos of such a heavily militaristic state. In addition, administrative reforms carried out by the partitioning powers eliminated the legal arrangements that constituted the distinguishing characteristic of Olęder settlements. (Note: In the case of Greater Poland, Rusiński presents 1823 as the end of the phenomenon of Olęder settlement, because that year a law establishing uniform local government and regulation of villages was introduced throughout the Kingdom of Prussia.)

== Settlement characteristics ==
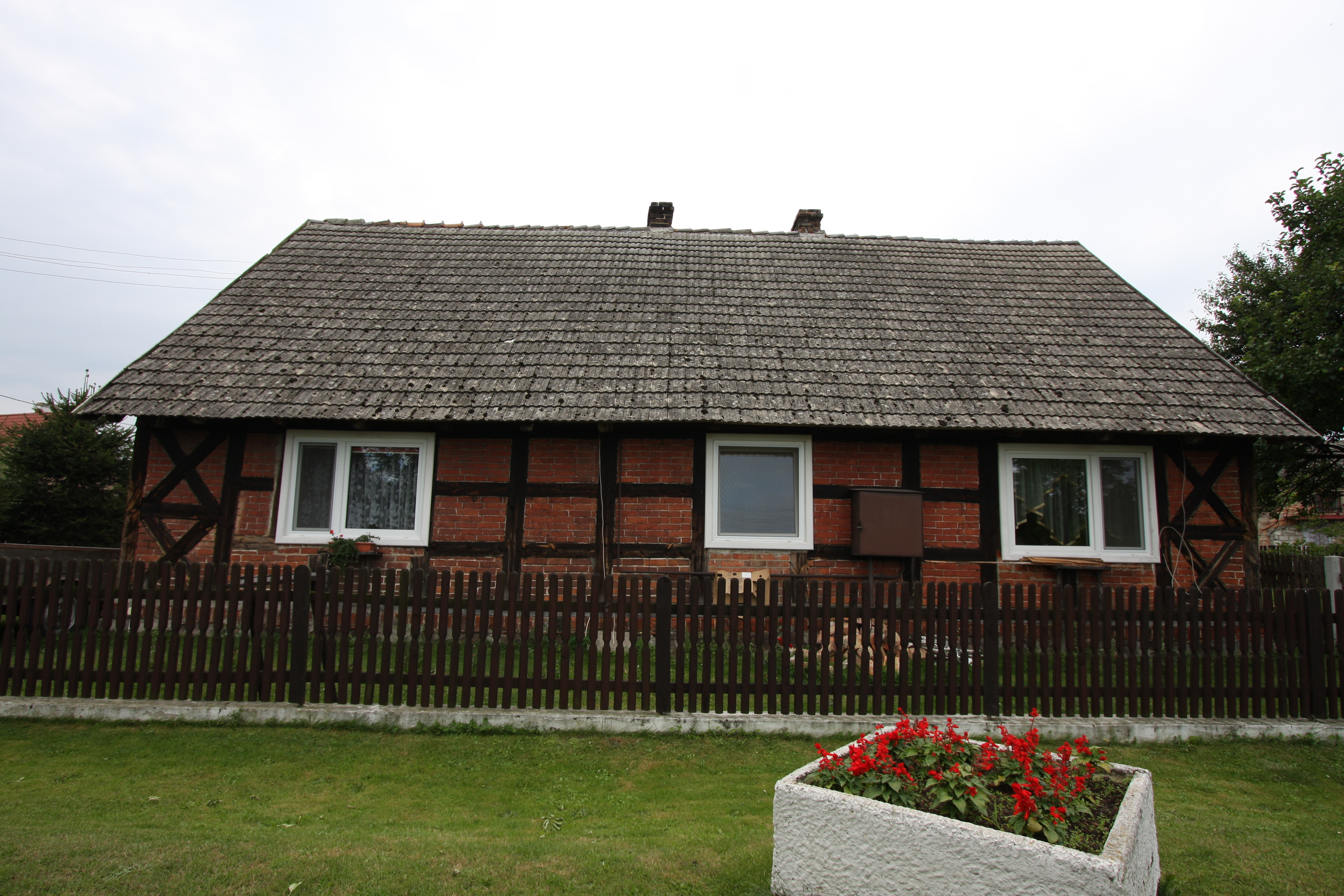
Mid 19th-century timberframe house in Boruja

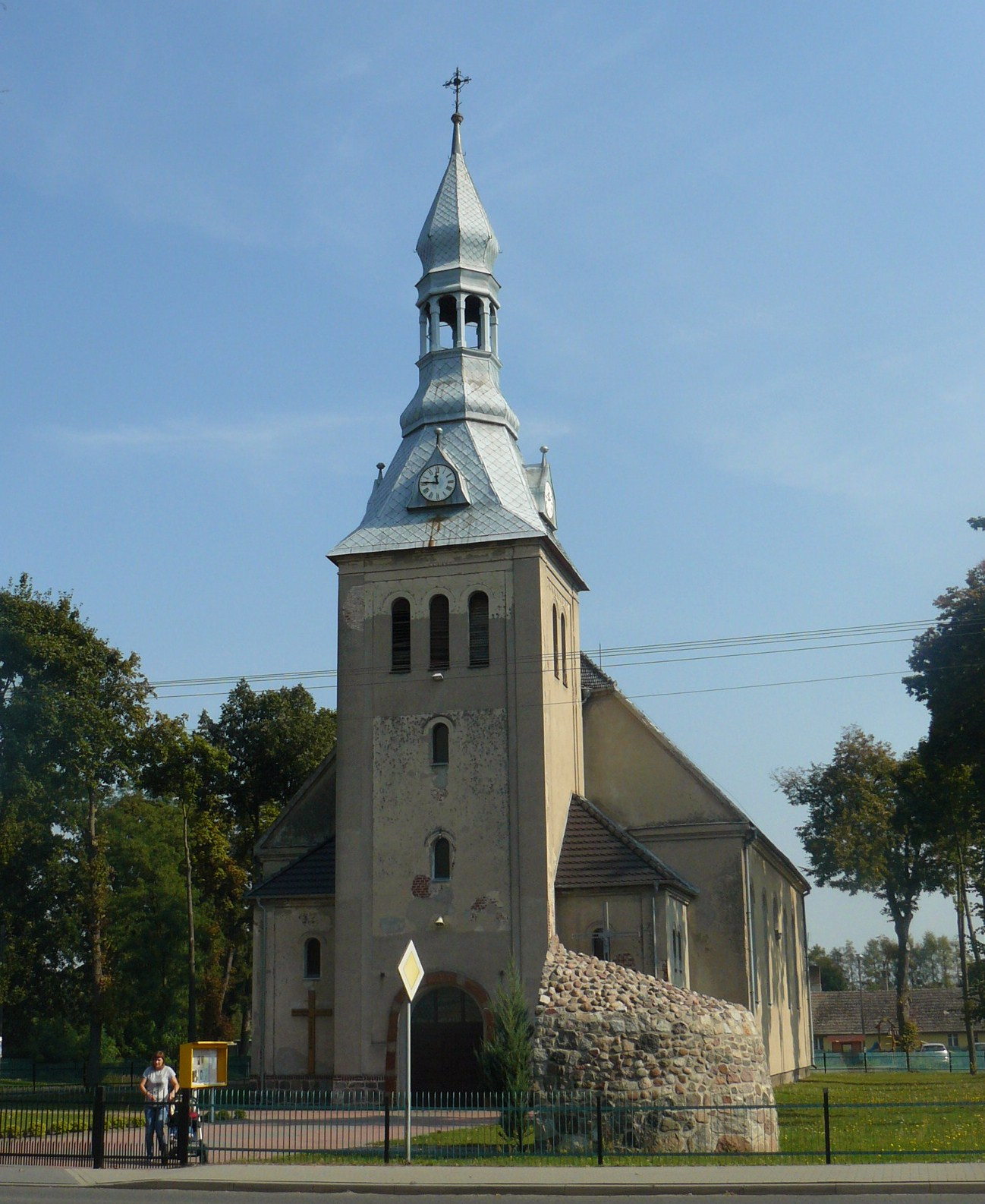
Former Protestant Olęder church in Boruja Kościelna

=== Types ===
Considering the large differences in Olęder colonization in different regions and at different times, it is hard to speak of a single type of village or economic activity. Everything depended on local conditions (the requirements of the terrain and the character of land cleared for sowing or pasture), and the background of the settlers.

In the case of villages on terrain that had been drained, most often one finds buildings constructed in a straight line, with farms located between the river and a road running parallel. Each settler received a thin strip of land located at a right angle to the river or other body of water. If the chief task of the colonists was clearing forest lands, the land owner would designate a specified area, and the settler would choose himself the best place to make a clearing and would situate his farmstead there. This led to the appearance of so-called "zabudowa kolonijna", and in effect the village had a dispersed character.

In the earliest period of settlement, on the fertile soil of Prussia, large and wealthy farms prevailed. In a later period, especially in the valley of the Vistula River, there appeared ever more frequently small, poor and more dispersed farms. As regards the type of buildings, that depended strongly on the ethnicity of the colonists. Szałygin distinguished three types:

- Frisian – farm buildings located under a shared roof, with the residential part set at an angle (for example, in the shape of a cross or of the letter "L")
- German – similar to the case of Frisian farms, the residence and the farm buildings were located under one roof, but in a straight line (one long building, the so-called Langhof)
- Polish – separated residence and farm buildings, scattered around the farm, most often in a quadrilateral.

Górak points out the pros and cons of the Frisian and German types of farm. On the one hand, such placement of the buildings facilitated work and communication, especially in the rainy season or winter, when it was possible to maintain the farm without going outdoors (except to draw water). On the other hand, there is no way to ignore the terrible sanitary conditions and discomfort (especially the stench) resulting from having livestock living so close by.

If the settlers came from the Netherlands, and their task was flood control and draining flooded terrain, they applied certain typical methods of protecting their farms against high water. Buildings were located on an elevated platform, raised using dirt from excavating canals and drainage ponds. In the vicinity, they planted poplars and willows, whose purpose was to stop ice floes in the river during melts. The residential portion of the building was always close to the river, or pointed upstream, so that in case of flood the water would flow first through the residential portion, then through the rest of the farm buildings, and finally spill out onto the fields, which helped to keep the building clean.

In discussing characteristic buildings of the Olęder settlement, one must also mention houses with open passageways on the groundfloor, and windmills (often based on Dutch designs) – the distinguishing contribution of the Dutch and Frisian immigrants to the Polish rural landscape (especially in Żuławy).

=== Legal regulation and village organization ===
Because the Olęder settlement was not monolithic, either with regard to ethnicity, religion or economics, the basic distinguishing characteristic of that type of colonization was the legal conditions regulating both the relationships of the settlement to the broader world and its internal affairs.

==== Legal relations ====
===== Settlement contracts and leases =====
The legal foundation and mark of the beginning of settlement was the settlement "privilege" (also called the "contract" (kontract) or "law" (prawo), which was rendered in Latin as the privilegium or ius, and in German as the Gerichtigkeit), which was issued in the case of a significant majority of settlements. (Note: At times, although rarely, the privilege was substituted with a preliminary agreement, or the parties would decide simply to copy the privilege of another town. Obviously, not all contracts have been preserved to the present.) It usually took a ceremonial and ornamental form, being drawn up on parchment and appropriately stamped with official seals, either placed directly on the document or on cords attached to the document. From a formal legal point of view, this document was not a binding contract, but rather a unilateral declaration expressing the will of the land owner. De facto, however, its contents reflected the agreement of both sides. In this regard, the most important distinguishing factor of olęder settlement is the fact that the second party was not a zasadźca (that is, a figure in medieval Poland who acted as a sort of headman of a village, and intermediary between the land owner and his peasants), but rather the community of settlers acting collectively, or their representative acting on their behalf. The original document remained in the hands of the land owner, although it was often recopied into the appropriate "land book," since the land owner was obligated to produce a duplicate in case the original was lost or destroyed.

Contracts were drawn up in German, Polish or Latin. German or Latin appear most often in Royal Prussia (although contracts in Polish were also found there). The Polish language dominated elsewhere in the Kingdom of Poland. In Greater Poland, around 22% of contracts were written in German, and one can even find contracts written both in German and Polish. Most often contracts were written only at the outset of settlement, although situations did occur—especially in later periods—where a contract's purpose was to recognize legally an already existing situation, such as the rights and relations of settlers already living on the land owner's lands. It also happened that a land owner would extend the new Olęder law to peasants who had been living on given lands for some time.

The contract precisely regulated relations of the Olęder community with the land owner and with other persons and institutions. One basic issue was the conditions on which the settlers were given tenure of lands (dzierżawa). At the beginning of the period of Olęder settlement, land was delivered to the settlers for a specified period, usually from a few dozen to 60 years (although it also occurred that Olęder settlers were given the land only for a few years—as a test period—and if the settlement was successful, the tenure was extended. In later periods, often tenure was turned into emphyteusis, often in perpetuity. (In Roman and civil law, an emphyteusis was a contract by which a landed estate was leased to a tenant, either in perpetuity or for a long term of years, upon the reservation of an annual rent, and upon condition that the lessee should improve the property; the real right by which a person is entitled to enjoy another's estate as if it were his own, and to dispose of its substance, as far as can be done without deteriorating it. This occurred both in cases of extended contracts of tenure, as well as in the founding of new Olęder settlements. (Rusiński gives as an example Olędry Róża, in Greater Poland, settled before 1624). Such tenure was not only perpetual, but also heritable and alienable, although nothing could be done that would harm the interests of the land owner.)

In return for tenure of the land, the settler paid the land owner the so-called wkupne (also called the gottespfenik) (Note: Note that this term had this meaning only in Kuyavia and Royal Prussia; in Greater Poland (Niwka) Gottespfennig at times referred to an obligation to the church.) While in Royal Prussia and Kuyavia the wkupne had to be paid before the first assumption of tenure, and also at each subsequent extension, in Greater Poland Olęder settlers paid the land owner the so-called Gruntgeld only upon converting tenure for a term of years into tenure in perpetuity.

For the use of the land, the community had to pay the land owner an annual rent (czynsz), specified in the settlement contract. (Rent usually were paid only in money; rents in kind were rare outside of Greater Poland). Frequently, at the founding of a settlement, the land owner gave the settlers a few years to get established, foregoing collection of rents during that period (the so-called wolnizna). In only a few cases were Olęder settlers also obligated to provide labor, and even then to a limited degree. (Note: For example, Wąsicki stated that Olęder settlers from Chmielinko every year had to provide two days of labor using horses and oxen, and three days of manual labor.)

===== Personal and legal relationships =====
The Olęder settlers were free persons. They were not dependent upon the land owner, as underscored in the majority of contracts for settling new villages. They could, at any time of their choice, sell their farm and depart the property. The situation is not entirely clear regarding existing inhabitants of a village to which the Olęder law was subsequently extended. For example, the inhabitants of Olędrów Chorzępowa, on the Sieraków estate, theoretically could sell their farms (and perhaps depart the property), but the settlement contract did not clearly describe them as free people, and an inventory of the estate made a few years later counts some of the farmers as serfs.

Minor judicial matters generally were tried before the local government of the Olęder community. However, the land owner reserved the right to hear the matter himself in the case of serious crimes (robbery, arson, murder, assault causing bodily harm, etc.) The land owner's court was also the court of review for appeals from the decision of the community. That legal arrangement placed the Olęder settler on a somewhat higher level than an enserfed peasant, who did not have access to community justice. Only rarely were Olędrzy without the right to settle any legal questions. Such was the case on Saska Kępa, where only the mayor and the land owner's clerk were entitled to judge disputes.

On royal estates, in case of a conflict with the starosta in charge of administering the estate for the king, the Olędrzy could appeal to the royal referendary court (sąd referendarski), a right which they invoked frequently. In the case of noble estates, nothing is known regarding the regulatory conditions allowing appeal from decisions of the land owner. However, almost certainly the Olędrzy had the capacity on their own initiative to file a complaint in the civic and land courts (urzęd grodzki i ziemski), in contrast to serfs who could file such a complaint only in the presence of the land owner himself.

===== Faith, public and religious obligations =====
Olęder settlers identified with different Christian sects. This is the case both with the first colonists, from the Netherlands and Frisia (most often Anabaptists and Mennonites), and with the later, ethnically different peasants (Lutherans and Roman Catholics). In general, they enjoyed freedom of religion, which after all was one of the reasons for the original Dutch colonization. The great majority of settlement contracts contained the limitation that the settlers were not allowed to prevent Catholic laborers they employed from participating in Holy Mass or other church visits. Only rarely did a founder interfere with the colonists' freedom to carry out their own religious observances (for example, the Warsaw authorities not only prohibited the Olędrzy from building a Protestant church, but also from holding services, either privately or publicly. They were required to participate in Catholic services.).

Even if an Olęder settlement was populated by non-Catholic peasants, most often the settlement was within the jurisdiction of Catholic Church administration. Consequently, both Catholics and Lutherans were required to make certain payments (in return for which, Lutherans were, in certain situations, authorized to use the services of Catholic priests). Olędrzy paid tithes or meszne, a payment for saying Mass, often made in kind but sometimes in money, and paid by all inhabitants in a parish (it was rare for both tithes and meszne to have to be paid), as well as payments for specific services (performing baptisms, marriages, burials, etc.) These were paid to the Roman Catholic Church by Lutherans even if the service was performed by a Protestant chaplain, and was treated as compensation for the reduction in Church finances. Payments for these things to the Roman Catholic Church were only abolished in 1768, when the Cardinal Laws equalized the legal rights of Catholics and dissenters.

Like other peasants, Olędrzy were also required to pay certain taxes to the state (and only rarely did the land owner take that responsibility upon himself, and in those cases he may have compensated himself through higher rents). These included taxes levied per capita or per hearth, having to provide winter quarters for soldiers, and other taxes (such as those on hides or the subsidium charitativum).

==== Organization ====
===== Local self-government =====
Strong self-government was one of the most fundamental distinguishing characteristics of Olęder settlement, even though there were cases where the land owner attempted to limit it (by trying to appoint a hereditary sołtys, who was a dependant of the manor), in which case the community's system of local government was closer to that of villages founded under the German Law. Most often, however, the manor respected the rights of the community granted in the settlement contract.

The local government of the community consisted of the sołtys and his councillors, each called a ławnik. Most often there were two of these, rarely three and extremely seldom four.). They were not appointed by the land owner, but chosen by all the inhabitants of the settlement (although women did not have the right to vote). Local government elections were usually held annually. At times the term of office lasted two or three years. Election to an office for life was truly exceptional. (Note: Rusiński gives the example of Radoszkowo Olędrów and Uścikowiec Olędrów; in the first, the sołtys was named for life; in the second, the entire community leadership was named for life.)

On the one hand, local officials served as intermediaries between the settlement and the manor. They were directly responsible for ensuring complete and punctual fulfillment of the obligations owed to the manor, such as collecting a delivering payments and rents to the land owner. On the other hand, the sołtys and councillors managed the administration of the community and its judicial system. This was most often regulated by administrative ordinances (wilkierz), which frequently were also spelled out in the settlement contract. The legal content of these had the objective of regulating relations among the peasants, which was especially important in the context of the shared responsibility of the community to fulfill the obligations toward the land owner contained in the contract. For example, the officials of the local government were even required to remove an Olęder who neglected his land and settle somebody else there. The local government was also responsible for the care of minor orphans, with security (especially against fires) and cleanliness of the settlement.

At the same time, the sołtys and councillors acted as the court of first instance for minor infractions and arguments. For all of these actions, local officials received payment from the community. Income from payments was placed in the community chest, kept by the sołtys (and keys to which were held by the councillors). Funds from the community chest were used, among other things, to cover the travel costs of jury members, as well, perhaps, as payment to a community shepherd, a night watchman, a teacher or the cost of insuring against fire.

===== Schools =====
An important distinguishing characteristic of non-Catholic Olęder settlements was the existence on their terrains of schools. Above all, these fulfilled a religious function, preparing youth to join the community of faith. Rusiński even doubts whether anything other than the catechism was taught in some schools.

The school generally was located in its own building, to the construction of which the land owner agreed in the settlement contract. He also facilitated upkeep of the school by designating for it a specified area of land free of rents. For example, in Chmielinko the settlers received one-half of a huba for the school. The teacher cultivated that land, although he often also received additional contributions from the community. His duties included providing instruction in religion, and how to participate in the religion's rituals, and teaching reading, writing and arithmetic. The community sometimes took advantage of the teacher's knowledge of how to write to perform certain tasks associated with administration of the settlement: maintaining the community's records and the local government's correspondence. Surely, the teacher also sometimes acted as scribe for the personal correspondence of the peasants.

It is difficult to assess the quality of instruction in the Olęder schools. In Rusiński's opinion, the manner of recruiting teachers in Olęder settlements in Greater Poland—from among weavers, innkeepers, shoekeepers or tailors in small towns who could not find work—is proof that the quality cannot have been very high. At the same time, he recognized that the fact of these schools' existence was an undeniable benefit to the community. In turn, Szałygin indicated that, for the settlers from the Netherlands the schools were a safeguard for their language, culture, traditions and Mennonite faith, which allowed them to keep their own identity and resist Polonization. However, after the partitions of Poland, Prussian policy led to their Germanization.

== Impact ==
Studies thoroughly analyzing the effects of the Olęder settlement on the Polish economy are lacking. Researchers have treated the topic summarily. For example, Rusiński limits himself to the claim that, "as an economic phenomenon, the settlement must undoubtedly be assessed positively." In turn, Szałygin points out that "their farms were characterized by a significantly higher efficiency, modernization and better organization of work than the farms of enserfed peasants. Precisely defining the effects of this type of colonisation is even more difficult because so far no studies have appeared that encompass the entire territory of the Polish–Lithuanian Commonwealth, from Ducal Prussia, through Kuyavia, Mazovia and Greater Poland to the area around Lublin. The fullest and richest work remains that of Rusiński, published in 1947, and which deals only with Greater Poland.

However, there is no doubt—as proved by the willingness of land owners to grant settlement contracts to additional villages—that the Olęder settlement phenomenon had positive effects on the Polish rural economy, in two ways. First, the arrival of the colonists from the Netherlands and Friesland, with their centuries of experience in cultivating difficult floodplains, gave a push to development of Polish agriculture and livestock breeding. Second, land owners received higher incomes thanks to the higher efficiency and economic skill of free persons.

== See also ==
- Bambers
- Dutch people in Poland
- Evangelical Church, Nekielka (Poland)
- History of the Germans in Poland
- Vistula delta Mennonites
- Vistula Germans
- Walddeutsche
- Germans in Ukraine
