= Zębowo =

Zębowo may refer to the following places:

- Zębowo, Greater Poland Voivodeship (west-central Poland)
- Zębowo, Kuyavian-Pomeranian Voivodeship (north-central Poland)
- Zębowo, Pomeranian Voivodeship (north Poland)
