= Flajolet =

Flajolet is a surname. Notable people with the surname include:

- André Flajolet (born 1946), French politician
- Philippe Flajolet (1948–2011), French computer scientist
