= Zenon Grocholewski =

Polish Catholic cardinal (1939–2020)

His Eminence Zenon Grocholewski
- Prefect Emeritus of the Congregation for Catholic Education
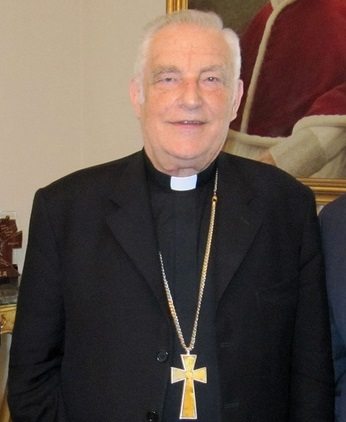
- Appointed: 15 November 1999
- Term ended: 31 March 2015
- Predecessor: Pio Laghi
- Successor: Giuseppe Versaldi
- Other post: Cardinal Priest of San Nicola in Carcere (2001–2020)
- Previous posts: Titular Archbishop of Acropolis (1982–2001); Secretary of the Apostolic Signatura (1982–1998); Prefect of the Apostolic Signatura (1998–1999)

Orders
- Ordination: 27 May 1963 by Antoni Baraniak
- Consecration: 6 January 1983 by Pope John Paul II
- Created cardinal: 21 February 2001 by Pope John Paul II
- Rank: Cardinal priest

Personal details
- Born: Zenon Grocholewski; 11 October 1939 Bródki, Poland
- Died: 17 July 2020 (aged 80) Rome, Italy
- Denomination: Roman Catholic
- Motto: Illum oportet crescere ('He must increase', John 3:30)

Styles of Zenon Grocholewski
- Reference style: His Eminence
- Spoken style: Your Eminence
- Informal style: Cardinal
- See: Acropolis (titular)

Zenon Grocholewski (11 October 1939 – 17 July 2020) was a Polish prelate of the Catholic Church, who was elevated to the rank of cardinal in 2001. He joined the Roman Curia in 1972 and served from 1999 until 2015 as Prefect of the Congregation for Catholic Education and Grand Chancellor of the Pontifical Gregorian University.

== Biography ==
Zenon Grocholewski was born in Bródki to Stanisław and Józefa (née Stawińska) Grocholewski. After studying at the archdiocesan seminary of Poznań, Grocholewski was ordained to the priesthood on 27 May 1963 by Archbishop Antoni Baraniak.

He joined the staff of the Apostolic Signatura in 1972. On 21 December 1982 he was appointed titular bishop of Acropolis, and he received his episcopal consecration on the following 6 January from Pope John Paul II, with Archbishops Eduardo Martínez Somalo and Duraisamy Lourdusamy serving as co-consecrators. John Paul promoted Grocholewski to the rank of Archbishop on 16 December 1991. On 15 November 1999, John Paul appointed him Prefect of the Congregation for Catholic Education. That position made him ex officio Grand Chancellor of the Pontifical Gregorian University.

Grocholewski was created Cardinal-Deacon of San Nicola in Carcere by John Paul II in the consistory of 21 January 2001. Grocholewski automatically lost his curial position on 2 April 2005 upon the death of Pope John Paul. He was confirmed in office by Pope Benedict XVI on 21 April. He was one of the cardinal electors who participated in the 2005 papal conclave that elected Pope Benedict XVI. On 21 February 2011, he opted for the order of Cardinal Priest, with his former diaconal church elevated to the level of cardinalitial title. He participated in the 2013 papal conclave that elected Pope Francis.

Grocholewski was a member of the Congregation for the Doctrine of the Faith, the Congregation for Bishops, the Pontifical Council for Legislative Texts, and the Special Council for Oceania of the Synod of Bishops. Cardinal Grocholewski was also the papal envoy to the ceremonies marking the 400th anniversary of the founding of the Pontifical and Royal University of Santo Tomas in Manila, the oldest university in Asia.

On 31 March 2015, Pope Francis appointed Cardinal Giuseppe Versaldi to succeed Grocholewski as Prefect of the Congregation for Catholic Education.

Zenon Grocholewski died on 17 July 2020 at the age of 80.

== Academic career ==
Grocholewski taught at the Faculty of Canon Law of the Pontifical Gregorian University in Rome (1975–1999) and at the Faculty of Canon Law of the Pontifical Lateran University in Rome (1980–1984). He also gave lectures on Administrative Justice at the Studio Rotale of the Roman Rota (1986–1998). The list of his publications ran to 550 entries.

He gave talks at conferences and conventions in various countries. He was connected with a number of Canon Law associations, and with the editorial boards of some academic reviews and journals.

== Prefect of the Congregation for Catholic Education ==
In March 2011 at a press conference to present the newly published Decree on the Reform of Ecclesiastical Studies of Philosophy, Cardinal Grocholewski explained how the normative documents concerning ecclesiastical studies comprehended John Paul II's 1979 Apostolic Constitution "Sapientia christiana" and its norms of application, issued in the same year by the Congregation for Catholic Education. "Nonetheless", he said, "'Ecclesia semper est reformanda' in order to respond to the new demands of ecclesial life in changing historical-cultural circumstances and this also (perhaps especially) involves the academic world". The reasons for the reform, the cardinal explained, are "on the one hand, the shortcomings in philosophical formation at many ecclesiastical institutions, where precise points of reference are lacking especially as regards the subjects to be taught and the quality of teachers.... On the other hand there is the conviction – expressed in John Paul II's 1998 Encyclical Fides et ratio of the importance of the metaphysical component of philosophy, ... and the awareness that philosophy is indispensable for theological formation". For this reason today's decree of the congregation aims to re-evaluate philosophy, above all in the light of that Encyclical, ... restoring the 'original vocation' of philosophy; i.e., the search for truth and its sapiental and metaphysical dimension".

== Honours, awards and decorations ==
Cardinal Grocholewski received more than 20 honorary Doctorates, the Grand Medal of San Gorazdo of the Ministry of Education of Slovakia (2000), the Grand Cross of the Order of Merit (Chile) (2003), the Grand Cross of Merit with Star and Sash of the Order of Merit of the Federal Republic of Germany (2005), the Commander's Cross with Star of the Order of Polonia Restituta (2009), and Commander of l’Ordre des Palmes académiques of the Ministry of Education of the Republic of France (2009).

- Order of Merit (Chile), Grand Cross (2003)
- Order of Merit of the Federal Republic of Germany, Grand Cross of Merit with Star and Sash (2005)
- Order of Polonia Restituta, Commander's Cross with Star (2009)
- Ordre des Palmes Académiques (France), Commandeur (2009)

Catholic Church titles
| Preceded by Aurelio Sabattani | Secretary of the Apostolic Signatura; 21 December 1982 – 5 October 1998 | Succeeded by Francesco Saverio Salerno |
| Previous: New* | Titular Bishop of Agropoli; 21 December 1982 – 16 December 1991 | see promoted to archbishopric |
| see promoted from bishopric | Titular Archbishop of Agropoli; 16 December 1991 – 21 February 2001 | Succeeded by Marc Ouellet |
| Preceded by Ugo Poletti | President of the Commission for Advocates; 5 October 1998 – 15 November 1999 | Succeeded by Mario Francesco Pompedda |
| Preceded by Gilberto Agustoni | Prefect of the Apostolic Signatura; 5 October 1998 – 15 November 1999 | Succeeded by Mario Francesco Pompedda |
| Preceded by Pío Laghi | Prefect of the Congregation for Catholic Education; 15 November 1999 – 31 March 2015 | Succeeded by Giuseppe Versaldi |
| Preceded by Aloys Grillmeier | Cardinal-Deacon of San Nicola in Carcere; 21 February 2001 – 21 February 2011 | deanery promoted to titular church |
| deanery promoted to titular church | Cardinal-Priest pro hac vice of San Nicola in Carcere; 21 February 2011 – 17 July 2020 | Succeeded by Silvano Maria Tomasi |
