= Pas-de-Calais's 9th constituency =

Constituency of the National Assembly of France

9th constituency of the Pas-de-Calais
- inline Constituency of the National Assembly of France

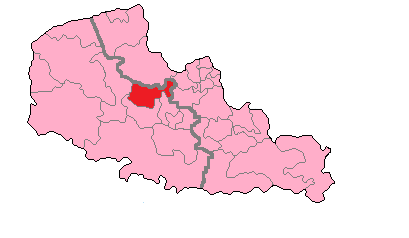
- Pas-de-Calais' 9th constituency shown within Nord-Pas-de-Calais
- Deputy: Caroline Parmentier; RN
- Department: Pas-de-Calais
- Cantons: Béthune-Est, Béthune-Nord, Béthune-Sud, Laventie, Lillers
- Registered voters: 79,278

The 9th constituency of the Pas-de-Calais is a French legislative constituency in the Pas-de-Calais département.

== Description ==
Pas-de-Calais' 9th constituency is composed of the town of Béthune in the north of the department.

From 1988 the seat has been held by six parties, three from the centre left (the Radical Party of the Left, the Socialist Party and the Citizen and Republican Movement), one from the centre (MoDem), one from the conservative right (the UMP), and one from the far-right (RN). The seat has been won by five different parties in the five elections in the 21st century.

Mayor of Béthune Stéphane Saint-Andre narrowly won the seat at the 2012 elections becoming one of thirteen PRG representatives in the National Assembly.

== Historic Representation ==
| Election | Member | Party |
|---|---|---|
| 1986 | Proportional representation - no election by constituency | |
| 1988 | Jacques Mellick | PS |
| 1993 | Jacques Mellick | PS |
| 1997 | Jacques Mellick | PS |
| 2002 | Bernard Seux | MDC |
| 2007 | André Flajolet | UMP |
| 2012 | Stéphane Saint-Andre | PRG |
| 2017 | Marguerite Deprez-Audebert | MoDem |
| 2022 | Caroline Parmentier | RN |
| 2024 | Caroline Parmentier | RN |

== Election results ==
=== 2024 ===
| Candidate | Party | Alliance | First round | | | Second round | | |
| Candidate | Party | Alliance | Votes | % | +/– | Votes | % | +/– |
|---|---|---|---|---|---|---|---|---|
| Caroline Parmentier | RN | | 25,674 | 48.85 | +18.07 | 27,318 | 54.64 | +1.33 |
| Hadrien Coisne | RE | Ensemble | 10,394 | 19.78 | -3.12 | 22,674 | 45.36 | -1.33 |
| Estelle Harremoes | PS | NFP | 8,881 | 16.90 | +0.92 | | | |
| Hakim Elzaouzi | UDI | | 6,985 | 13.29 | +3.67 | | | |
| Anne-Marie Deflandre | LO | | 624 | 1.19 | +0.36 | | | |
| Julien Guaquier | DVD | | 0 | 0.00 | -0.51 | | | |
| Votes | | | 52,558 | 100.00 | | 49,992 | 100.00 | |
| Valid votes | | | 52,558 | 97.18 | -0.29 | 49,992 | 94.87 | +2.61 |
| Blank votes | | | 1,009 | 1.87 | +0.18 | 1,764 | 3.35 | -1.83 |
| Null votes | | | 514 | 0.95 | +0.11 | 938 | 1.78 | -0.79 |
| Turnout | | | 54,081 | 66.96 | +18.73 | 52,694 | 65.24 | +18.08 |
| Abstentions | | | 26,681 | 33.04 | -18.73 | 28,079 | 34.76 | -18.08 |
| Registered voters | | | 80,762 | | | 80,773 | | |
| Result | | | RN HOLD | | | | | |

=== 2022 ===
Legislative Election 2022: Pas-de-Calais's 9th constituency
| Party | Candidate | Votes | % | ±% |
|---|---|---|---|---|
| RN | Caroline Parmentier | 11,596 | 30.78 | +9.34 |
| MoDem (Ensemble) | Marguerite Deprez-Audebert | 8,626 | 22.90 | -5.18 |
| LFI (NUPÉS) | Amandine Bonifacio | 6,021 | 15.98 | −1.57 |
| UDI (UDC) | Hakim Elazouzi | 3,622 | 9.62 | −3.03 |
| FGR | Stéphane Saint-André | 2,913 | 7.73 | N/A |
| REC | Fanny Judek | 1,032 | 2.74 | N/A |
| DVE | Abdellah Baik | 776 | 2.06 | N/A |
| Others | N/A | 3,083 | 8.18 | |
| Turnout | | 37,669 | 48.23 | −2.22 |
2nd round result
| RN | Caroline Parmentier | 18,587 | 53.31 | +10.97 |
| MoDem (Ensemble) | Marguerite Deprez-Audebert | 16,279 | 46.69 | −10.97 |
| Turnout | | 34,866 | 47.16 | +2.11 |
| RN gain from MoDem | | | | |

=== 2017 ===
| Candidate | Label | First round | | Second round | |
| Candidate | Label | Votes | % | Votes | % |
|---|---|---|---|---|---|
| Marguerite Deprez-Audebert | MoDem | 10,903 | 28.08 | 18,451 | 57.66 |
| Jacques Delaire | FN | 8,325 | 21.44 | 13,548 | 42.34 |
| Pierre-Emmanuel Gibson | LR | 4,912 | 12.65 | | |
| Stéphane Saint-André | PRG | 4,623 | 11.90 | | |
| Bruno Dubout | FI | 4,561 | 11.74 | | |
| Alain Delannoy | DVG | 1,552 | 4.00 | | |
| Bruno Westrelin | PCF | 1,217 | 3.13 | | |
| Marie-Andrée Queste | ECO | 1,042 | 2.68 | | |
| Sebastien Hochart | DLF | 759 | 1.95 | | |
| Anne-Marie Deflandre | EXG | 350 | 0.90 | | |
| Julien Guaquier | DIV | 213 | 0.55 | | |
| Abdellah Baik | ECO | 200 | 0.52 | | |
| Matthieu Beaufromé | DIV | 177 | 0.46 | | |
| Votes | | 38,834 | 100.00 | 31,999 | 100.00 |
| Valid votes | | 38,834 | 97.35 | 31,999 | 89.82 |
| Blank votes | | 708 | 1.77 | 2,355 | 6.61 |
| Null votes | | 351 | 0.88 | 1,273 | 3.57 |
| Turnout | | 39,893 | 50.45 | 35,627 | 45.05 |
| Abstentions | | 39,178 | 49.55 | 43,451 | 54.95 |
| Registered voters | | 79,071 | | 79,078 | |
Source: Ministry of the Interior

=== 2012 ===
Legislative Election 2012: Pas-de-Calais's 9th constituency
| Party | Candidate | Votes | % | ±% |
|---|---|---|---|---|
| UMP | André Flajolet | 13,702 | 30.21 | −8.30 |
| PRG | Stéphane Saint-Andre | 10,159 | 22.40 | N/A |
| FN | Aurélia Beigneux | 7,658 | 16.88 | +12.49 |
| DVG | Alain Delannoy | 4,929 | 10.87 | N/A |
| FG | Pascal Barois | 3,526 | 7.77 | −1.38 |
| DVG | Daniel Boys | 3,370 | 7.43 | N/A |
| Others | N/A | 2,010 | | |
| Turnout | | 45,354 | 57.21 | −6.43 |
2nd round result
| PRG | Stéphane Saint-Andre | 21,509 | 50.83 | N/A |
| UMP | André Flajolet | 20,807 | 49.17 | −2.59 |
| Turnout | | 42,316 | 53.38 | −12.09 |
| PRG gain from UMP | | | | |

=== 2007 ===
Legislative Election 2007: Pas-de-Calais's 9th constituency
| Party | Candidate | Votes | % | ±% |
|---|---|---|---|---|
| UMP | André Flajolet | 19,307 | 38.51 | |
| PS | Jacques Mellick | 15,961 | 31.84 | |
| PCF | Lucien Andries | 4,589 | 9.15 | |
| FN | Evelyne Geronnez | 2,201 | 4.39 | |
| DIV | Marcel Trolle | 1,856 | 3.70 | |
| LV | Anne Ecuyer | 1,496 | 2.98 | |
| CPNT | Didier Chappe | 1,379 | 2.75 | |
| Far left | Philippe Mussat | 1,064 | 2.12 | |
| Others | N/A | 2,280 | | |
| Turnout | | 51,499 | 63.64 | |
2nd round result
| UMP | André Flajolet | 25,841 | 51.76 | |
| PS | Jacques Mellick | 24,080 | 48.24 | |
| Turnout | | 52,977 | 65.47 | |
| UMP hold | | | | |

=== 2002 ===
Legislative Election 2002: Pas-de-Calais's 9th constituency
| Party | Candidate | Votes | % | ±% |
|---|---|---|---|---|
| UMP | André Flajolet | 15,213 | 29.96 | |
| PS | Marie-Noelle Lienemann | 14,625 | 28.80 | |
| PR | Bernard Seux | 5,120 | 10.08 | |
| FN | Evelyne Geronnez | 5,107 | 10.06 | |
| PCF | Lucien Andries | 4,803 | 9.46 | |
| CPNT | Jean-Pierre Meresse | 1,373 | 2.70 | |
| LV | Joel Caron | 1,187 | 2.34 | |
| DVD | Anne-Marie Duez | 1,020 | 2.01 | |
| Others | N/A | 2,337 | | |
| Turnout | | 52,320 | 65.68 | |
2nd round result
| UMP | André Flajolet | 24,525 | 50.54 | |
| PS | Marie-Noelle Lienemann | 24,003 | 49.46 | |
| Turnout | | 51,745 | 64.96 | |
| UMP hold | | | | |

=== 1997 ===
Legislative Election 1997: Pas-de-Calais's 9th constituency
| Party | Candidate | Votes | % | ±% |
|---|---|---|---|---|
| PS | Bernard Seux | 17,918 | 34.09 | |
| UDF | Jean-Pierre Deruelle | 9,578 | 18.22 | |
| PCF | Lucien Andries | 8,513 | 16.19 | |
| FN | Marcos Cantola Iradi | 5,797 | 11.03 | |
| DIV | Marie-France Deleflie | 5,761 | 10.96 | |
| LO | Marie-Danièle Duquenne | 2,180 | 4.15 | |
| LV | Serge Pacheka | 1,628 | 3.10 | |
| MEI | Michel Hecquet | 1,193 | 2.27 | |
| Turnout | | 55,709 | 73.01 | |
2nd round result
| PS | Bernard Seux | 32,943 | 64.91 | |
| UDF | Jean-Pierre Deruelle | 17,806 | 35.09 | |
| Turnout | | 55,439 | 72.66 | |
| PS hold | | | | |

== Sources ==
- Official results of French elections from 1998: "Résultats électoraux officiels en France" (in French).
