= Linie =

Linie may refer to:

- Linie, Greater Poland Voivodeship
- Linie, West Pomeranian Voivodeship
