= Audebert =

Audebert is a French surname. Notable people with the surname include:

- Alexandre Audebert (born 1977), French rugby union player
- Jean-Baptiste Audebert (1759–1800), French artist and naturalist

== See also ==
- Marguerite Deprez-Audebert (born 1952), French politician
