= Gilberto Agustoni =

Swiss Catholic prelate

His Eminence Servant of God Gilberto Agustoni
- Prefect Emeritus of the Apostolic Signatura
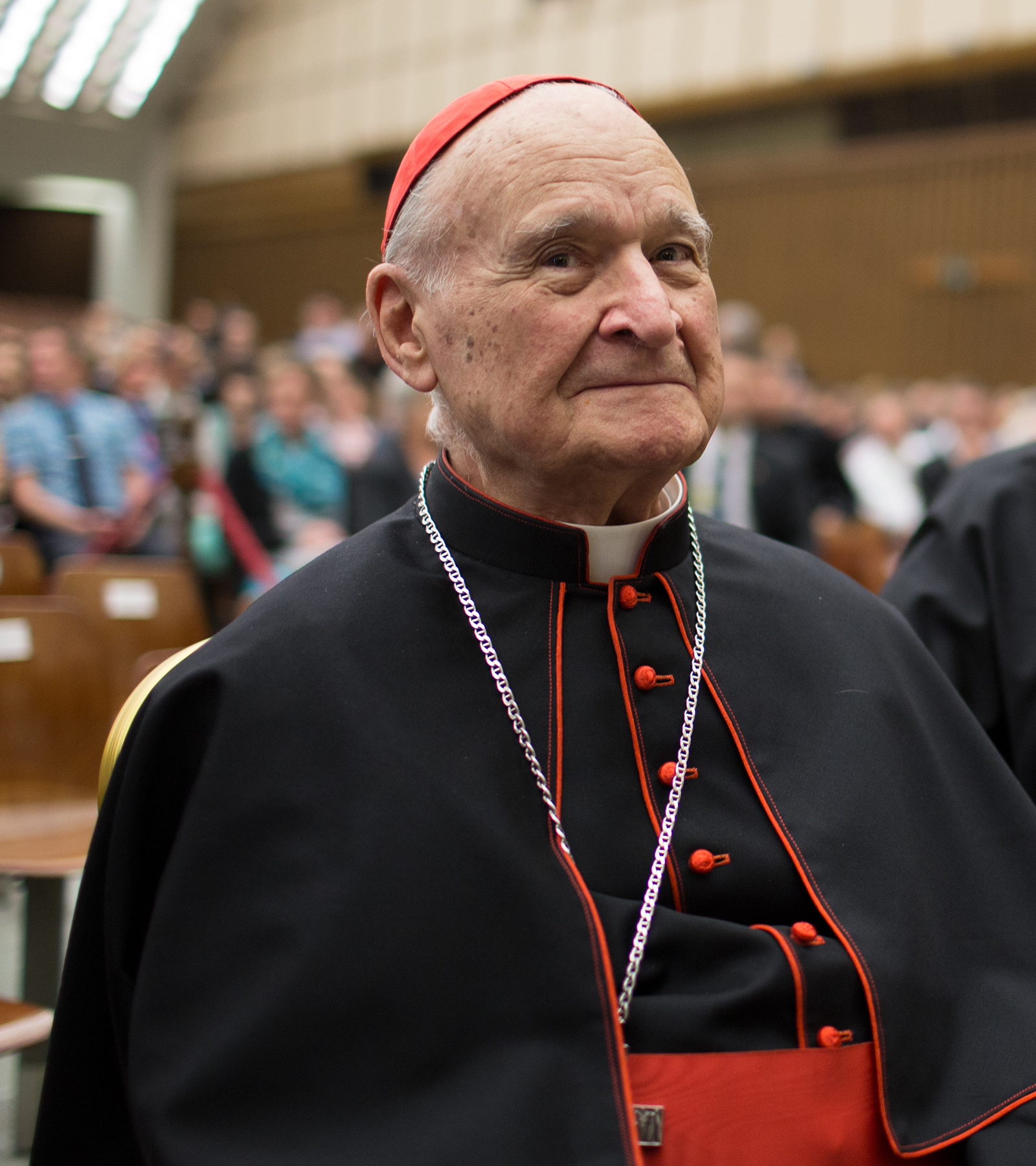
- See: Santi Urbano e Lorenzo a Prima Porta
- Appointed: 26 November 1994
- Term ended: 5 October 1998
- Predecessor: Achille Silvestrini
- Successor: Zenon Grocholewski
- Other post: Cardinal-Priest of Santi Urbano e Lorenzo a Prima Porta
- Previous posts: Titular Bishop of Caprulae (1986–1994); Secretary of the Congregation for the Clergy (1986–1992); Pro-Prefect of the Apostolic Signatura (1992–1994); Cardinal-Deacon of Santi Urbano e Lorenzo a Prima Porta (1994–2005)

Orders
- Ordination: 20 April 1946
- Consecration: 6 January 1987 by Pope John Paul II
- Created cardinal: 26 November 1994 by Pope John Paul II
- Rank: Cardinal-Deacon (1994-2005); Cardinal-Priest (2005-2017)

Personal details
- Born: Gilberto Agustoni; 26 July 1922 Schaffhausen, Switzerland
- Died: 13 January 2017 (aged 94) Rome, Italy
- Denomination: Roman Catholic
- Motto: christus spes gloriae
- Coat of arms

Sainthood
- Title as Saint: Servant of God

Styles of Gilberto Agustoni
- Reference style: His Eminence
- Spoken style: Your Eminence
- Informal style: Cardinal

Gilberto Agustoni (26 July 1922 – 13 January 2017) was a Swiss prelate of the Catholic Church. He worked in the Roman Curia from 1950 to 1998, ending his career as head of the Apostolic Signatura from 1992 to 1998. He became a cardinal in 1994.

== Early life ==
Agustoni was born in Schaffhausen, Switzerland, and had four brothers and one sister. Two of his brothers were also priests. Their mother came from a village on the shores of Lake Constance, and their father was a civil servant. He was educated at the Seminary of Lugano. He studied in Rome for a year, earning a degree in philosophy. Because of World War II, he continued his studies at the University of Fribourg, where he completed a degree in sacred theology. Bishop Angelo Jelmini ordained him in Lugano on 20 April 1946.

Agustoni later studied at the Pontifical University of Saint Thomas Aquinas, Angelicum and the Pontifical Lateran University in Rome, where he earned a licentiate in theology and law.

== Roman Curia appointments ==
In 1950, Cardinal Alfredo Ottaviani asked Jelmini to allow Agustoni, whom he had met on several occasions, to work in the Congregation for the Doctrine of the Faith (CDF) while continuing his studies. Agustoni began his service there on 1 July 1950, an exceptional appointment for someone under the age of 30. He became the head of a department at the CDF and later commissioner at the Congregation for the Discipline of the Sacraments. Following the Second Vatican Council, he helped to coordinate the curial departments engaged in Pope Paul VI's program of liturgical renewal. In May 1970, he became a Prelate Auditor of the Tribunal of the Roman Rota.

On 18 December 1986, Pope John Paul II appointed Agustoni Titular Archbishop of Caprulae and Secretary of the Congregation for the Clergy. On 2 April 1992, he was appointed Pro-Prefect of Apostolic Signatura, becoming Prefect when created Cardinal-Deacon of Santi Urbano e Lorenzo a Prima Porta on 26 November 1994.

He resigned his post on 5 October 1998. In early 2005, he took the option, open to Cardinal-Deacons after ten years, of becoming a Cardinal-Priest. Agustoni died on 13 January 2017, aged 94.

== Ottaviani Intervention ==
He was secretary to Ottaviani at the time of the Ottaviani Intervention. Jean Madiran, a critic of the reforms of Vatican II and founder-editor of the French journal Itinéraires, claimed that this letter was fraudulently presented to the elderly and already blind cardinal for his signature by his secretary Agustoni, and that Agustoni resigned shortly afterwards. The cardinal himself never publicly confirmed this story. Agustoni resigned as Ottaviani's secretary in 1970 to join the Ecclesiastical Magistrature as Prelate Auditor of the Tribunal of the Roman Rota, and there is no evidence to suggest his departure was anything more than a routine change of assignment. Furthermore, Madiran admits that he was not in the room to see this alleged deception of Ottaviani.

Catholic Church titles
Preceded by Achille Silvestrini	Prefect of the Supreme Tribunal of the Apostolic Signatura; 2 April 1992 – 5 October 1998	Succeeded by Zenon Grocholewski
