= Caroline Parmentier =

French politician (born 1965)

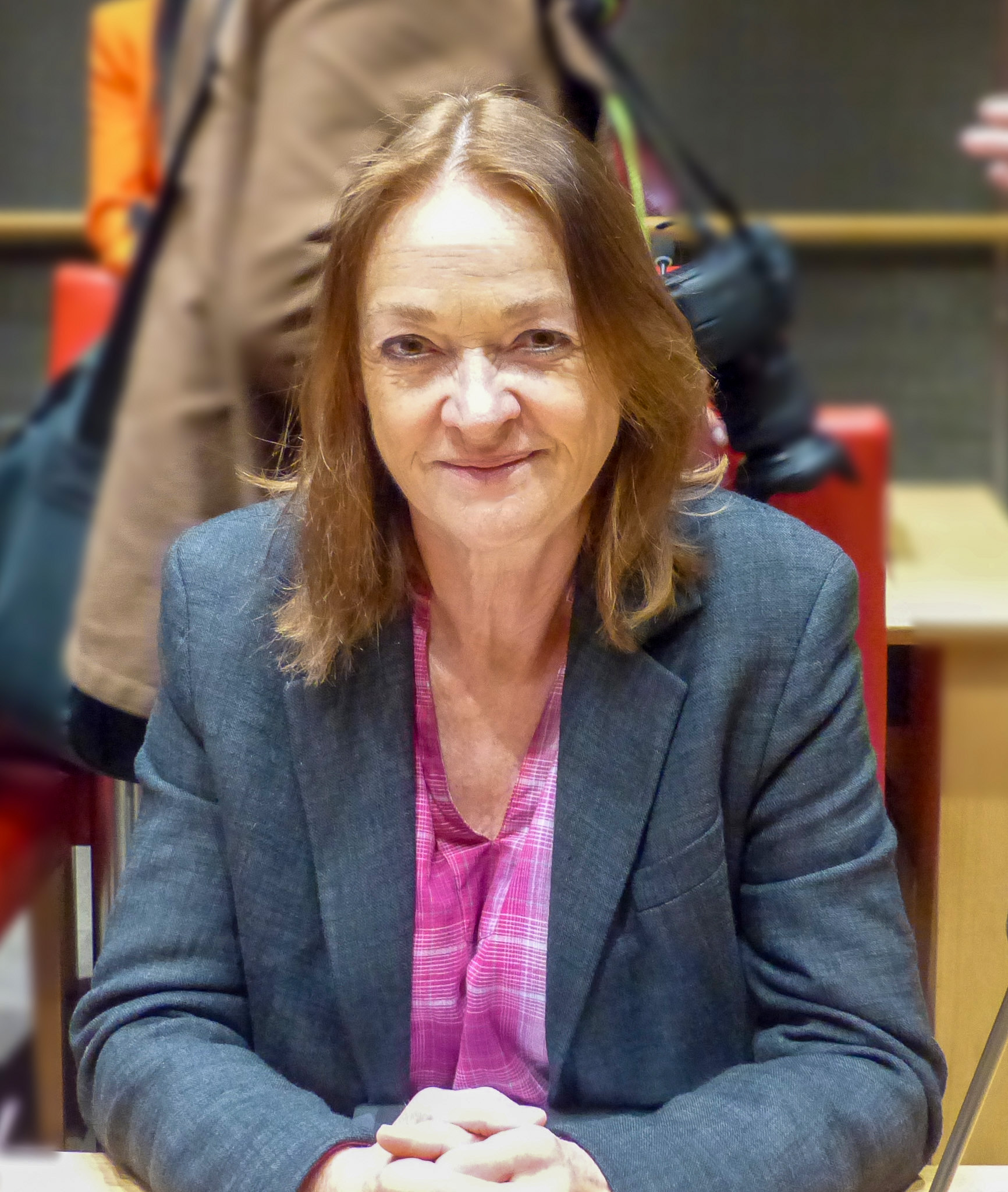

Member of the National Assembly for Pas-de-Calais's 9th constituency
- In office 22 June 2022 – 9 June 2024
- Preceded by: Marguerite Deprez-Audebert

Personal details
- Born: 16 December 1965 (age 60) Pau, France
- Party: National Rally
- Occupation: Journalist, broadcaster, politician

Caroline Parmentier (French pronunciation: [kaʁɔlin paʁmɑ̃tje]; born 16 December 1965) is a French journalist, editor, public commentator and politician. A member of the National Rally (RN), she was elected as the deputy for the 9th constituency of the Pas-de-Calais department in the National Assembly in 2022.

== Early life and journalism career ==
Parmentier was born on 16 December 1965 in Basses-Pyrénées and grew up in Pau. After leaving school, she joined Présent newspaper under the direction of Jean Madiran. She was a trainee reporter but rose through the ranks of the paper to become its editor in chief. She authored a book with her perspectives on the journalism industry in 1996. In 2014, she became a presenter and commentator on the show Bistro Libertés on TV Libertés.

During her career at Présent, Parmentier was sometimes known for her forthright opinions on certain issues. She has written against abortion and has argued that the French government have sought to replace French nationals with migrants due to declining birthrates and the rise of abortion in France. In 1995, she was sentenced by the Paris Criminal Court for “racial public defamation” following an article she had written.

== Political career ==
Parmentier suspended her journalism career in 2018 to support Marine Le Pen's campaigns. During the 2019 European Parliament election she acted as Jordan Bardella's campaign coordinator and media strategist.

For the 2022 French legislative election, she contested Pas-de-Calais's 9th constituency in the National Assembly and won the seat in second round defeating incumbent Marguerite Deprez-Audebert. She has also been a regional councilor in Île-de-France since 2021.

== See also ==
- List of deputies of the 16th National Assembly of France
