= Komorowice =

Komorowice may refer to the following places in Poland:

- Komorowice, Strzelin County in Lower Silesian Voivodeship (south-west Poland)
- Komorowice, Wrocław County in Lower Silesian Voivodeship (south-west Poland)
- Komorowice, Greater Poland Voivodeship (west-central Poland)
- Komorowice, Bielsko-Biała (south Poland)
