= Santi Urbano e Lorenzo a Prima Porta =

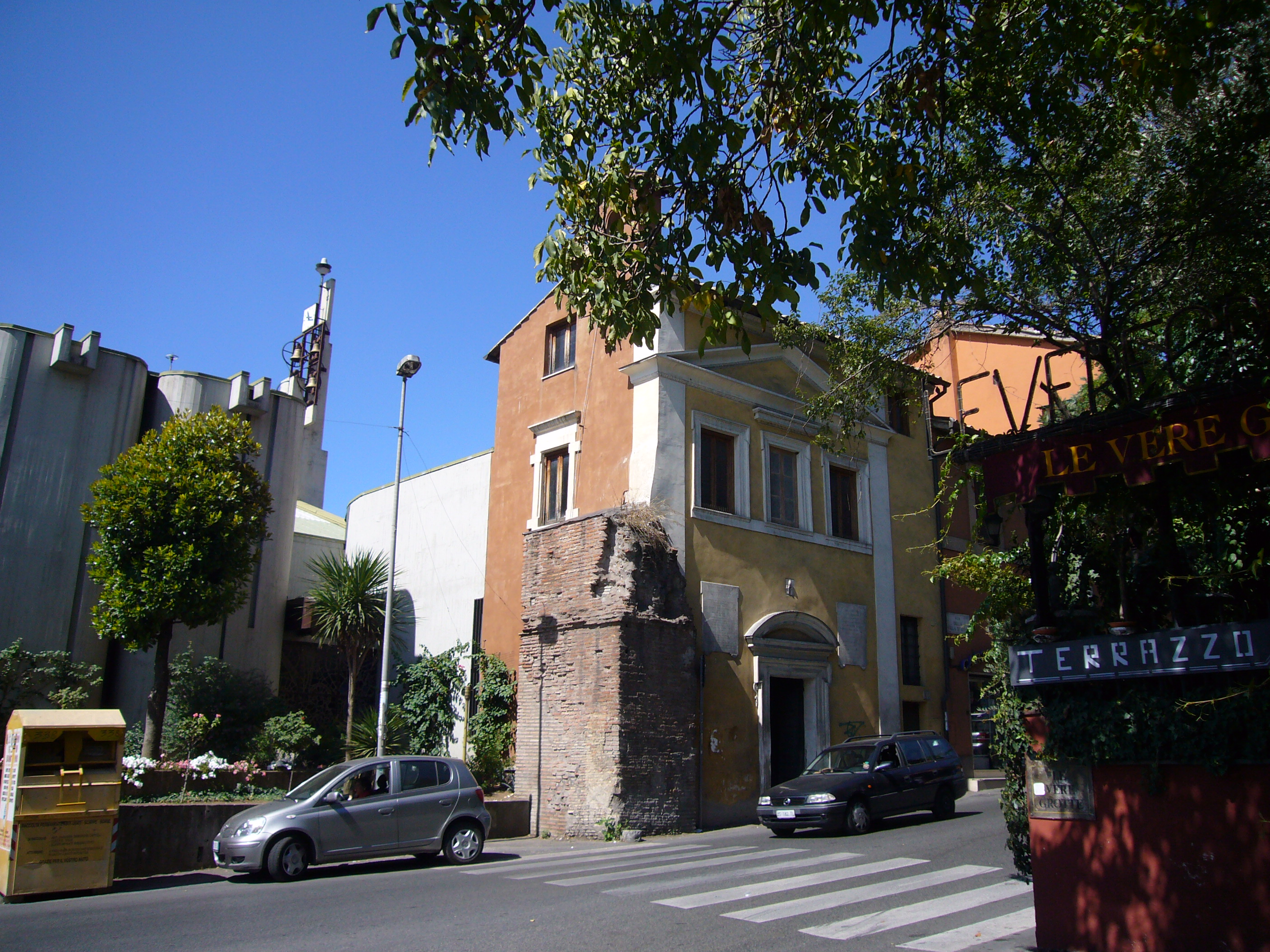
Church of Santi Urbano e Lorenzo a Prima Porta

Santi Urbano e Lorenzo a Prima Porta, a church in the diocese of Rome, was made a cardinalate deaconry by Pope John Paul II in November 1994 and was assigned to Cardinal Gilberto Agustoni, then Prefect of the Apostolic Signatura. In 2005 he took the option, which is open to Cardinal-Deacons after ten years, of becoming a Cardinal-Priest, with the same church as his titular church. Cardinal Agustoni died in 2017.

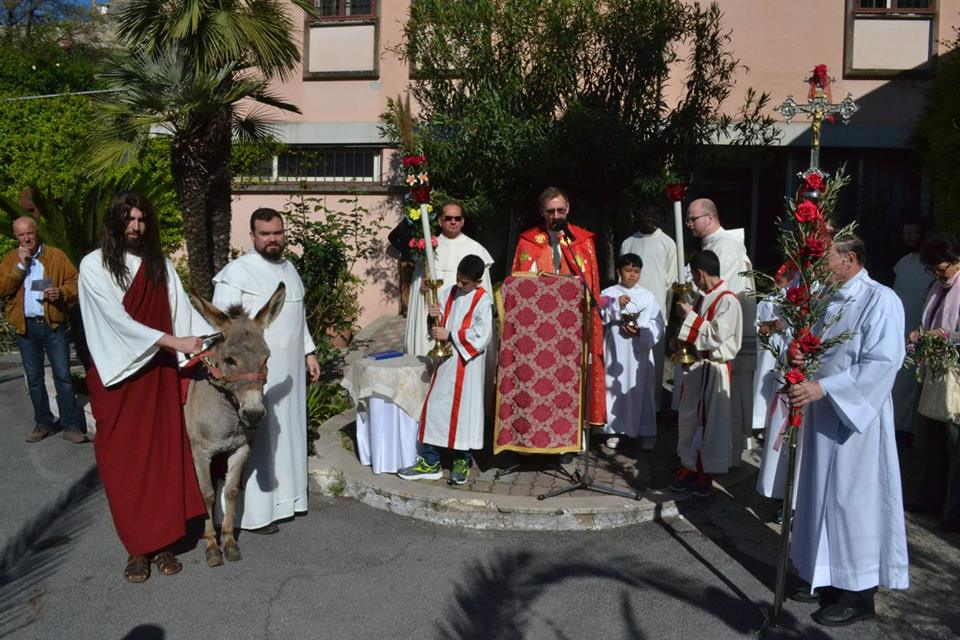
Palm Sunday at Parrocchia Santi Urbano e Lorenzo a Prima Porta,

The Parish is in the care of the Pauline Fathers, who have a monastery as part of the parish complex. The monastery also serves as the house of formation for the order's seminarians of the Australian province and those who will serve in the Italian delegation of the Order. The seminarians commute to and study at the Angelicum. Life in the parish serves as the backbone of the pastoral formation of the seminarians, who are encouraged to learn Italian, the language of the parish and the house. Thus the Prior of the house serves as Prior of the monastery, Pastor of the Parish and Prefect of the Seminarians.

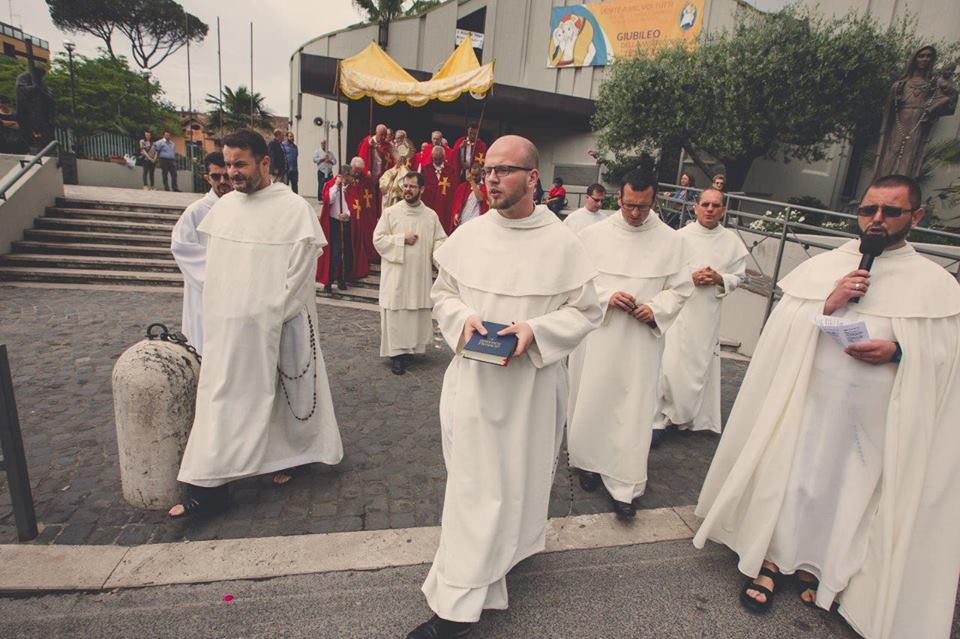
The Pauline monks in procession for Corpus Christi at Parrocchia Santi Urbano e Lorenzo a Prima Porta

== List of Cardinal Protectors ==
- Gilberto Agustoni (26 November 1994 - 13 January 2017)
- Víctor Manuel Fernández (30 September 2023 - )
