= Mokre Ogrody =

- Settlement
- Location within Poland
- Coordinates: 52°27′36″N 16°08′21″E
- Country: Poland
- Voivodeship: Greater Poland
- County: Nowy Tomyśl
- Gmina: Lwówek
- Population: 9

Mokre Ogrody [ˈmɔkrɛ ɔˈɡrɔdɨ] is a settlement in the administrative district of Gmina Lwówek, within Nowy Tomyśl County, Greater Poland Voivodeship, in west-central Poland.
