= Gmina Lwówek =

Gmina Lwówek Lwówek Commune
- Gmina
- Coat of arms
- Interactive map of Gmina Lwówek
- Coordinates (Lwówek): 52°27′N 16°11′E
- Country: Poland
- Voivodeship: Greater Poland
- County: Nowy Tomyśl
- Seat: Lwówek

Area
  - Total: 183.5 km^{2} (70.8 sq mi)

Population (2011)
  - Total: 9,340
  - Density: 50.9/km^{2} (132/sq mi)
  - Urban: 3,047
  - Rural: 6,293
- Website: www.lwowek.com.pl

Gmina Lwówek is an urban-rural gmina (administrative district) in Nowy Tomyśl County, Greater Poland Voivodeship, in west-central Poland. Its seat is the town of Lwówek, which lies approximately 16 kilometres (10 mi) north of Nowy Tomyśl and 51 km (32 mi) west of the regional capital Poznań.

The gmina covers an area of 183.5 square kilometres (70.8 sq mi), and as of 2006 its total population is 9,151 (out of which the population of Lwówek amounts to 2,909, and the population of the rural part of the gmina is 6,242).

== Villages ==
Apart from the town of Lwówek, Gmina Lwówek contains the villages and settlements of Bródki, Brody, Chmielinko, Grońsko, Grudzianka, Józefowo, Komorowice, Komorowo, Konin, Krzywy Las, Linie, Lipka Wielka, Marszewo, Mokre Ogrody, Pakosław, Pawłówek, Posadowo, Tarnowiec, Władysławowo, Wymyślanka, Zębowo, Zgierzynka and Zygmuntowo.

== Neighbouring gminas ==
Gmina Lwówek is bordered by the gminas of Duszniki, Kuślin, Kwilcz, Miedzichowo, Międzychód, Nowy Tomyśl and Pniewy.
