= Józefowo, Nowy Tomyśl County =

Józefowo
- Village
- Location within Poland
- Coordinates: 52°25′54″N 16°10′41″E
- Country: Poland
- Voivodeship: Greater Poland
- County: Nowy Tomyśl
- Gmina: Lwówek

Józefowo (Polish: [juzɛˈfɔvɔ]; German: Josefshof) is a village in the administrative district of Gmina Lwówek, within Nowy Tomyśl County, Greater Poland Voivodeship, in west-central Poland.
