= Evangelical Church, Nekielka =

Church in Nekielka, Poland

Coordinates: 52°23′31″N 17°23′14″E

The Evangelical Church, Nekielka is a neo-gothic church in Nekielka, Września County, Poland. The church has been on the national heritage list since 1999.

== History ==
The church was first built in the village of Nekielka by Hauländer settlers in 1754. The church was a religious center not only to the settlers but also to residents of nearby villages. In 1881 the original building was demolished and rebuilt in a neo-gothic style. The new building was consecrated in October 1884 and later renovated in 1907. During World War II the church used to store weapons; and after the war, it was used as warehouse. In 1992 Tschurl-Karen family purchased the building. Later, In 2005, a commemorative plaque was placed in the church to commemorate the area's early Hauländer settlers. Photo of the Church plaque - "Lutheran Brothers settled here 1749"

== The current function ==
Currently, the building serves as the church hall.

== Gallery ==
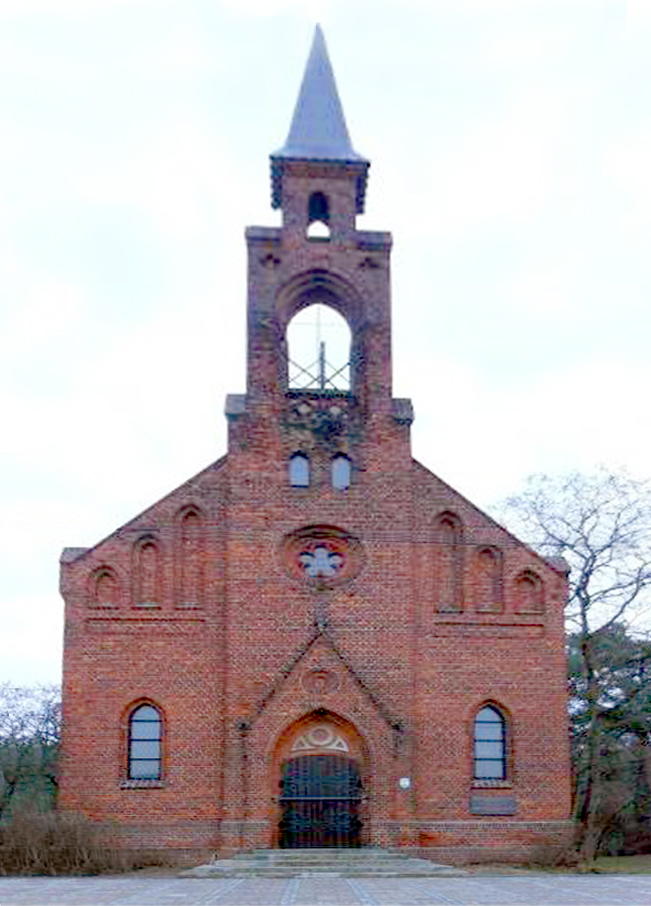
front

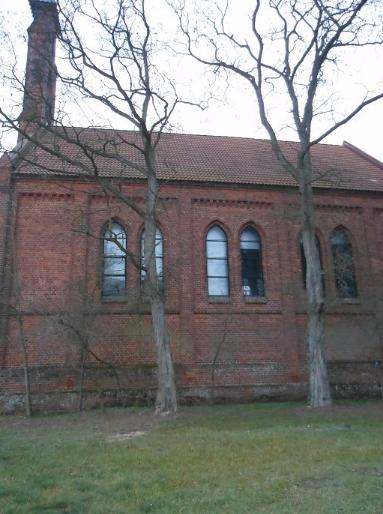
southern wall

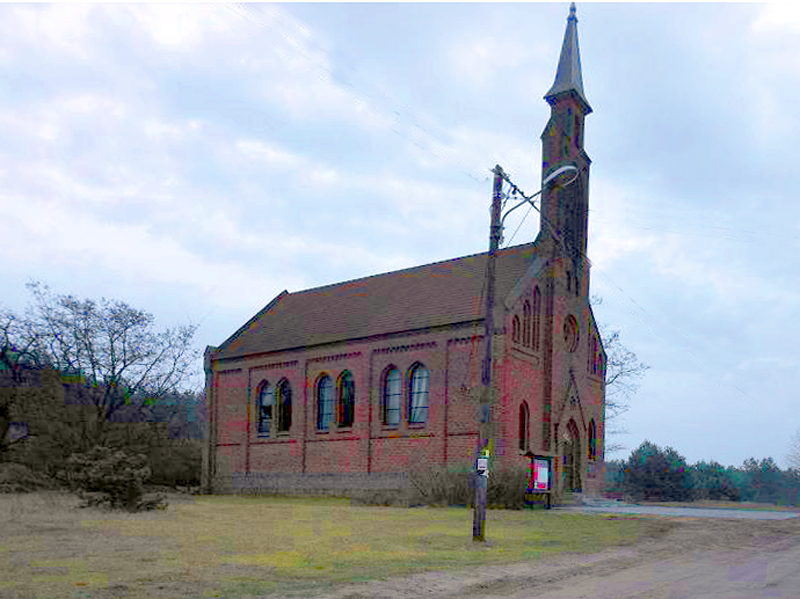
view from the north
