= Komorowo, Nowy Tomyśl County =

Komorowo
- Village
- Location within Poland
- Coordinates: 52°27′N 16°7′E
- Country: Poland
- Voivodeship: Greater Poland
- County: Nowy Tomyśl
- Gmina: Lwówek
- Elevation: 94 m (308 ft)
- Population: 219

Komorowo [kɔmɔˈrɔvɔ] is a village in the administrative district of Gmina Lwówek, within Nowy Tomyśl County, Greater Poland Voivodeship, in west-central Poland.
