= Lwówek =

Town in Greater Poland Voivodeship, Poland

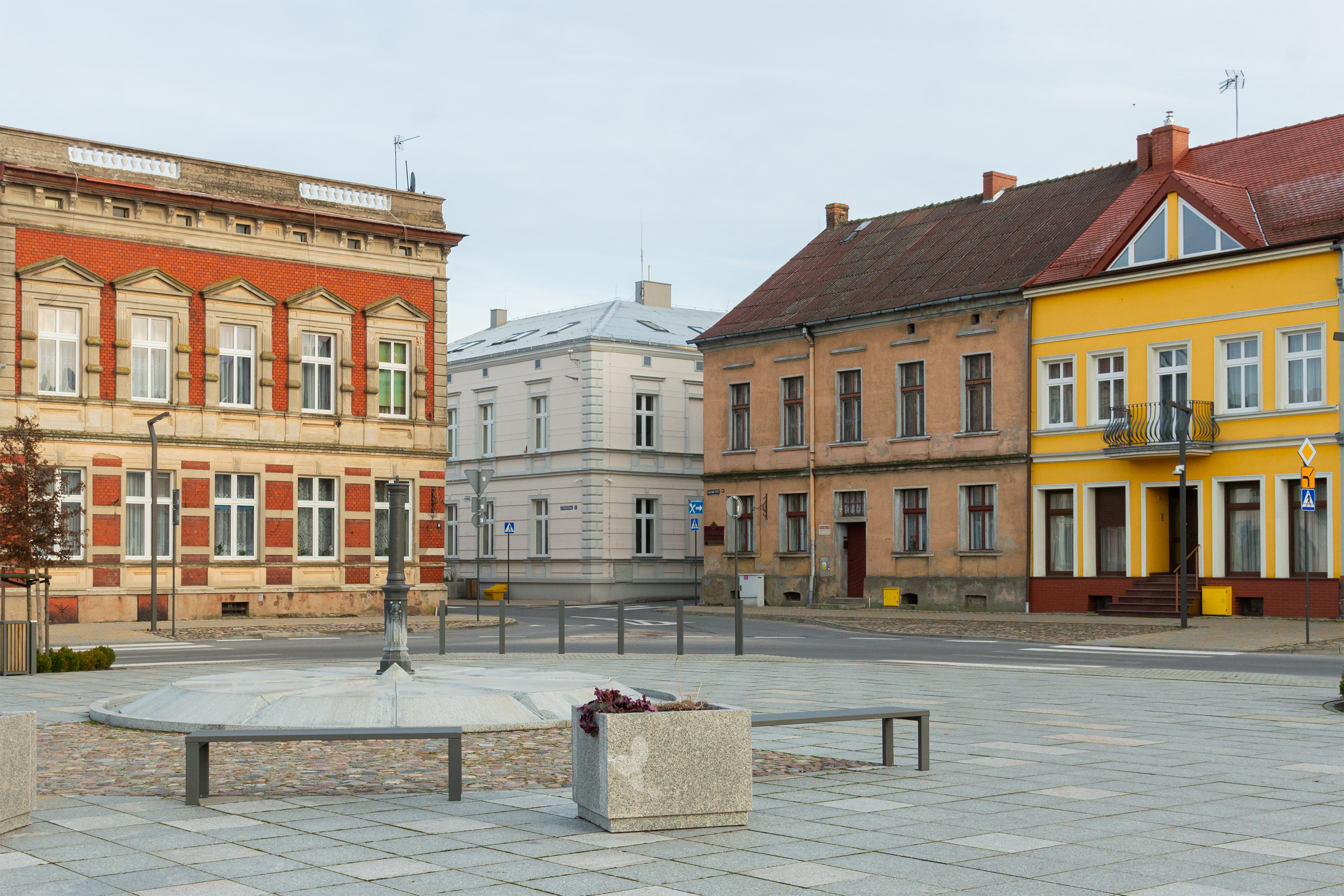
- Market Square in Lwówek

- Coat of arms

- Location within Poland
- Coordinates: 52°27′N 16°11′E
- Country: Poland
- Voivodeship: Greater Poland
- County: Nowy Tomyśl
- Gmina: Lwówek

Area
  - Total: 3.15 km^{2} (1.22 sq mi)
- Elevation: 100 m (330 ft)

Population (2010)
  - Total: 2,961
  - Density: 940/km^{2} (2,430/sq mi)
- Time zone: UTC+1 (CET)
  - Summer (DST): UTC+2 (CEST)
- Postal code: 64-310
- Vehicle registration: PNT
- Website: www.lwowek.com.pl

Lwówek [ˈlvuvɛk] is a town in Nowy Tomyśl County, Greater Poland Voivodeship, in western Poland, with 2,961 inhabitants (2010).

== History ==
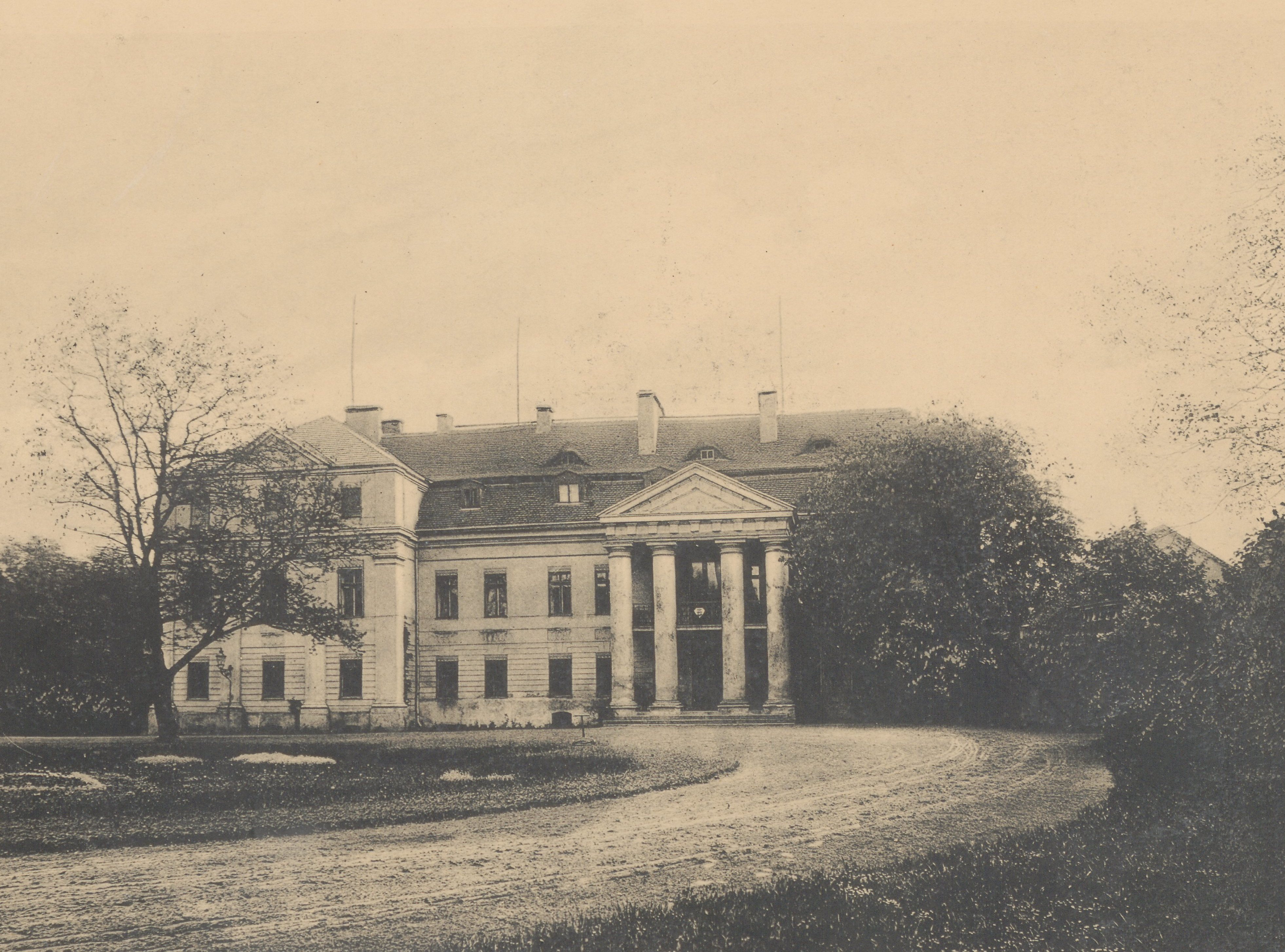
Early 20th-century view of the palace

Town rights were granted by King Władysław II Jagiełło. The town was known as Lwów, before the name was changed to the current Lwówek in the mid-15th century for distinction from the larger city of Lwów. Lwówek was a private town, administratively located in the Poznań County in the Poznań Voivodeship in the Greater Poland Province of the Kingdom of Poland.

540 Jews lived in the town in 1871.

Following the joint German-Soviet invasion of Poland, which started World War II in September 1939, Lwówek was occupied by Germany until 1945. The first expulsions of Poles were carried out in December 1939. The Poles were sent to a transit camp in Młyniewo, and afterwards deported to the General Government in the more-eastern part of German-occupied Poland, while their houses, workshops, etc. were handed over to German colonists as part of the Lebensraum policy. Several Poles who were either born or lived and worked in Lwówek were murdered by the Russians in the Katyn massacre in 1940. The Polish resistance was active in Lwówek. The commander of the Lwówek-Pniewy unit of the Union of Armed Struggle, was arrested by the Gestapo on 14 October 1942 and subjected to brutal interrogations during which he died a week later. Under German occupation, the town was renamed to Neustadt bei Pinne in 1939 and then to Kirschneustadt in 1943.

== Sights ==
Landmarks of Lwówek include the Baroque palace, the Gothic Church of the Assumption, the Baroque Holy Cross church and the Rynek (Market Square) filled with colourful historic townhouses.

== Demographics ==
Historical population

Year	Pop.	±%
1843	2,648	—
1871	2,456	−7.3%
1880	2,466	+0.4%
1890	2,331	−5.5%
1900	2,644	+13.4%
1910	2,666	+0.8%

Year	Pop.	±%
1921	2,552	−4.3%
1931	2,542	−0.4%
1939	2,750	+8.2%
1950	2,180	−20.7%
1960	2,337	+7.2%
2010	2,961	+26.7%

== Twin towns – sister cities ==
- Kazlų Rūda, Lithuania
