= Konin, Nowy Tomyśl County =

Konin
- Village
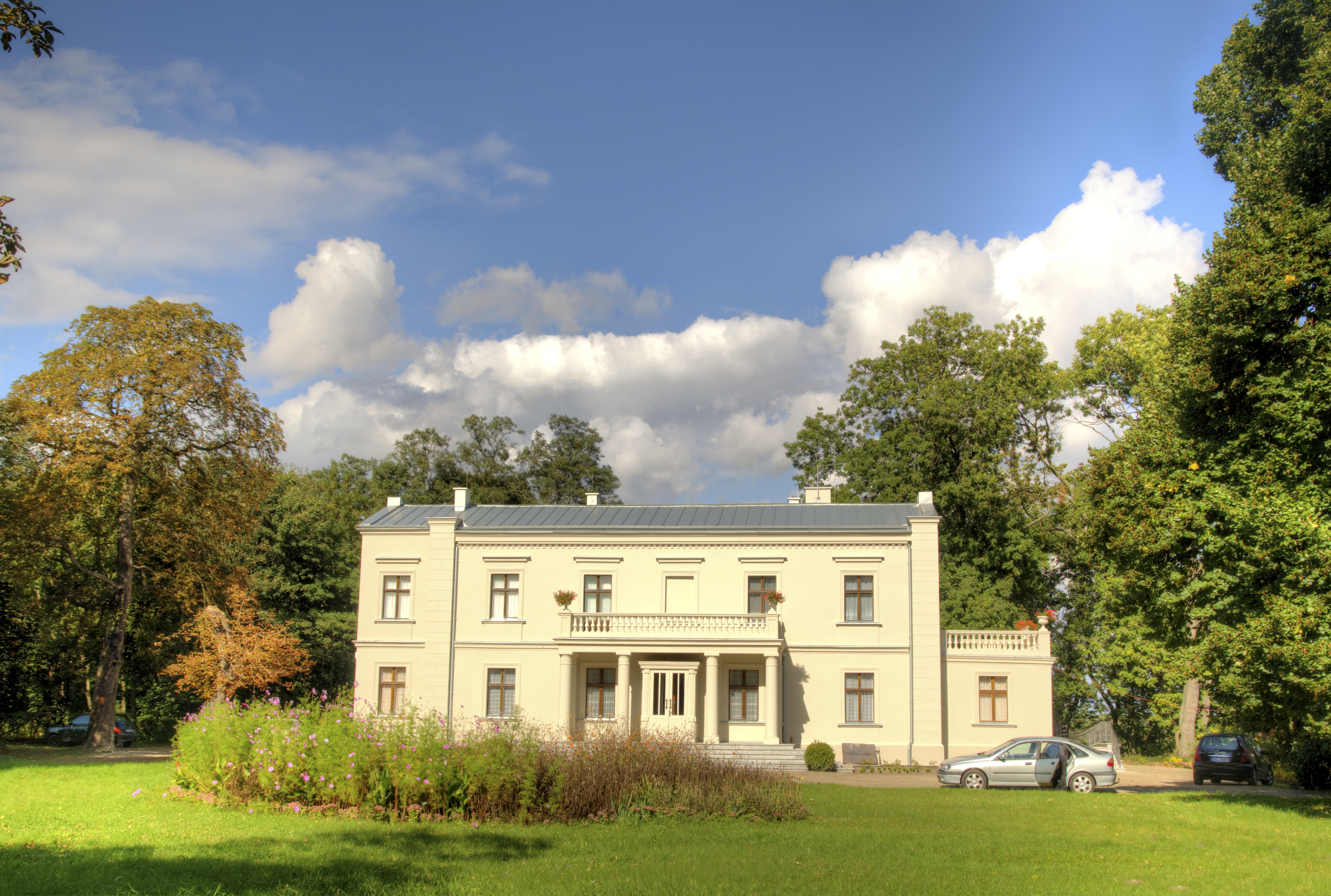
- Palace in Konin

- Location within Poland
- Coordinates: 52°28′33″N 16°11′24″E
- Country: Poland
- Voivodeship: Greater Poland
- County: Nowy Tomyśl
- Gmina: Lwówek

Konin [ˈkɔnin] is a village in the administrative district of Gmina Lwówek, within Nowy Tomyśl County, Greater Poland Voivodeship, in west-central Poland.
