= Wymyślanka =

- Village
- Location within Poland
- Coordinates: 52°29′N 16°8′E
- Country: Poland
- Voivodeship: Greater Poland
- County: Nowy Tomyśl
- Gmina: Lwówek
- Elevation: 92 m (302 ft)
- Population: 61

Wymyślanka [vɨmɨˈɕlanka] is a village in the administrative district of Gmina Lwówek, within Nowy Tomyśl County, Greater Poland Voivodeship, in west-central Poland.
