= Krzywy Las, Greater Poland Voivodeship =

Krzywy Las
- Village
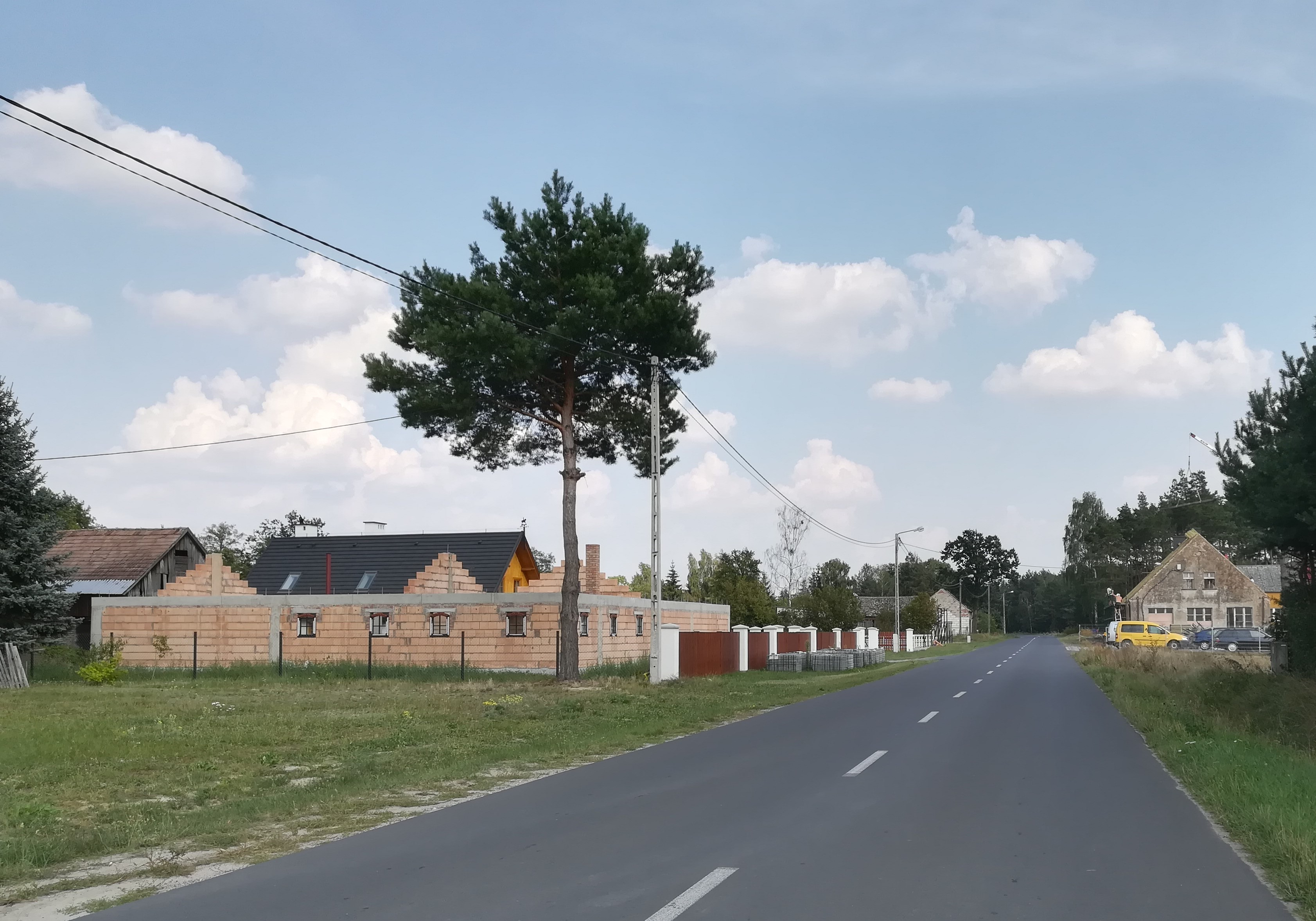

- Location within Poland
- Coordinates: 52°26′N 16°6′E
- Country: Poland
- Voivodeship: Greater Poland
- County: Nowy Tomyśl
- Gmina: Lwówek

Krzywy Las [ˈkʂɨvɨ ˈlas] is a village in the administrative district of Gmina Lwówek, within Nowy Tomyśl County, Greater Poland Voivodeship, in west-central Poland.
