= Pawłówek, Nowy Tomyśl County =

Pawłówek
- Village
- Location within Poland
- Coordinates: 52°28′0″N 16°9′18″E
- Country: Poland
- Voivodeship: Greater Poland
- County: Nowy Tomyśl
- Gmina: Lwówek
- Population: 66

Pawłówek [paˈvwuvɛk] is a village in the administrative district of Gmina Lwówek, within Nowy Tomyśl County, Greater Poland Voivodeship, in west-central Poland.
