= Brody, Nowy Tomyśl County =

Brody
- Village
- Location within Poland
- Coordinates: 52°26′N 16°18′E
- Country: Poland
- Voivodeship: Greater Poland
- County: Nowy Tomyśl
- Gmina: Lwówek
- Population: 750

Brody [ˈbrɔdɨ] is a village in the administrative district of Gmina Lwówek, within Nowy Tomyśl County, Greater Poland Voivodeship, in west-central Poland.
