= Marszewo, Nowy Tomyśl County =

Marszewo
- Settlement
- Location within Poland
- Coordinates: 52°24′31″N 16°19′30″E
- Country: Poland
- Voivodeship: Greater Poland
- County: Nowy Tomyśl
- Gmina: Lwówek
- Population: 17

Marszewo [marˈʂɛvɔ] is a settlement in the administrative district of Gmina Lwówek, within Nowy Tomyśl County, Greater Poland Voivodeship, in west-central Poland.
