= Holendry =

Holendry may refer to the following places:

- Holendry, Łódź Voivodeship (central Poland)
- Holendry, Lublin Voivodeship (east Poland)
- Holendry, Gmina Chmielnik in Świętokrzyskie Voivodeship (south-central Poland)
- Holendry, Gmina Pierzchnica in Świętokrzyskie Voivodeship (south-central Poland)
- Holendry, Masovian Voivodeship (east-central Poland)

It may also refer to a village organized under a particular form of law. See Olędrzy
