= Zygmuntowo, Nowy Tomyśl County =

Zygmuntowo
- Village
- Location within Poland
- Coordinates: 52°24′34″N 16°17′49″E
- Country: Poland
- Voivodeship: Greater Poland
- County: Nowy Tomyśl
- Gmina: Lwówek
- Population: 80

Zygmuntowo [zɨɡmunˈtɔvɔ] is a village in the administrative district of Gmina Lwówek, within Nowy Tomyśl County, Greater Poland Voivodeship, in west-central Poland.
