= Chmielinko =

- Village
- Location within Poland
- Coordinates: 52°25′N 16°12′E
- Country: Poland
- Voivodeship: Greater Poland
- County: Nowy Tomyśl
- Gmina: Lwówek
- Population: 570

Chmielinko [xmjɛˈlinkɔ] is a village in the administrative district of Gmina Lwówek, within Nowy Tomyśl County, Greater Poland Voivodeship, in west-central Poland.
