= Komorowice, Greater Poland Voivodeship =

Komorowice
- Village
- Location within Poland
- Coordinates: 52°27′N 16°5′E
- Country: Poland
- Voivodeship: Greater Poland
- County: Nowy Tomyśl
- Gmina: Lwówek

Komorowice [kɔmɔrɔˈvit͡sɛ] is a village in the administrative district of Gmina Lwówek, within Nowy Tomyśl County, Greater Poland Voivodeship, in west-central Poland.
