= Linie, Greater Poland Voivodeship =

Linie
- Village
- Location within Poland
- Coordinates: 52°29′1″N 16°3′21″E
- Country: Poland
- Voivodeship: Greater Poland
- County: Nowy Tomyśl
- Gmina: Lwówek
- Elevation: 90 m (300 ft)
- Population: 279

Linie [ˈliɲɛ] is a village in the administrative district of Gmina Lwówek, within Nowy Tomyśl County, Greater Poland Voivodeship, in west-central Poland.
