= Olendry =

Olendry may refer to several places:

- Olendry, Greater Poland Voivodeship (west-central Poland)
- Olendry, Łódź Voivodeship (central Poland)
- Olendry, Podlaskie Voivodeship (north-east Poland)
- Lipicze Olendry
- Smardowskie Olendry
