= Marguerite Deprez-Audebert =

French politician (born 1952)

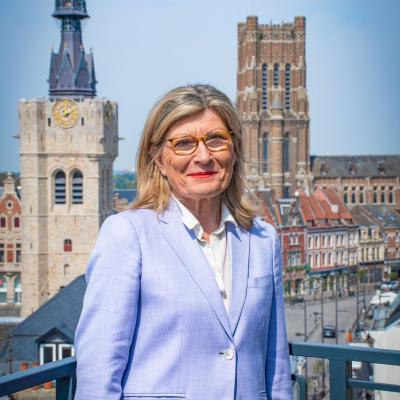

Member of the French National Assembly for Pas-de-Calais's 9th constituency
- In office 21 June 2017 – 21 June 2022
- Preceded by: Stéphane Saint-André
- Succeeded by: Caroline Parmentier

Personal details
- Born: 17 May 1952 (age 73) Béthune, France
- Party: Democratic Movement

Marguerite Deprez-Audebert (born 17 May 1952) is a French politician of the Democratic Movement (MoDem) who served as a member of the French National Assembly since the 2017 elections, representing the department of Pas-de-Calais.

== Political career ==
In parliament, Deprez-Audebert served as member of the Committee on Economic Affairs and the Committee on European Affairs. She has also been a member of the Committee on Sustainable Development and Spatial Planning. In addition to her committee assignments, she was a member of the French parliamentary friendship groups with Germany and Vietnam.

She lost her seat in the 2022 French legislative election.

== Political positions ==
In July 2019, Deprez-Audebert voted in favor of the French ratification of the European Union's Comprehensive Economic and Trade Agreement (CETA) with Canada.
