= André Flajolet =

French politician

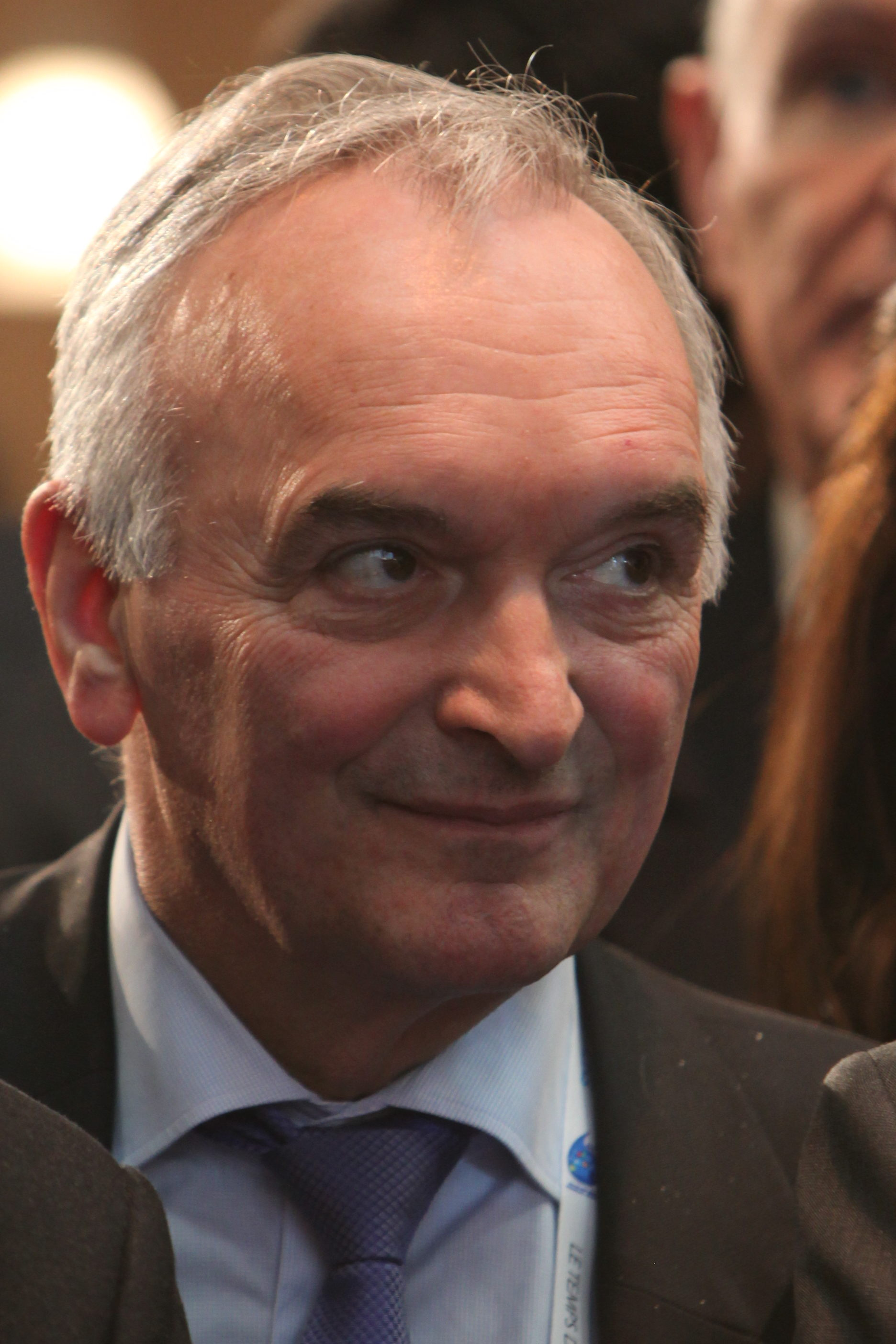
André Flajolet at the 6th World Water Forum

André Flajolet is a French politician. He was born on 6 December 1946 in Saint-Floris, department of Pas-de-Calais. He is a philosophy teacher. He was elected on 16 June 2002 deputy of the 9th circonscription of Pas-de-Calais (Béthune and surroundings) for the 12th Legislature so as becoming the first right-wing deputy for many years. He was re-elected on 17 June 2007 deputy of the 13th Legislature. During his two mandates, he was member of the Union for a Popular Movement parliamentary group.
