= Jean Madiran =

French rightist and traditionalist Catholic writer

Jean Arfel (14 June 1920 – 31 July 2013), better known by his pen name Jean Madiran (French pronunciation: [ʒɑ̃ madiʁɑ̃]), was a French right-wing editor, journalist and a traditionalist Catholic writer who was born in Libourne. He has also used the pen name Jean-Louis Lagor.

== Biography ==
During the German occupation of France, Madiran was the private secretary of Charles Maurras and was awarded the Order of the Francisque, the decoration, in the form of a stylised double-headed francisca, that was granted by Vichy France. He contributed to the newspaper Action Française. This was the organ of the movement of the same name and was published from 21 March 1908 to 24 August 1944. After the war, he was a professor of philosophy at the Ecole des Roches, a position he left in 1950 to devote himself to journalism and writing in Paris. In March 1956, he launched the traditional Catholic monthly Itinéraires which he would edit for the next forty years. In 1982, he co-founded the right-wing daily "Présent" which would continue publication until June 2022.

In an article published in Itinéraires, Madiran declared:

If we are asked to state what we are and what our position is, our answer must be understood. Our answer modifies François Brigneau's formula or rather completes and develops it in its full truth: "We are to the right of the far right." This does not mean that we despise indiscriminately everybody and everything that official jargon calls "the far right". Here again we reject the arbitrary left-wing attitude that inspires and imposes a classification at variance with the truth. In reality there is no extremism, right-wing or other, in wishing a society based on "Work-Family-Fatherland", "Serve God First".

== Works ==
- La Philosophie politique de saint Thomas, Les Éditions nouvelles, 1948, 193 p. (as Jean-Louis Lagor)
- Ils ne savent pas ce qu'ils font, Nouvelles Éditions latines, Paris, 1955. 192 p.
- On ne se moque pas de Dieu, Nouvelles Éditions latines, Paris, 1957. 207 p.
- Brasillach, Club du Luxembourg, Paris, 1958. 261 p.
- Doctrine, prudence et options libres, Nouvelles Éditions latines, coll. « Les Documents du Centre français de sociologie » n° 3, 1960. 32 p.
- L'Unité, Librairie des chercheurs et curieux, Paris, 1960. 32 p.
- De la Justice sociale, Nouvelles Éditions latines, coll. « Itinéraires », Paris, 1961. 91 p.
- Le principe de totalité, Nouvelles Éditions latines, coll. « Itinéraires », Paris, 1963. 95 p.
- Saint Thomas d'Aquin, Les principes de la réalité naturelle (De principiis naturae, introduction, traduction et notes par Jean Madiran, texte latin et traduction française en regard), Nouvelles Éditions latines, coll. « Docteur commun » n° 1, Paris, 1963, 127 p. – Réédition 1994. 127 p. (ISBN 2-7233-0483-3).
- L'intégrisme : histoire d'une histoire, Nouvelles Éditions latines, coll. « Itinéraires », 1964. 285 p.
- La vieillesse du monde : essai sur le communisme, Nouvelles Éditions latines, coll. Itinéraires, Paris, 1966. 237 p. (réédition 1975, Éditions Dominique Martin Morin, Paris. 140 p.)
- L'hérésie du XXe siècle [tome 1], Nouvelles Éditions latines, coll. « Itinéraires », 1968. 309 p. (new edition, 1988, 319 p., (ISBN 2-7233-0364-0)).
- Réclamation au Saint-Père [L'hérésie du XXe siècle, tome 2], Nouvelles Éditions latines, coll. « Itinéraires » n° 24, 1974. 300 p.
- La Messe, état de la question, Itinéraires (special number), Paris, 1976. 79 p. 5th edition.
- Les deux démocraties, Nouvelles Éditions latines, Paris, 1977. 199 p. (ISBN 2-7233-0024-2).
- La Droite et la gauche, Nouvelles Éditions latines, Paris, 1977. 118 p. (ISBN 2-7233-0017-X).
- La République du Panthéon : explication de la politique française (collection of texts published in Itinéraires from 1974 to 1981), Éditions Dominique Martin Morin, Bouère, 1982. 176 p. (ISBN 2-85652-049-9).
- Éditoriaux et chroniques. 1, De la fondation d'"Itinéraires" à sa condamnation par l'épiscopat, 1956-1966, Éditions Dominique Martin Morin, Bouère, 1983. 316 p. (ISBN 2-85652-055-3).
- Éditoriaux et chroniques. 2, Le Catéchisme, l'Écriture et la messe, 1967-1973, Éditions Dominique Martin Morin, Bouère, 1984. 331 p. (ISBN 2-85652-062-6).
- Éditoriaux et chroniques. 3, La France à la dérive et la décomposition de l'Église : 1974-1981, Éditions Dominique Martin Morin, Bouère, 1984. 320 p. (ISBN 2-85652-07-5-8).
- Le Concile en question : correspondance Congar-Madiran sur Vatican II et sur la crise de l'Église (coauthored with Yves Congar), Éditions Dominique Martin Morin, Bouère, 1985. 175 p. (ISBN 2-85652-079-0).
- Les Droits de l'homme DHSD, Éditions de Présent, Maule, 1988. 159 p. (ISBN 2-905781-07-6) (réédition, 1995, (ISBN 2-905781-13-0)).
- Le vol du butor : divertissement littéraire sur ma vie et mes œuvres, Itinéraires (special number), Paris, 1990. 16 p.
- Quand il y a une éclipse, Éditions Difralivre, Maule, 1990. 206 p. (ISBN 2-908232-02-2).
- Maurras, Nouvelles Éditions latines, Paris, 1992. 234 p. (ISBN 2-7233-0452-3).
- Court précis de la loi naturelle selon la doctrine chrétienne, Itinéraires (special number), 1995. 46 p.
- Le Monde et ses faux, Éditions de Présent, Paris, 1997. 112 p. (ISBN 2-905781-15-7).
- L'extrême droite et l'Église : réponse, Éditions de Présent, Paris, 1998. 161 p. (ISBN 2-905781-18-1). Written in response to L'extrême droite et l'Église by Xavier Ternisien, 1997, éd. Brepols.
- Une civilisation blessée au cœur, Éditions Sainte-Madeleine, Le Barroux, 2002. 109 p. (ISBN 2-906972-41-X).
- La révolution copernicienne dans l'Église, Éditions Consep, Paris, 2002. 107 p. (ISBN 2-85162-090-8).
- La trahison des commissaires, Éditions Consep, Versailles, 2004. 65 p. (ISBN 2-85162-147-5).
- Maurras toujours là, Éditions Consep, Versailles, 2004. 102 p. (ISBN 2-85162-120-3).
- Histoire du catéchisme, 1955-2005, Éditions Consep, Versailles, 2005. 160 p. (ISBN 2-85162-083-5).
- La laïcité dans l'Église, Éditions Consep, Versailles, 2005. 152 p. (ISBN 2-85162-159-9).
- L'accord de Metz : ou pourquoi notre Mère fut muette, Éditions Via Romana, 2007
- Histoire de la messe interdite : Fascicule 1 (1964-1976), Via Romana, Versailles, 2007, 122 p. (ISBN 978-2-916727-20-2)
- La trahison des commissaires, Via Romana, 2008, (3rd edition) 103 p. (ISBN 978-2-916727-31-8)
- Enquête sur la maladie de la presse écrite, Via Romana, 2008, 64 p. (ISBN 978-2-916727-38-7)
- Histoire de la messe interdite : Fascicule 2 (1976-1989), Via Romana, 2009, 160 p. (ISBN 978-2-916727-50-9)
- Chroniques sous Benoît XVI, Via Romana, 2010, 430 p. (ISBN 978-2-916727-71-4)
