= Dąbrowa =

Dąbrowa (Polish for 'oak forest') may refer to:

== Places in Poland ==
=== Greater Poland Voivodeship ===
- Dąbrowa, Gniezno County, a settlement in Gmina Trzemeszno
- Dąbrowa, Jarocin County, a village in Gmina Jarocin
- Dąbrowa, Kalisz County, a village in Gmina Koźminek
- Dąbrowa, Koło County, a village in Gmina Koło
- Dąbrowa, Konin County, a village in Gmina Sompolno
- Dąbrowa, Gmina Krotoszyn, a village in Krotoszyn County
- Dąbrowa, Gmina Rozdrażew, a village in Krotoszyn County
- Dąbrowa, Gmina Kuślin, a village in Nowy Tomyśl County
- Dąbrowa, Gmina Zbąszyń, a settlement in Nowy Tomyśl County
- Dąbrowa, Poznań County, a village in Gmina Dopiewo
- Dąbrowa, Rawicz County, a village in Gmina Miejska Górka
- Dąbrowa, Słupca County, a village in Gmina Lądek
- Dąbrowa, Śrem County, a village in Gmina Śrem
- Dąbrowa, Gmina Nowe Miasto nad Wartą, a village in Środa County
- Dąbrowa, Gmina Pniewy, a settlement in Szamotuły County
- Dąbrowa, Gmina Wronki, a village in Szamotuły County
- Dąbrowa, Gmina Brudzew, a village in Turek County
- Dąbrowa, Gmina Dobra, a village in Turek County
- Dąbrowa, Gmina Przykona, a village in Turek County
- Dąbrowa, Wągrowiec County, a village in Gmina Damasławek

=== Kuyavian-Pomeranian Voivodeship ===
- Dąbrowa, Mogilno County, a village in Gmina Dąbrowa
  - Gmina Dąbrowa, Kuyavian-Pomeranian Voivodeship, a rural administrative division in Mogilno County
- Dąbrowa, Sępólno County, a village in Gmina Kamień Krajeński

=== Lesser Poland Voivodeship ===
- Dąbrowa County, a unit of territorial administration and local government (powiat)
- Dąbrowa, Nowy Sącz County, a village in Gmina Chełmiec
- Dąbrowa, Wieliczka County, a village in Gmina Kłaj

=== Łódź Voivodeship ===
- Dąbrowa, Gmina Kleszczów, a settlement in Bełchatów County
- Dąbrowa, Gmina Rusiec, a village in Bełchatów County
- Dąbrowa, Gmina Zelów, a village in Bełchatów County
- Dąbrowa, Brzeziny County, a village in Gmina Jeżów
- Dąbrowa, Łask County, a village in Gmina Buczek
- Dąbrowa, Łowicz County, a village in Gmina Zduny
- Dąbrowa, Łódź East County, a village in Gmina Nowosolna
- Dąbrowa, Opoczno County, a village in Gmina Sławno
- Dąbrowa, Pabianice County, a village in Gmina Dłutów
- Dąbrowa, Gmina Kiełczygłów, a village in Pajęczno County
- Dąbrowa, Gmina Sulmierzyce, a village in Pajęczno County
- Dąbrowa, Piotrków County, a village in Gmina Łęki Szlacheckie
- Dąbrowa, Poddębice County, a village in Gmina Uniejów
- Dąbrowa, Radomsko County, a village in Gmina Kamieńsk
- Dąbrowa, Gmina Inowłódz, a village in Tomaszów County
- Dąbrowa, Gmina Lubochnia, a village in Tomaszów County
- Dąbrowa, Gmina Tomaszów Mazowiecki, a village in Tomaszów County
- Dąbrowa, Wieluń County, a village in Gmina Wieluń
- Dąbrowa, Zgierz County, a village in Gmina Głowno
- Dąbrowa Widawska, a village in Gmina Widawa, Łask County

=== Lower Silesian Voivodeship ===
- Dąbrowa, Milicz County, a village in Gmina Krośnice
- Dąbrowa, Gmina Oleśnica, a village in Oleśnica County
- Dąbrowa, Gmina Twardogóra, a village in Oleśnica County
- Dąbrowa, Polkowice County, a village in Gmina Polkowice

=== Lublin Voivodeship ===
- Dąbrowa, Gmina Hrubieszów, a village in Hrubieszów County
- Dąbrowa, Gmina Mircze, a village in Hrubieszów County
- Dąbrowa, Gmina Annopol, a village in Kraśnik County
- Dąbrowa, Gmina Trzydnik Duży, a village in Kraśnik County
- Dąbrowa, Gmina Ludwin, a village in Łęczna County
- Dąbrowa, Gmina Milejów, a village in Łęczna County
- Dąbrowa, Lublin County, a village in Gmina Borzechów
- Dąbrowa, Gmina Krynice, a village in Tomaszów County
- Dąbrowa, Gmina Tomaszów Lubelski, a village in Tomaszów County
- Dąbrowa, Zamość County, a village in Gmina Łabunie

=== Lubusz Voivodeship ===
- Dąbrowa, Zielona Góra County, a village in Gmina Zabór
- Dąbrowa, Żary County, a village in Gmina Lubsko

=== Masovian Voivodeship ===
- Dąbrowa, Ciechanów County, a village in Gmina Ojrzeń
- Dąbrowa, Garwolin County, a village in Gmina Łaskarzew
- Dąbrowa, Gmina Mogielnica, a village in Grójec County
- Dąbrowa, Gmina Nowe Miasto nad Pilicą, a village in Grójec County
- Dąbrowa, Lipsko County, a village in Gmina Ciepielów
- Dąbrowa, Gmina Mrozy, a village in Mińsk County
- Dąbrowa, Gmina Siennica, a village in Mińsk County
- Dąbrowa, Mława County, a village in Gmina Strzegowo
- Dąbrowa, Gmina Nasielsk, a village in Nowy Dwór County
- Dąbrowa, Ostrołęka County, a village in Gmina Baranowo
- Dąbrowa, Gmina Andrzejewo, a village in Ostrów County
- Dąbrowa, Przasnysz County, a village in Gmina Chorzele
- Dąbrowa, Przysucha County, a village in Gmina Odrzywół
- Dąbrowa, Gmina Mokobody, a village in Siedlce County
- Dąbrowa, Gmina Przesmyki, a village in Siedlce County
- Dąbrowa, Sokołów County, a village in Gmina Sokołów Podlaski
- Dąbrowa, Gmina Korytnica, a village in Węgrów County
- Dąbrowa, Gmina Łochów, a village in Węgrów County
- Dąbrowa, Wyszków County, a village in Gmina Rząśnik
- Dąbrowa, Żuromin County, a village in Gmina Żuromin

=== Opole Voivodeship ===
- Dąbrowa, Namysłów County, a village in Gmina Świerczów
- Gmina Dąbrowa, Opole Voivodeship, a rural administrative district in Opole County
  - Dąbrowa, Opole County, a village in Gmina Dąbrowa

=== Podlaskie Voivodeship ===
- Dąbrowa, Gmina Kleszczele, a settlement in Hajnówka County
- Dąbrowa, Gmina Narewka, a village in Hajnówka County
- Dąbrowa, Gmina Grabowo, a village in Kolno County
- Dąbrowa, Gmina Stawiski, a village in Kolno County

=== Pomeranian Voivodeship ===
- Dąbrowa, Kartuzy County, a village in Gmina Stężyca, Kartuzy County
- Dąbrowa, Kościerzyna County, a village in Gmina Karsin
- Dąbrowa, Malbork County, a village in Gmina Lichnowy
- Dąbrowa, Puck County, a settlement in Gmina Krokowa
- Dąbrowa, Starogard County, a village in Gmina Kaliska

=== Silesian Voivodeship ===
- Dąbrowa, Częstochowa County, a village in Gmina Koniecpol
- Dąbrowa, Gmina Popów, a village in Kłobuck County
- Dąbrowa, Gmina Przystajń, a village in Kłobuck County
- Dąbrowa Górnicza, a city

=== Subcarpathian Voivodeship ===
- Dąbrowa, Lubaczów County, a village in Gmina Lubaczów
- Dąbrowa, Rzeszów County, a village in Gmina Świlcza
- Dąbrowa, Stalowa Wola County, a village in Gmina Zaklików

=== Świętokrzyskie Voivodeship ===
- Dąbrowa, Kielce County, a village in Gmina Masłów
- Dąbrowa, Końskie County, a village in Gmina Fałków
- Dąbrowa, Starachowice County, a village in Gmina Pawłów

=== Warmian-Masurian Voivodeship ===
- Dąbrowa, Gmina Bartoszyce, a village in Bartoszyce County
- Dąbrowa, Gmina Bisztynek, a village in Bartoszyce County
- Dąbrowa, Braniewo County, a village in Gmina Płoskinia
- Dąbrowa, Iława County, a village in Gmina Iława
- Dąbrowa, Kętrzyn County, a village in Gmina Kętrzyn
- Dąbrowa, Ostróda County, a village in Gmina Dąbrówno
- Dąbrowa, Gmina Dźwierzuty, a village in Szczytno County
- Dąbrowa, Gmina Wielbark, a village in Szczytno County

=== West Pomeranian Voivodeship ===
- Dąbrowa, Kamień County, a village in Gmina Świerzno
- Dąbrowa, Koszalin County, a village in Gmina Sianów
- Dąbrowa, Gmina Myślibórz, a village in Gmina Myślibórz, Myślibórz County
- Dąbrowa (Rościn), a settlement in Gmina Myślibórz, Myślibórz County
- Dąbrowa, Szczecinek County, a village in Gmina Szczecinek

=== Other areas ===
- Dąbrowa Basin or Zagłębie Dąbrowskie, a geographical and historical region in southern Poland

== Places in the Czech Republic ==
- Dąbrowa (Polish name for Doubrava), a village in Karviná District

== See also ==
- Dąbrowa coat of arms
- Doubrava (disambiguation)
- Dubrava (disambiguation)
