= Doubrava =

Doubrava may refer to:

== Places in the Czech Republic ==
- Doubrava (river), a tributary of the Elbe
- Doubrava (Karviná District), a municipality and village in the Moravian-Silesian Region
- Doubrava (Aš), a village and part of Aš in the Karlovy Vary Region
- Doubrava, a village and part of Chrášťany (České Budějovice District) in the South Bohemian Region
- Doubrava, a village and part of Hořice in the Hradec Králové Region
- Doubrava, a village and part of Kostomlátky in the Central Bohemian Region
- Doubrava, a village and part of Lipová (Cheb District) in the Karlovy Vary Region
- Doubrava, a village and part of Nýřany in the Plzeň Region
- Doubrava, a village and part of Puclice in the Plzeň Region
- Doubrava, a village and part of Vlachovo Březí in the South Bohemian Region
- Doubrava, a village and part of Žďár (Mladá Boleslav District) in the Central Bohemian Region
- Karlov t. Doubrava, a village and part of Vidice (Kutná Hora District) in the Central Bohemian Region

== People ==
- Jaroslav Doubrava, a Czech composer

== See also ==
- Doubravka
- Dubrava (disambiguation)
- Dąbrowa (disambiguation)
- Dúbravka (disambiguation)
- Dąbrówka (disambiguation)
