= Dubrava =

Dubrava or Dúbrava may refer to several places:

== Bosnia and Herzegovina ==
- Dubrava, Kalinovik, a village

== Croatia ==
- Dubrava, Zagreb, a neighbourhood of Zagreb
- Dubrava, Zagreb County, a village and municipality
- Lake Dubrava
- Dubrava, Dubrovnik-Neretva County
- Dubrava, Split-Dalmatia County, a village near Omiš
- Dubrava Zabočka
- Dubrava kod Šibenika, a village near Šibenik
- Dubrava kod Tisna, a village near Tisno

== Montenegro ==
- Dubrava, Pljevlja

== Serbia ==
- Dubrava, Bojnik
- Dubrava, Ivanjica
- Dubrava (Knić)
- Dubrava, Kuršumlija

== Slovakia ==
- Dúbrava, Liptovský Mikuláš District
- Dúbrava, Levoča District
- Dúbrava, Snina District
- Hronská Dúbrava

== See also ==
- Dúbrava (disambiguation), a Slovak toponym
- Doubrava (disambiguation), a Czech term
- Dumbrava (disambiguation), a Romanian term
- Dubrave (disambiguation), South Slavic plural term
- Dabrava (disambiguation), a Bulgarian toponym
- Dąbrowa (disambiguation), a Polish term
- Dubravica (disambiguation), South Slavic diminutive term
