= Dubravice =

Dubravice may refer to the following places:

- Dubravice (Bratunac), a village in Bosnia and Herzegovina
- Dubravice (Konjic), a village in Bosnia and Herzegovina
- Dubravice, Croatia, a village near Skradin

== See also ==
- Dubravica (disambiguation)
