= Zabok =

- Town
- Grad Zabok; Town of Zabok
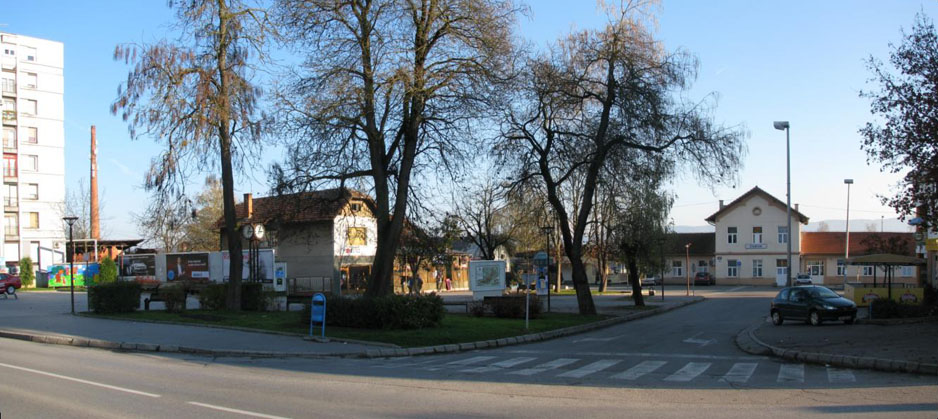
- Zabok town center

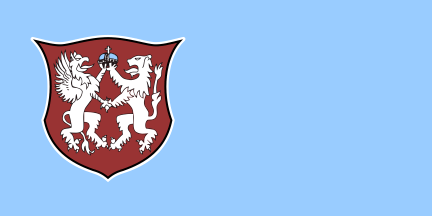
- Flag
- Interactive map of Zabok
- Location of Zabok in Krapina-Zagorje County Zabok (Croatia)
- Coordinates: 46°02′N 15°55′E
- Country: Croatia
- Region: Central Croatia (Hrvatsko Zagorje)
- County: Krapina-Zagorje County

Government
  - Type: Mayor-council
  - Mayor: Valentina Đurek (SDP)

Area
  - Town: 34.6 km^{2} (13.4 sq mi)
  - Urban: 4.9 km^{2} (1.9 sq mi)
- Elevation: 186 m (610 ft)

Population (2021)
  - Town: 8,656
  - Density: 250/km^{2} (648/sq mi)
  - Urban: 3,408
  - Urban density: 700/km^{2} (1,800/sq mi)
- Time zone: UTC+1 (CET)
  - Summer (DST): UTC+2 (CEST)
- Postal code: 49210 Zabok
- Website: zabok.hr

Zabok is a town situated in northwest Croatia in the Krapina-Zagorje County. According to the 2011 census, it has a total population of 8,994, with 2,714 in Zabok itself. Zabok is situated on the main crossroads in the heart of Hrvatsko Zagorje region. Zabok is the economical centre of the Krapina-Zagorje County.

== History ==
The name Zabok first appeared in 1335 in a text in which ownership of Zabok was given to Petar, son of Nuzlin, by the Hungarian king, Charles I. "Zabok" means "behind the river curve" (the river in question is the Krapinica). The Nuzlin family added the prefix de Zabok to their name and, by the 15th century, had started naming themselves "Zaboky de Zabok".

In 1782, Sigismund Vojković-Vojkffy started the construction of a church in Zabok, completing it in 1805. With the abolition of the feudalism, former serfs were offered a possibility of choosing their own place of settlement, and the majority settled along the roads connecting Gredice and Bračak with the new centre developing around the church, to form the new city centre. The town reached its final shape in the period after World War II, when it spread longitudinally along the northern side of the railway track.

Zabok was granted town status in 1993, and until then it was the seat of the former Zabok Municipality. The Town Day of Zabok is on May 22nd.

The DVD "Regeneracija" was founded on 12 March 1956, and the DVD Opće bolnice Zabok on 5 February 2009.

On 8 June 2018, Zabok was hit with golf ball sized hail.

== Geography ==
Zabok is located at 46°1′46″N 15°54′54″E, at an altitude of 186 m above sea level.

=== Climate ===
Since records began in 1991, the highest temperature recorded at the local weather station was 40.8 °C (105.4 °F), on 8 August 2013. The coldest temperature was −22.7 °C (−8.9 °F), on 26 January 2000.

== Demographics ==
In the 2021 census, the town had a total of 8,656 inhabitants. In the same census, 98.14% of the population were Croats.

The following settlements comprise the town's administrative area:

- Bračak, population 18
- Bregi Zabočki Donji, population 81
- Dubrava Zabočka, population 574
- Grdenci, population 439
- Gubaševo, population 258
- Hum Zabočki, population 445
- Jakuševec Zabočki, population 344
- Lug Zabočki, population 580
- Martinišće, population 279
- Pavlovec Zabočki, population 576
- Prosenik Gubaševski, population 160
- Prosenik Začretski, population 130
- Repovec, population 293
- Špičkovina, population 741
- Tisanić Jarek, population 330
- Zabok, population 3,408
Grad Zabok: Population trends 1857–2021
v

population	3195	3708	4086	4664	4978	5558	5422	6025	6852	6990	7583	8696	9002	9394	9365	8994	8656
	1857	1869	1880	1890	1900	1910	1921	1931	1948	1953	1961	1971	1981	1991	2001	2011	2021

Sources: Croatian Bureau of Statistics publications

== Administration ==
The current mayor of Zabok is Valentina Đurek (SDP) and the Zabok Town Council consists of 13 seats.

Groups	Councilors per group
SDP-HSS	7 / 13
HDZ-HSU	5 / 13
Independent	1 / 13

== Culture ==
Zabok is home to monuments to Antun Gustav Matoš and Katarina Zrinska. The soprano Vlatka Oršanić was born in Zabok and received her early music education at the music school there.

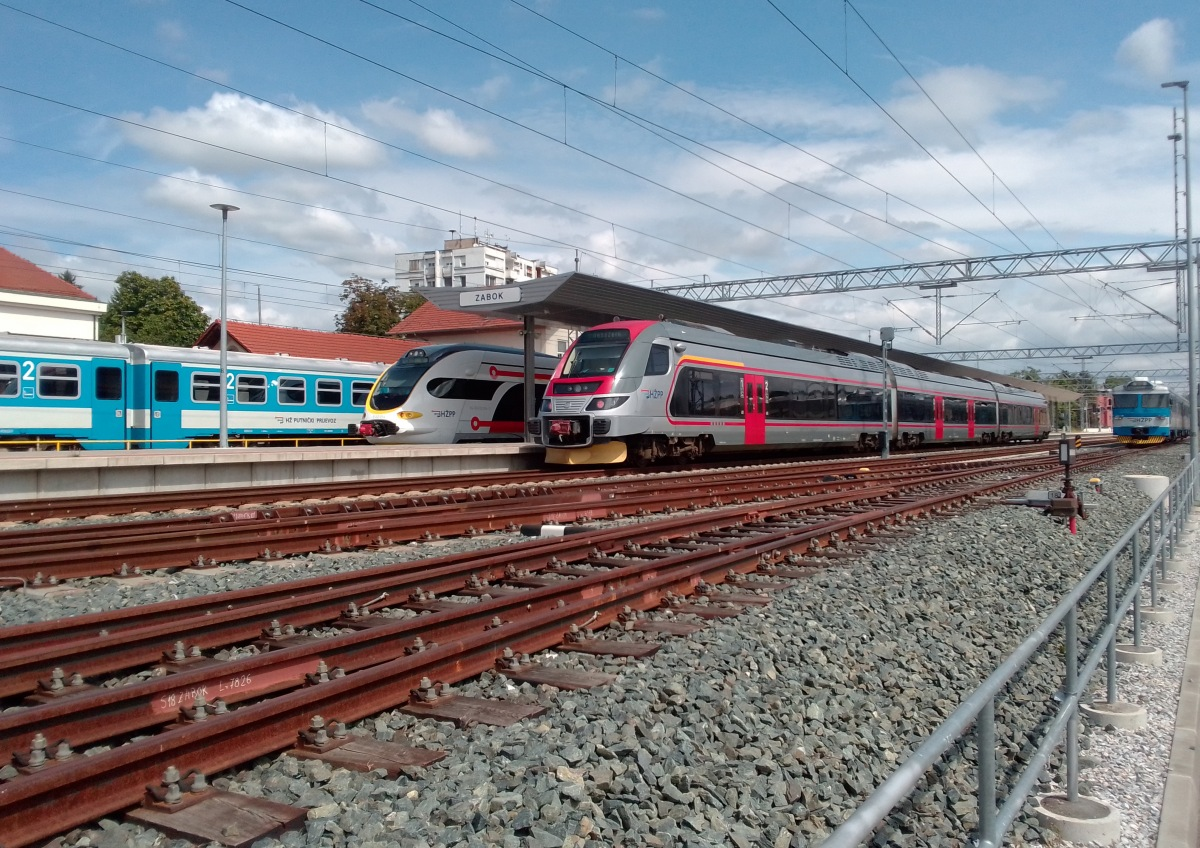
Zabok railway station in August 2022

== Transportation ==
Zabok is the central railway hub of Krapina-Zagorje County. It lies on the corridor R201 (Zaprešić-Čakovec) and also serves as a terminus for railway lines to and from Krapina / state border with Slovenia (R106) and Gornja Stubica (L202).

Zabok bus station is served by buses of the company "Presečki d.o.o." which connect the City of Zabok with numerous cities through county and inter-county lines such as Zabok-Zagreb, Zabok-Zlatar, Zabok-Marija Bistrica, Zabok-Krapina, Zabok-Pregrada, Zabok-Hum na Sutli, Zabok-Bedekovčina and Zabok-Oroslavje.

== Notable people ==
- Ksaver Šandor Gjalski, Croatian novelist
- Siniša Hajdaš Dončić, leader of the SDP and leader of the Opposition, former Minister of Maritime Affairs, Transport and Infrastructure and Prefect of Krapina-Zagorje County
- Vlatka Oršanić, Croatian opera singer

== Literature ==
- Obad Šćitaroci, Mladen; Bojanić Obad Šćitaroci, Bojana; Dundović, Boris (2013). "Manors and Gardens in Northern Croatia in the Age of Historicism" (PDF). Centropa. 13 (2): 175–186. ISSN 1532-5563. Archived from the original (PDF) on 2025-05-05.
