= Dubravica =

Dubravica may refer to:

- Dubravica, Zagreb County, a village and municipality in Croatia
- Dubravica, Požarevac, a village in Serbia
- Dubravica, Čapljina, a village in Bosnia and Herzegovina
- Dubravica, Neum, a village in Bosnia and Herzegovina
- Dubravica, Vitez, a village in Bosnia and Herzegovina
- Dubravica, Zavidovići, a village in Bosnia and Herzegovina
- Dúbravica, a village and a municipality in Slovakia
- Dubravica, Dubrovnik, a village in Croatia
- Dubravica, Metković, a village in Croatia

== See also ==
- Dubrava (disambiguation)
