= Vidice =

Vidice may refer to places in the Czech Republic:

- Vidice (Domažlice District), a municipality and village in the Plzeň Region
- Vidice (Kutná Hora District), a municipality and village in the Central Bohemian Region
