= Dubrave =

Dubrave may refer to:

Bosnia and Herzegovina

- Dubrave, Brčko, village close to Brčko, Bosnia and Herzegovina
- Dubrave, Gradiška
- Dubrave, Glamoč
- Dubrave, Jajce
- Dubrave, Kiseljak
- Dubrave, Aladinići
- Dubrave, polje and village close to Stolac
- Dubrave Donje, a village in Bosnia and Herzegovina
- Dubrave Gornje, a village in Bosnia and Herzegovina

Croatia

- Dubrave, Dubrovnik-Neretva County, a village in Croatia
- Dubrave Donje, a village in Croatia
- Dubrave Gornje, a village in Croatia

== See also ==
- Dubrava (disambiguation)
