= Brynica, Łódź Voivodeship =

Brynica
- Village
- Location within Poland
- Coordinates: 51°45′34″N 19°59′13″E
- Country: Poland
- Voivodeship: Łódź
- County: Brzeziny
- Gmina: Jeżów
- Population: 40

Brynica [brɨˈnit͡sa] is a village in the administrative district of Gmina Jeżów, within Brzeziny County, Łódź Voivodeship, in central Poland. The village lies approximately 7 km (4 mi) south of Jeżów, 17 km (11 mi) east of Brzeziny, and 36 km (22 mi) east of the regional capital Łódź.
