= Śliwno =

Śliwno may refer to the following places:

- Śliwno, Greater Poland Voivodeship (west-central Poland)
- Śliwno, Podlaskie Voivodeship (north-east Poland)
- Śliwno, West Pomeranian Voivodeship (north-west Poland)
