= Kosiska =

Kosiska may refer to the following places in Poland:

- Kosiska, Lower Silesian Voivodeship (south-west Poland)
- Kosiska, Łódź Voivodeship (central Poland)
