= Marianówek =

Marianówek may refer to the following places in Poland:

- Marianówek, Lower Silesian Voivodeship (south-west Poland)
- Marianówek, Łódź Voivodeship (central Poland)
