= Olszewo =

Olszewo may refer to the following places:

- Olszewo, Gmina Boćki in Podlaskie Voivodeship (east Poland)
- Olszewo, Gmina Brańsk in Podlaskie Voivodeship (east Poland)
- Olszewo, Łomża County in Podlaskie Voivodeship (north-east Poland)
- Olszewo, Siemiatycze County in Podlaskie Voivodeship (east Poland)
- Olszewo, Łódź Voivodeship (central Poland)
- Olszewo, Masovian Voivodeship (north-central Poland)
- Olszewo, Konin County in Greater Poland Voivodeship (central Poland)
- Olszewo, Kościan County in Greater Poland Voivodeship (west-central Poland)
- Olszewo, Gmina Środa Wielkopolska, Środa County in Greater Poland Voivodeship (west-central Poland)
- Olszewo, Działdowo County in Warmian-Masurian Voivodeship (north Poland)
- Olszewo, Gmina Prostki in Warmian-Masurian Voivodeship (north-east Poland)
- Olszewo, Gmina Stare Juchy in Warmian-Masurian Voivodeship (north-east Poland)
- Olszewo, Mrągowo County in Warmian-Masurian Voivodeship (north Poland)
- Olszewo, Nidzica County in Warmian-Masurian Voivodeship (north Poland)
- Olszewo, Olecko County in Warmian-Masurian Voivodeship (north-east Poland)
