= Zamłynie =

Zamłynie may refer to the following places:

- Zamłynie, Lesser Poland Voivodeship (south Poland)
- Zamłynie, Brzeziny County in Łódź Voivodeship (central Poland)
- Zamłynie, Zduńska Wola County in Łódź Voivodeship (central Poland)
- Zamłynie, Hrubieszów County in Lublin Voivodeship (east Poland)
- Zamłynie, Gmina Tyszowce, Tomaszów County in Lublin Voivodeship (east Poland)
- Zamłynie, Masovian Voivodeship (east-central Poland)
- Zamłynie, Silesian Voivodeship (south Poland)
