= Władysławowo (disambiguation) =

Władysławowo is a town in Pomeranian Voivodeship (north Poland).

Władysławowo may also refer to:

- Władysławowo, Kuyavian-Pomeranian Voivodeship (north-central Poland)
- Władysławowo, Podlaskie Voivodeship (north-east Poland)
- Władysławowo, Łódź Voivodeship (central Poland)
- Władysławowo, Ciechanów County in Masovian Voivodeship (east-central Poland)
- Władysławowo, Płońsk County in Masovian Voivodeship (east-central Poland)
- Władysławowo, Żuromin County in Masovian Voivodeship (east-central Poland)
- Władysławowo, Gmina Kleczew in Greater Poland Voivodeship (west-central Poland)
- Władysławowo, Gmina Wierzbinek in Greater Poland Voivodeship (west-central Poland)
- Władysławowo, Nowy Tomyśl County in Greater Poland Voivodeship (west-central Poland)
- Władysławowo, Warmian-Masurian Voivodeship (north Poland)
