= Oršanić =

Oršanić (Croatian pronunciation: [ǒrʃanitɕ]) is a Croatian surname. Notable people with the surname include:

- Daniel Orsanic (born 1968), former Argentine tennis player
- Vlatka Oršanić (born 1958), Croatian opera singer and vocal pedagogue
