= Wilhelm Tank =

German illustrator, university teacher and painter (1888–1967)

- Born: 15 June 1888; Kuschlin, Province of Posen, Germany
- Died: 29 September 1967; Berlin
- Occupation(s): Professor of anatomy Artist; Sculptor
- Spouse: Ingeborg Gast/Tank (1914–2005)
- Parent: Emil Tank

Wilhelm Tank (15 June 1888 – 29 September 1967) was a German professor of anatomy, artist and sculptor. His teaching activity over five decades combined with 14 books and more than a hundred articles on scientific and artistic subjects in academic journals, made him one of the more influential figures in his field during the middle part of the twentieth century.

== Life ==
=== Family provenance and early years ===
Tank's came from a traditional East Prussian family with close links to the Protestant Churches Union. His father, Emil Tank, was a Superintendent (senior church administrator) based, by the time of Wilhelm's birth, not in East Prussia but in the village of Kuschlin, at that time in the Prussian Province of Posen. On leaving school he embarked on an apprenticeship in mechanical engineering. He then switched to the Berlin University of the Arts.

It was at the Berlin University of the Arts that his professional career began. He studied anatomy with Hans Virchow. He was also a pupil of Prof. Paul Richer, an academic artist-anatomist whose reputation at that time extended far beyond the borders of France. During and after his student years Tank undertook study tours to Africa, western Asia, southern Russia, England, France, Italy and Spain along with the German-speaking part of central Europe, in order to study the form.

=== Teaching ===
Tank began his own teaching career in 1912. He accepted an appointment as a teacher of anatomical and nude drawing at the Charité (teaching hospital) in Berlin. Assignments at secondary schools and arts colleges followed. Between 1925 and 1936 he had a teaching contract with the German Academy for Body Exercises ("Deutsche Hochschule für Leibesübungen" / DHfL). In 1929 he was appointed to the Berlin University of the Arts. first as an associate professor and later as a full professor. Subsequently, he was giving lectures both at the Berlin University of the Arts and, latterly, at the Free University of Berlin in 1962. Even in retirement Tank continued to lecture at three education establishments.

=== Beyond teaching ===
Tank worked as an artist and illustrator. His anatomical drawings appear in books, and on posters as well as in exhibitions of his work such as the one first staged in 1920. Tank was featured in the Great German Arts Exhibition held in Munich annually between 1937 and 1944. Posthumously presented displays include those at the Galerie Edition Marco in Bonn (1978), the Museum of European Arts (1985) and the Schloss Nörvenich gallery (2003).

He also applied his scholarship ib political film and radio work. In 1928, together with the radio producer Arthur Holz, he developed "Radio gymnastics" and published a booklet of illustrations in support of the first series. With the film producer Wilhelm Prager (1876–1955) he instigated and collaborated on the first in a series of "body culture" films, Ways to Strength and Beauty, designing an elaborate poster to advertise its launch.
