= Mikulin =

Mikulin may refer to:

- Alexander Mikulin, Soviet aircraft-engine designer
- Mikulin, Kraśnik County in Lublin Voivodeship (east Poland)
- Mikulin, Łódź Voivodeship (central Poland)
- Mikulin, Gmina Tyszowce, Tomaszów County in Lublin Voivodeship (east Poland)
- An interglacial period on the East European Plain 130,000–114,000 years ago — see Eemian
