= Dabrava =

Dabrava may refer to:

- Dabrava, Blagoevgrad Province, a village in Bulgaria
- Dabrava, Dobrich Province, a village in Bulgaria
- Dabrava, Lovech Province, a village in Bulgaria
- Dabrava Glacier, Antarctica

== See also ==
- Dubrava (disambiguation)
- Dabravata, a village in Lovech Province, Bulgaria
- Dabravka, a village in Vidin Province, Bulgaria
