= Lubiska =

- Village
- Location within Poland
- Coordinates: 51°45′34″N 19°57′17″E
- Country: Poland
- Voivodeship: Łódź
- County: Brzeziny
- Gmina: Jeżów

Lubiska [luˈbiska] is a village in the administrative district of Gmina Jeżów, within Brzeziny County, Łódź Voivodeship, in central Poland.
