= Trzcianka, Nowy Tomyśl County =

Trzcianka
- Village
- Location within Poland
- Coordinates: 52°23′31″N 16°21′6″E
- Country: Poland
- Voivodeship: Greater Poland
- County: Nowy Tomyśl
- Gmina: Kuślin

Trzcianka [ˈtʂt͡ɕanka] is a village in the administrative district of Gmina Kuślin, within Nowy Tomyśl County, Greater Poland Voivodeship, in west-central Poland.
