= Lubiska-Kolonia =

- Village
- Location within Poland
- Coordinates: 51°46′37″N 19°57′2″E
- Country: Poland
- Voivodeship: Łódź
- County: Brzeziny
- Gmina: Jeżów

Lubiska-Kolonia [luˈbiska kɔˈlɔɲa] is a village in the administrative district of Gmina Jeżów, within Brzeziny County, Łódź Voivodeship, in central Poland.
