= Taurów =

- Village
- Location within Poland
- Coordinates: 51°45′N 19°59′E
- Country: Poland
- Voivodeship: Łódź
- County: Brzeziny
- Gmina: Jeżów

Taurów [ˈtau̯ruf] is a village in the administrative district of Gmina Jeżów, within Brzeziny County, Łódź Voivodeship, in central Poland.
