= Michorzewo =

- Village
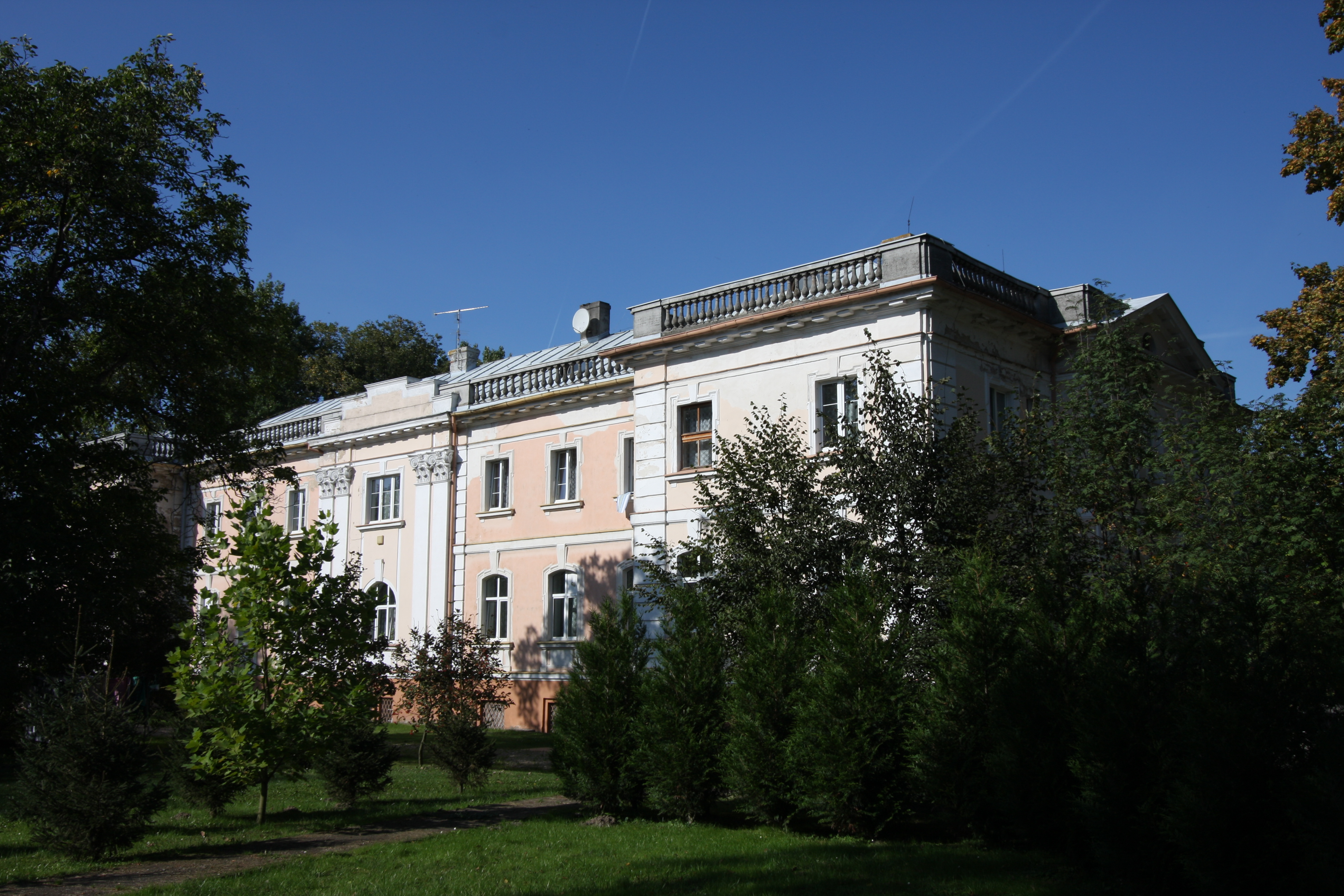
- Michorzewo Palace Wall

- Location within Poland
- Coordinates: 52°22′N 16°22′E
- Country: Poland
- Voivodeship: Greater Poland
- County: Nowy Tomyśl
- Gmina: Kuślin

Michorzewo [mixɔˈʐɛvɔ] is a village in the administrative district of Gmina Kuślin, within Nowy Tomyśl County, Greater Poland Voivodeship, in west-central Poland.
