= Gmina Kuślin =

Gmina Kuślin Kuślin Commune
- Gmina
- Coat of arms

- Location within Poland
- Coordinates (Kuślin): 52°22′N 16°19′E
- Country: Poland
- Voivodeship: Greater Poland
- County: Nowy Tomyśl
- Seat: Kuślin

Area
  - Total: 106.31 km^{2} (41.05 sq mi)

Population (2011)
  - Total: 5,636
  - Density: 53.01/km^{2} (137.3/sq mi)
- Website: www.kuslin.bazagmin.pl

Gmina Kuślin is a rural gmina (administrative district) in Nowy Tomyśl County, Greater Poland Voivodeship, in west-central Poland. Its seat is the village of Kuślin, which lies approximately 14 kilometres (9 mi) north-east of Nowy Tomyśl and 41 km (25 mi) west of the regional capital Poznań.

The gmina covers an area of 106.31 square kilometres (41.0 sq mi), and as of 2006 its total population is 5,571.

== Villages ==
Gmina Kuślin contains the villages and settlements of Chraplewo, Dąbrowa, Głuponie, Krystianowo, Kuślin, Michorzewko, Michorzewo, Nowa Dąbrowa, Śliwno, Trzcianka, Turkowo and Wąsowo.

== Neighbouring gminas ==
Gmina Kuślin is bordered by the gminas of Duszniki, Lwówek, Nowy Tomyśl and Opalenica.
