= Bregi Zabočki Donji =

Settlement in Krapina-Zagorje County, Croatia

- Settlement
- Interactive map of Bregi Zabočki Donji
- Location of Bregi Zabočki Donji in Croatia
- Coordinates: 46°02′N 15°54′E
- Country: Croatia
- County: Krapina-Zagorje
- City: Zabok

Area
  - Total: 0.5 km^{2} (0.19 sq mi)

Population (2021)
  - Total: 81
  - Density: 160/km^{2} (420/sq mi)
- Time zone: UTC+1 (CET)
  - Summer (DST): UTC+2 (CEST)
- Postal code: 49210 Zabok
- Area code: +385 (0)49

Bregi Zabočki Donji is a settlement in the City of Zabok in Croatia. In 2021, its population was 81.
