= Dumbrăvița =

Dumbrăvița may refer to the following places:

== Romania ==
- Dumbrăvița, Brașov, a commune in Brașov County
- Dumbrăvița, Maramureș, a commune in Maramureș County
- Dumbrăvița, Timiș, a commune in Timiș County
- Dumbrăvița, a village in Ceru-Băcăinți Commune, Alba County
- Dumbrăvița, a village in Bârzava, Arad Commune, Arad County
- Dumbrăvița, a village in Holod, Bihor Commune, Bihor County
- Dumbrăvița, a village in Spermezeu Commune, Bistrița-Năsăud County
- Dumbrăvița, a village in Ibănești, Botoșani Commune, Botoșani County
- Dumbrăvița, a village in Ilia, Hunedoara Commune, Hunedoara County
- Dumbrăvița, a village in Ruginoasa, Iași Commune, Iași County
- Dumbrăvița, a village in Husnicioara Commune, Mehedinți County
- Dumbrăvița, a village in Vadu Moldovei Commune, Suceava County
- Dumbrăvița de Codru, a village in Șoimi Commune, Bihor County
- Dumbrăvița, a tributary of the Crișul Alb in Arad County
- Dumbrăvița (Ilișua), a tributary of the Ilișua in Bistrița-Năsăud County

== Moldova ==
- Dumbrăvița, Sîngerei, a commune in Sîngerei district

== See also ==
- Dumbrava (disambiguation)
- Dumbrăveni (disambiguation)
