= Repovec =

Settlement in Krapina-Zagorje County, Croatia

- Settlement
- Interactive map of Repovec
- Location of Repovec in Croatia
- Coordinates: 46°01′30″N 15°53′24″E
- Country: Croatia
- County: Krapina-Zagorje
- City: Zabok

Area
  - Total: 1.3 km^{2} (0.50 sq mi)

Population (2021)
  - Total: 293
  - Density: 230/km^{2} (580/sq mi)
- Time zone: UTC+1 (CET)
  - Summer (DST): UTC+2 (CEST)
- Postal code: 49210 Zabok
- Area code: +385 (0)49

Repovec is a settlement in the City of Zabok in Croatia. In 2021, its population was 293.

== Demographics ==
Repovec: Population trends 1857–2021
v

population	147	184	190	185	193	218	194	230	239	229	264	287	297	321	340	312	293
	1857	1869	1880	1890	1900	1910	1921	1931	1948	1953	1961	1971	1981	1991	2001	2011	2021

Sources: Croatian Bureau of Statistics publications
