= Frydrychów, Łódź Voivodeship =

Frydrychów
- Village
- Location within Poland
- Coordinates: 51°46′34″N 19°56′33″E
- Country: Poland
- Voivodeship: Łódź
- County: Brzeziny
- Gmina: Jeżów

Frydrychów [frɨˈdrɨxuf] is a village in the administrative district of Gmina Jeżów, within Brzeziny County, Łódź Voivodeship, in central Poland.
