= Martinišće =

Settlement in Krapina-Zagorje County, Croatia

- Settlement
- Interactive map of Martinišće
- Location of Martinišće in Croatia
- Coordinates: 46°01′48″N 15°51′36″E
- Country: Croatia
- County: Krapina-Zagorje
- City: Zabok

Area
  - Total: 2.2 km^{2} (0.85 sq mi)

Population (2021)
  - Total: 279
  - Density: 130/km^{2} (330/sq mi)
- Time zone: UTC+1 (CET)
  - Summer (DST): UTC+2 (CEST)
- Postal code: 49210 Zabok
- Area code: +385 (0)49

Martinišće is a settlement in the City of Zabok in Croatia. In 2021, its population was 279.

== Demographics ==
Martinišće: Population trends 1857–2021
v

population	193	200	242	263	292	345	322	342	370	382	373	335	331	343	360	338	279
	1857	1869	1880	1890	1900	1910	1921	1931	1948	1953	1961	1971	1981	1991	2001	2011	2021

Sources: Croatian Bureau of Statistics publications
