= Stare Leszczyny =

- Village
- Location within Poland
- Coordinates: 51°46′44″N 19°52′51″E
- Country: Poland
- Voivodeship: Łódź
- County: Brzeziny
- Gmina: Jeżów

Stare Leszczyny [ˈstarɛ lɛʂˈt͡ʂɨnɨ] is a village in the administrative district of Gmina Jeżów, within Brzeziny County, Łódź Voivodeship, in central Poland.
