= Dumbrava =

Dumbrava may refer to:

in Romania

- Dumbrava, Mehedinți, a commune in Mehedinţi County, and its villages of Dumbrava de Jos, Dumbrava de Mijloc and Dumbrava de Sus
- Dumbrava, Prahova, a commune in Prahova County
- Dumbrava, Timiș, a commune in Timiș County
- Dumbrava, a village in Săsciori Commune, Alba County
- Dumbrava, a village in Zlatna Town, Alba County
- Dumbrava, a village in Unirea Commune, Alba County
- Dumbrava, a village in Pleșcuța Commune, Arad County
- Dumbrava, a village in Bogați Commune, Argeș County
- Dumbrava, a village in Gura Văii Commune, Bacău County
- Dumbrava, a village in Itești Commune, Bacău County
- Dumbrava, a village in Holod Commune, Bihor County
- Dumbrava, a village in Răchitoasa Commune, Bacău County
- Dumbrava, a village in Livezile Commune, Bistriţa-Năsăud County
- Dumbrava, a village in Nușeni Commune, Bistriţa-Năsăud County
- Dumbrava, a village in Căpușu Mare Commune, Cluj County
- Dumbrava, a village in Ulmi Commune, Dâmboviţa County
- Dumbrava, a village in Pestișu Mic Commune, Hunedoara County
- Dumbrava, a village in Ciurea Commune, Iaşi County
- Dumbrava, a village in Lespezi Commune, Iaşi County
- Dumbrava, a village in Târgu Lăpuş town, Maramureș County
- Dumbrava, a village in Vătava Commune, Mureș County
- Dumbrava, a village in Timișești Commune, Neamţ County
- Dumbrava, a village in Livada Town, Satu Mare County
- Dumbrava, a village in Cornu Luncii Commune, Suceava County
- Dumbrava, a village in Grănicești Commune, Suceava County
- Dumbrava, a village in Lungești Commune, Vâlcea County
- Dumbrava, a village in Panciu Town, Vrancea County
- Dumbrava, a village in Poiana Cristei Commune, Vrancea County
- Limba, a village in Ciugud Commune, Alba County, called Dumbrava from 1958 to 2004
- Dumbrava (river), a tributary of the Pereschivul Mic in Vaslui County

Additionally, two places in Romania are known in Hungarian as Dumbráva:

- Custura village, Cășeiu Commune, Cluj County
- Dumbrava village, Livezile Commune, Bistriţa-Năsăud County

in Moldova

- Dumbrava, Chișinău, a village in Truşeni Commune, Chişinău Municipality

in Ukraine

- Dumbrava, the Romanian name for Dibrivka village, Stara Zhadova Commune, Storozhynets Raion, Ukraine

== See also ==
- Dumbrăveni (disambiguation)
- Dumbrăvița (disambiguation)
- Dubrava (disambiguation)
