= Rewica Królewska =

- Village
- Location within Poland
- Coordinates: 51°44′29″N 19°56′41″E
- Country: Poland
- Voivodeship: Łódź
- County: Brzeziny
- Gmina: Jeżów
- Population: 40

Rewica Królewska [rɛˈvit͡sa kruˈlɛfska] is a village in the administrative district of Gmina Jeżów, within Brzeziny County, Łódź Voivodeship, in central Poland.
