= Jakuševec Zabočki =

Settlement in Krapina-Zagorje County, Croatia

- Settlement
- Interactive map of Jakuševec Zabočki
- Location of Jakuševec Zabočki in Croatia
- Coordinates: 46°01′52″N 15°52′55″E
- Country: Croatia
- County: Krapina-Zagorje
- City: Zabok

Area
  - Total: 1.6 km^{2} (0.62 sq mi)

Population (2021)
  - Total: 344
  - Density: 220/km^{2} (560/sq mi)
- Time zone: UTC+1 (CET)
  - Summer (DST): UTC+2 (CEST)
- Postal code: 49210 Zabok
- Area code: +385 (0)49

Jakuševec Zabočki is a settlement in the City of Zabok in Croatia. In 2021, its population was 344.

== Demographics ==
Jakuševec Zabočki: Population trends 1857–2021
v

population	191	223	241	264	293	287	305	308	307	325	361	399	351	382	383	364	344
	1857	1869	1880	1890	1900	1910	1921	1931	1948	1953	1961	1971	1981	1991	2001	2011	2021

Sources: Croatian Bureau of Statistics publications
