= Ways to Strength and Beauty =

1925 film

Ways to Strength and Beauty – A film about modern physical culture
- German theatrical release poster design: Wilhelm Tank, 1926
- Wege zu Kraft und Schönheit – Ein Film über moderne Körperkultur
- Directed by: Wilhelm Prager
- Written by: Nicholas Kaufmann
- Screenplay by: Wilhelm Prager; Nicholas Kaufmann; Ernst Krieger
- Produced by: Alfred Stern, Ufa-Kulturabteilung
- Starring: Dussia Bereska (Rudolf von Laban Dance School, Hamburg); Rudolf Bode; Kitty Cauer; Jack Dempsey; David Lloyd George; Jenny Hasselquist; Gerhart Hauptmann; Camilla Horn; Niddy Impekoven; Baku Ishii; Konami Ishii; La Jana; Tamara Karsavina; Nick Kaufmann (Father of the film script writer); Rocky Knight; Rudolf Kobs; Rudolf von Laban and his dance group; Eva Liebenberg; Hans Luber; Bess Mensendieck; Loren Murchison; Benito Mussolini; Ellen Petz; Arthur Porrit; Leni Riefenstahl; Babe Ruth; Carolina de la Riva; Hertha von Walther; Johnny Weissmuller; Mary Wigman and her dance group; Carr Wills; Helen Wills; Peter Wladimiroff
- Cinematography: Friedrich Weinmann; Eugen Herich; Friedrich Paulmann; Jakob Schatzow (slow motion); Erich Stöcker (slow motion)
- Music by: Giuseppe Becce
- Production companies: Ufa-Kulturabteilung; Universum-Film Aktiengesellschaft (Ufa)
- Distributed by: Oefa-Film Verleih
- Release date: 16 March 1925 (Berlin)
- Running time: 125 minutes
- Country: Germany
- Languages: Silent film, German intertitles

Ways to Strength and Beauty (German: Wege zu Kraft und Schönheit) is a 1925 German cultural film directed by Wilhelm Prager. The 125 minute full-length silent film was produced by Ufa-Kulturabteilung of Weimar Germany. The film was first screened on 16 March 1925 and in a revised version on 11 June 1926 in the Ufa-Palast am Zoo in Berlin.

The documentary was an idealized, somewhat naive depiction of health and beauty in conformity with nature. The film offered a contrast to the rather hopeless lifestyles available in Berlin and other large cities of Germany during the 1920s and became an immediate success. It was the most popular and important German kulturfilm (cultural film) of this period.

== Plot ==
The full-length silent film conceived in the UFA's cultural department shows sport, gymnastics and dance performances, but also the Roman bathing culture, in order to demonstrate not only intellectual education but also physical fitness based on the example of ancient gymnasiums and personal grooming. Physical exercise in the great outdoors was intended for preventive healthcare and prevent postural damage in adults caused by imbalanced seated occupations and the health promotion of children, but it was also a life-reforming (Lebensreform) alternative to the decadence of city life with anxieties, lack of exercise and tobacco consumption as well as national movement based on the model of gymnastics father Friedrich Ludwig Jahn. The film's scientific advisor was the German physician Nicholas Kaufmann, who also wrote the script. In contrast to traditional military sports, the film expressly addresses women, for example with gymnastics according to Bess Mensendieck, and shows sports training in a civilian function, for example for self-defense or rescue swimming.

Aesthetically, the film stages the human body in the style of classical antiquity by recreating numerous ancient scenarios and shows it extremely freely for the time. Studies in slow motion illustrate the muscular effect of individual exercises and movement sequences. The film features the first on-camera appearance of Leni Riefenstahl.

The film is divided into six parts with the titles:

- Part one: The Ancient Greeks and the New Era
- Part two: physical training for the sake of health: hygienic gymnastics
- Part three: rhythmic gymnastics
- Part four: the dance
- Part five: sport
- Part six: fresh air, sun and water

In the fifth part, numerous athletes of their time are shown, for example:

- High jump: Leroy Brown (U.S.), 1924 Summer Olympics in Paris, 1.96 meters
- Charlie Paddock, America's best sprinter training
- Hubert Houben (Germany) beats the Olympic champions Paddock and Murchison (U.S.) as well as Porritt and Carr (Australia) in the 100-meter sprint
- H.H. Meyer, America's best hurdler
- Fencing: The Nadis' from Livorno, a family of famous fencers
  - Aldo Nadi, the Italian champion
  - Nedo Nadi, the world champion, winner of the 1912 Summer Olympics in Stockholm and 1920 Summer Olympics in Antwerp

In the sixth part "a good example of national leaders" like:

- Arthur James Balfour playing tennis and
- David Lloyd George playing golf, as well
- John D. Rockefeller playing golf at the age of 85
- the Norwegian royal family on skis
- Benito Mussolini on horseback (later cut out) as well as
- the German poet and Nobel Prize in Literature Gerhart Hauptmann and his wife on the beach in Rapallo

== Reception ==
As an expression of body awareness that enjoyed general popularity since 1900 in the form of Freikörperkultur (free body culture), the Lebensreform (life-reform) movement and naturism, the film reached a mass audience in the Weimar Republic and was recognized as a rashly popular "large-scale advertising film". Various advisory journals on the subject of physical culture appeared at the same time.

The film was largely positively received in contemporary reviews, although it was criticized as too long and kitschy in some scenes. All in all, the film is about "the endeavors to ensure the proper care and training of the body" in large parts of the population, especially women with office activities in the expanding service sector. It is said to be of a "pure basic mood" and "far removed from arousing any offensive feelings with a fine tact" or to appear too instructive.

Because of its "overall immoral effect" especially on young people through a "glorification of nude culture and nude exercises", the Bavarian government, to which the governments of Baden and Hesse had joined, applied for the revocation of admission to public screening in the German Reich, at least in Bavaria and before the youth. The application was rejected by the Film Review Office, in regard to the protection of minors, only two film scenes had to be cut out "with the sheer display of naked female body beauty, that up to 'undressed' intensifies". For the normally perceived adult observer, if the film is viewed in an unbiased manner, there is no overall sexual incentive.

In retrospect, due to its "idolatry" of the human body, the film is regarded as the ideological forerunner of the National Socialist body cult, as celebrated not least in Leni Riefenstahl's later propaganda films. In Ways to Strength and Beauty, Riefenstahl made an appearance as a topless extra in a group of ancient Greek dancers. The entire opening sequences of both parts of Riefenstahl's later Olympic film are almost "a copy of Ways to Strength and Beauty".

As a historical documentary film about the emergence of rhythmic gymnastics as a mass sport, which marked such a fundamental change in movement behaviour at the beginning of the 20th century that it triggered a new physical culture, the film stylized physical exercise and represents "an interesting document in terms of film history".

== Film technical specifications ==
- Aspect ratio: 1.33:1
- Sound type: Silent
- Colour type: Black and white
- Width: 35 mm
- Frames per second: 18
- Length in metres: 2567
- Length in minutes: 125
- Reels: 6 rolls

== Bibliography ==
- "Wege zu Kraft und Schönheit : Ein Film über moderne Körperkultur (1925)" [Ways to Strength and Beauty – A film about modern physical culture]. Stockholm: The Swedish Film Database: Swedish Film Institute.
