= Wąsowo =

- Village
- Location within Poland
- Coordinates: 52°22′N 16°15′E
- Country: Poland
- Voivodeship: Greater Poland
- County: Nowy Tomyśl
- Gmina: Kuślin
- Population: 1,100

Wąsowo [vɔ̃ˈsɔvɔ] is a village in the administrative district of Gmina Kuślin, within Nowy Tomyśl County, Greater Poland Voivodeship, in west-central Poland.
