= Prosenik Začretski =

Settlement in Krapina-Zagorje County, Croatia

- Settlement
- Interactive map of Prosenik Začretski
- Location of Prosenik Začretski in Croatia
- Coordinates: 46°03′29″N 15°52′48″E
- Country: Croatia
- County: Krapina-Zagorje
- City: Zabok

Area
  - Total: 2.2 km^{2} (0.85 sq mi)

Population (2021)
  - Total: 130
  - Density: 59/km^{2} (150/sq mi)
- Time zone: UTC+1 (CET)
  - Summer (DST): UTC+2 (CEST)
- Postal code: 49210 Zabok
- Area code: +385 (0)49

Prosenik Začretski is a settlement in the City of Zabok in Croatia. In 2021, its population was 130.

== Demographics ==
Prosenik Začretski: Population trends 1857–2021
v

population	125	180	222	266	315	362	391	449	435	414	364	348	285	240	191	158	130
	1857	1869	1880	1890	1900	1910	1921	1931	1948	1953	1961	1971	1981	1991	2001	2011	2021

Sources: Croatian Bureau of Statistics publications
