= Mikulin-Parcela =

- Village
- Location within Poland
- Coordinates: 51°48′N 19°59′E
- Country: Poland
- Voivodeship: Łódź
- County: Brzeziny
- Gmina: Jeżów
- Population: 32

Mikulin-Parcela [miˈkulin parˈt͡sɛla] is a village in the administrative district of Gmina Jeżów, within Brzeziny County, Łódź Voivodeship, in central Poland.
