= Jankowice-Kolonia =

- Village
- Location within Poland
- Coordinates: 51°46′21″N 19°59′41″E
- Country: Poland
- Voivodeship: Łódź
- County: Brzeziny
- Gmina: Jeżów

Jankowice-Kolonia [jankɔˈvit͡sɛ kɔˈlɔɲa] is a village in the administrative district of Gmina Jeżów, within Brzeziny County, Łódź Voivodeship, in central Poland.
