= Jasienin Duży =

- Village
- Location within Poland
- Coordinates: 51°49′16″N 19°56′30″E
- Country: Poland
- Voivodeship: Łódź
- County: Brzeziny
- Gmina: Jeżów

Jasienin Duży [jaˈɕɛnin ˈduʐɨ] is a village in the administrative district of Gmina Jeżów, within Brzeziny County, Łódź Voivodeship, in central Poland.
