= Bračak =

Settlement in Krapina-Zagorje County, Croatia

- Settlement
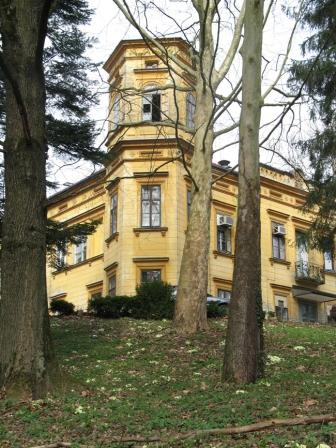
- Bračak castle
- Interactive map of Bračak
- Location of Bračak in Croatia
- Coordinates: 46°01′01″N 15°56′13″E
- Country: Croatia
- County: Krapina-Zagorje
- City: Zabok

Area
  - Total: 1.2 km^{2} (0.46 sq mi)

Population (2021)
  - Total: 18
  - Density: 15/km^{2} (39/sq mi)
- Time zone: UTC+1 (CET)
  - Summer (DST): UTC+2 (CEST)
- Postal code: 49210 Zabok
- Area code: +385 (0)49

Bračak is a settlement in the City of Zabok in Croatia. In 2021, its population was 18.

== Demographics ==
Bračak: Population trends 1857–2021
v

population				20	19	18	26	2	20	43	41	100	37	34	36	21	18
	1857	1869	1880	1890	1900	1910	1921	1931	1948	1953	1961	1971	1981	1991	2001	2011	2021

Sources: Croatian Bureau of Statistics publications
