= Przybyszyce =

- Village
- Location within Poland
- Coordinates: 51°49′44″N 19°59′31″E
- Country: Poland
- Voivodeship: Łódź
- County: Brzeziny
- Gmina: Jeżów
- Population (approx.): 210

Przybyszyce [pʂɨbɨˈʂɨt͡sɛ] is a village in the administrative district of Gmina Jeżów, within Brzeziny County, Łódź Voivodeship, in central Poland.

The village has an approximate population of 210.
