= Popień, Gmina Jeżów =

Popień
- Village
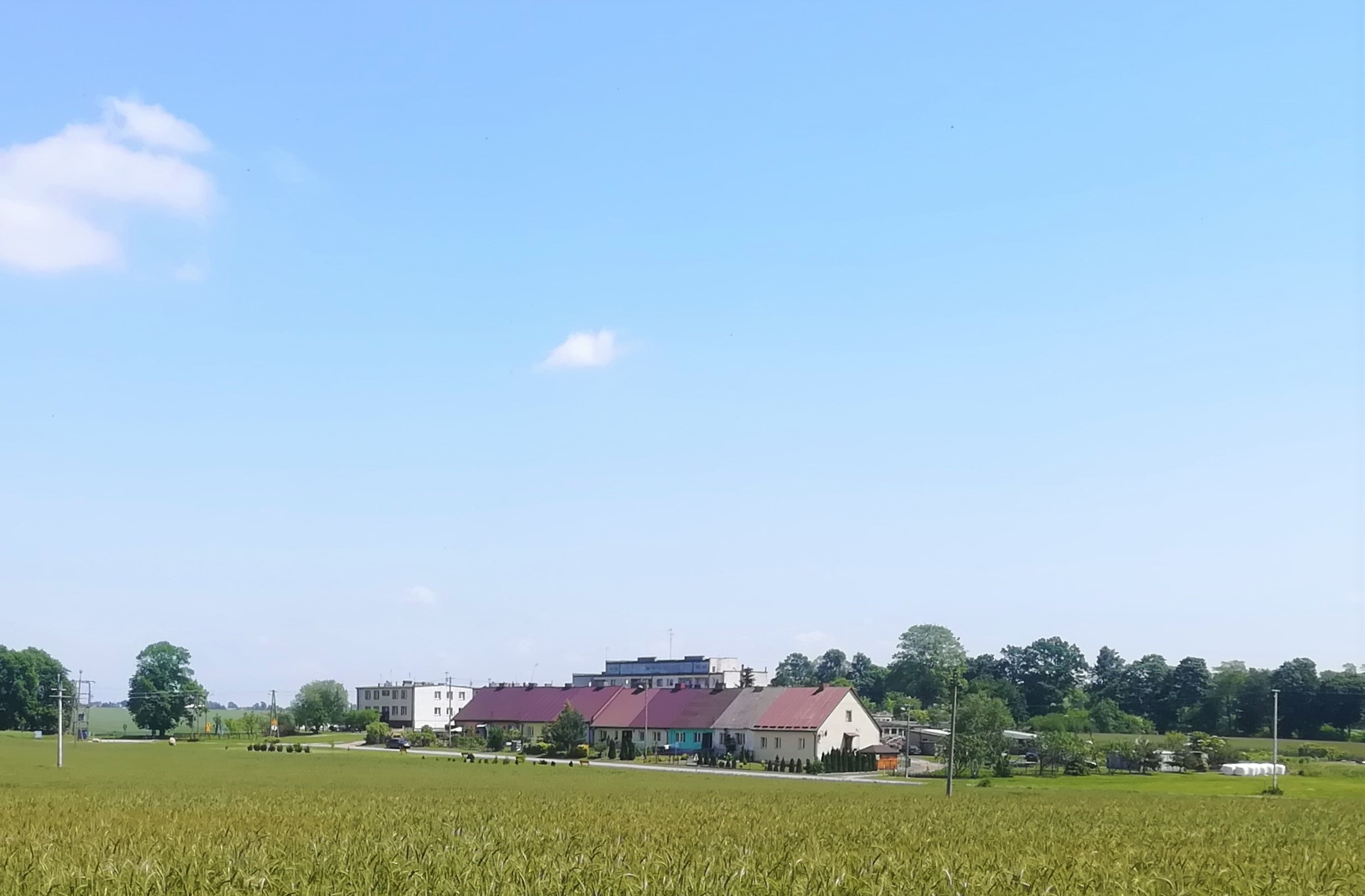

- Location within Poland
- Coordinates: 51°47′11″N 19°56′00″E
- Country: Poland
- Voivodeship: Łódź
- County: Brzeziny
- Gmina: Jeżów

Popień [ˈpɔpjɛɲ] is a village in the administrative district of Gmina Jeżów, within Brzeziny County, Łódź Voivodeship, in central Poland.
