= Strzelna =

- Village
- Location within Poland
- Coordinates: 51°49′N 19°56′E
- Country: Poland
- Voivodeship: Łódź
- County: Brzeziny
- Gmina: Jeżów

Strzelna [ˈstʂɛlna] is a village in the administrative district of Gmina Jeżów, within Brzeziny County, Łódź Voivodeship, in central Poland.

== Administration ==
From 1975 to 1998, the village was administratively attached to the former Skierniewice voivodeship.

Since 1999, it has been part of the new Łódź voivodeship.
