= Jasienin Mały =

- Village
- Location within Poland
- Coordinates: 51°48′59″N 19°56′34″E
- Country: Poland
- Voivodeship: Łódź
- County: Brzeziny
- Gmina: Jeżów

Jasienin Mały [jaˈɕɛnin ˈmawɨ] is a village in the administrative district of Gmina Jeżów, within Brzeziny County, Łódź Voivodeship, in central Poland.
