= Mościska, Łódź Voivodeship =

Mościska
- Village
- Location within Poland
- Coordinates: 51°46′54″N 19°57′53″E
- Country: Poland
- Voivodeship: Łódź
- County: Brzeziny
- Gmina: Jeżów

Mościska [mɔɕˈt͡ɕiska] is a village in the administrative district of Gmina Jeżów, within Brzeziny County, Łódź Voivodeship, in central Poland.
