= Prosenik Gubaševski =

Settlement in Krapina-Zagorje County, Croatia

- Settlement
- Interactive map of Prosenik Gubaševski
- Location of Prosenik Gubaševski in Croatia
- Coordinates: 46°01′59″N 15°52′05″E
- Country: Croatia
- County: Krapina-Zagorje
- City: Zabok

Area
  - Total: 1.9 km^{2} (0.73 sq mi)

Population (2021)
  - Total: 160
  - Density: 84/km^{2} (220/sq mi)
- Time zone: UTC+1 (CET)
  - Summer (DST): UTC+2 (CEST)
- Postal code: 49210 Zabok
- Area code: +385 (0)49

Prosenik Gubaševski is a settlement in the City of Zabok in Croatia. In 2021, its population was 160.

== Demographics ==
Prosenik Gubaševski: Population trends 1857–2021
v

population	170	184	226	242	267	315	306	285	269	245	233	196	188	195	175	155	160
	1857	1869	1880	1890	1900	1910	1921	1931	1948	1953	1961	1971	1981	1991	2001	2011	2021

Sources: Croatian Bureau of Statistics publications
