= Gmina Jeżów =

Gmina Jeżów Jeżów Commune
- Gmina
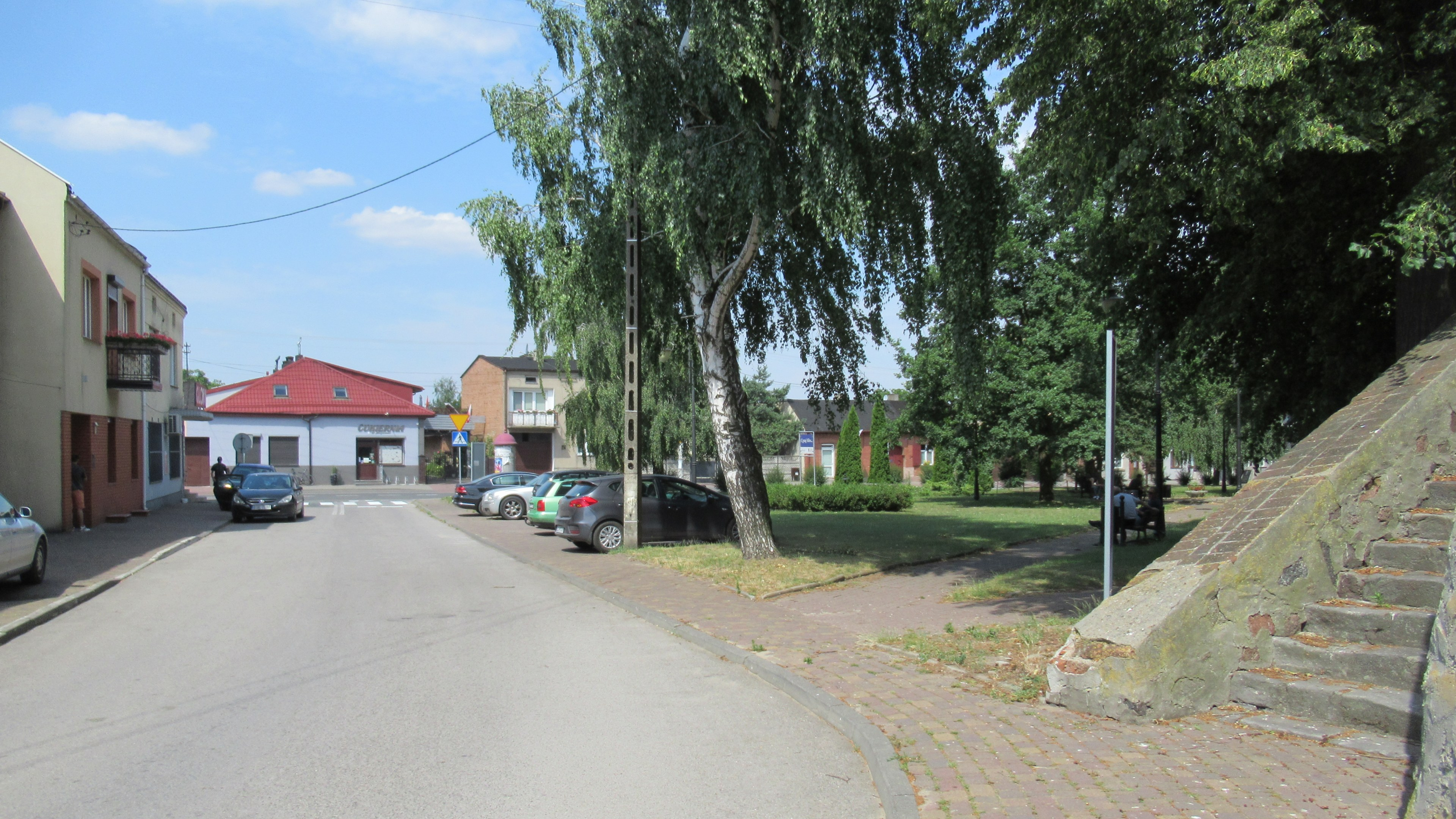

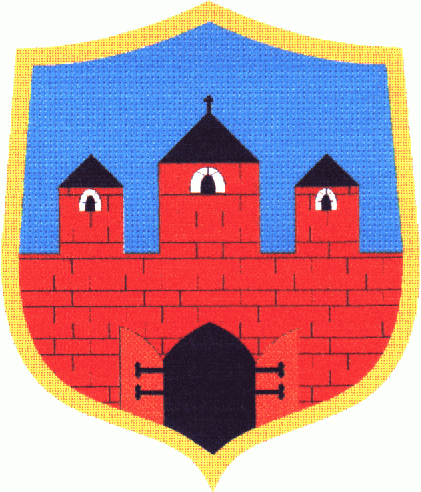
- Coat of arms
- Interactive map of Gmina Jeżów
- Coordinates (Jeżów): 51°48′49″N 19°58′7″E
- Country: Poland
- Voivodeship: Łódź
- County: Brzeziny
- Seat: Jeżów

Area
  - Total: 63.8 km^{2} (24.6 sq mi)

Population (2006)
  - Total: 3,633
  - Density: 56.9/km^{2} (147/sq mi)
- Time zone: UTC+1 (CET)
  - Summer (DST): UTC+2 (CEST)
- Website: www.jezow.pl

Gmina Jeżów is an urban-rural gmina (administrative district) in Brzeziny County, Łódź Voivodeship, in central Poland. Its seat is the village of Jeżów, which lies approximately 16 kilometres (10 mi) east of Brzeziny and 35 km (22 mi) east of the regional capital Łódź.

The gmina covers an area of 63.8 square kilometres (24.6 sq mi), and as of 2006 its total population is 3,633.

== Villages ==
Gmina Jeżów contains the villages and settlements of:

- Brynica
- Dąbrowa
- Frydrychów
- Góra
- Jankowice
- Jankowice-Kolonia
- Jasienin Duży
- Jasienin Mały
- Jeżów
- Kosiska
- Leszczyny
- Lubiska
- Lubiska-Kolonia
- Marianówek
- Mikulin
- Mikulin-Parcela
- Mościska
- Olszewo
- Popień
- Popień-Parcela
- Przybyszyce
- Rewica
- Rewica Królewska
- Rewica Szlachecka
- Rewica-Kolonia
- Stare Leszczyny
- Strzelna
- Taurów
- Władysławowo
- Wola Łokotowa
- Zamłynie

== Neighbouring gminas ==
Gmina Jeżów is bordered by the gminas of Głuchów, Koluszki, Rogów, Słupia and Żelechlinek.
