= Tisanić Jarek =

Settlement in Krapina-Zagorje County, Croatia

- Settlement
- Interactive map of Tisanić Jarek
- Location of Tisanić Jarek in Croatia
- Coordinates: 46°02′24″N 15°53′20″E
- Country: Croatia
- County: Krapina-Zagorje
- City: Zabok

Area
  - Total: 1.2 km^{2} (0.46 sq mi)

Population (2021)
  - Total: 330
  - Density: 280/km^{2} (710/sq mi)
- Time zone: UTC+1 (CET)
  - Summer (DST): UTC+2 (CEST)
- Postal code: 49210 Zabok
- Area code: +385 (0)49

Tisanić Jarek is a settlement in the City of Zabok in Croatia. In 2021, its population was 330.

== Demographics ==
Tisanić Jarek: Population trends 1857–2021
v

population	145	169	188	239	226	266	270	325	326	329	367	297	342	350	342	345	330
	1857	1869	1880	1890	1900	1910	1921	1931	1948	1953	1961	1971	1981	1991	2001	2011	2021

Sources: Croatian Bureau of Statistics publications
