= Krystianowo =

- Village
- Location within Poland
- Coordinates: 52°22′25″N 16°23′30″E
- Country: Poland
- Voivodeship: Greater Poland
- County: Nowy Tomyśl
- Gmina: Kuślin

Krystianowo [krɨstjaˈnɔvɔ] is a village in the administrative district of Gmina Kuślin, within Nowy Tomyśl County, Greater Poland Voivodeship, in west-central Poland.
