= Jankowice, Brzeziny County =

Jankowice
- Village
- Location within Poland
- Coordinates: 51°46′10″N 19°59′34″E
- Country: Poland
- Voivodeship: Łódź
- County: Brzeziny
- Gmina: Jeżów

Jankowice [jankɔˈvit͡sɛ] is a village in the administrative district of Gmina Jeżów, within Brzeziny County, Łódź Voivodeship, in central Poland.
