= Dumbrăveni (disambiguation) =

Dumbrăveni may refer to several places in Romania:

- Dumbrăveni, Sibiu County, a town
- Dumbrăveni, a commune in Constanța County
- Dumbrăveni, a commune in Suceava County
- Dumbrăveni, a commune in Vrancea County
- Dumbrăveni, a village in Ciceu-Giurgești Commune, Bistrița-Năsăud County
- Dumbrăveni, a village in Crasna Commune, Gorj County
- Dumbrăveni, a village in Balotești Commune, Ilfov County
- Dumbrăveni, a village in Râșca Commune, Suceava County
- Dumbrăveni, a village in Gârceni Commune, Vaslui County

and to:

- Dumbrăveni, a village in Vădeni Commune, Soroca district, Moldova

== See also ==
- Dumbrava (disambiguation)
- Dumbrăvița (disambiguation)
