= Leszczyny, Łódź Voivodeship =

Leszczyny
- Village
- Location within Poland
- Coordinates: 51°47′14″N 19°54′8″E
- Country: Poland
- Voivodeship: Łódź
- County: Brzeziny
- Gmina: Jeżów
- Population: 40

Leszczyny [lɛʂˈt͡ʂɨnɨ] is a village in the administrative district of Gmina Jeżów, within Brzeziny County, Łódź Voivodeship, in central Poland.
