= Rewica-Kolonia =

- Village
- Location within Poland
- Coordinates: 51°44′5″N 19°55′14″E
- Country: Poland
- Voivodeship: Łódź
- County: Brzeziny
- Gmina: Jeżów

Rewica-Kolonia [rɛˈvit͡sa kɔˈlɔɲa] is a village in the administrative district of Gmina Jeżów, within Brzeziny County, Łódź Voivodeship, in central Poland.
