= Lug Zabočki =

Settlement in Krapina-Zagorje County, Croatia

- Settlement
- Interactive map of Lug Zabočki
- Location of Lug Zabočki in Croatia
- Coordinates: 46°01′19″N 15°55′05″E
- Country: Croatia
- County: Krapina-Zagorje
- City: Zabok

Area
  - Total: 2.7 km^{2} (1.0 sq mi)

Population (2021)
  - Total: 580
  - Density: 210/km^{2} (560/sq mi)
- Time zone: UTC+1 (CET)
  - Summer (DST): UTC+2 (CEST)
- Postal code: 49210 Zabok
- Area code: +385 (0)49

Lug Zabočki is a settlement in the City of Zabok in Croatia. In 2021, its population was 580.

== History ==
On 27 March 2022 at 19:34 the ŽVOC Zabok received a call about a wildfire in the area. 12.25 hectares (30.3 acres) burned by the time it was put out at 21:28 by DVD Zabok.

== Demographics ==
Lug Zabočki: Population trends 1857–2021
v

population	53	60	76	121	118	133	139	175	236	231	298	405	471	510	535	585	580
	1857	1869	1880	1890	1900	1910	1921	1931	1948	1953	1961	1971	1981	1991	2001	2011	2021

Sources: Croatian Bureau of Statistics publications
