= Rewica Szlachecka =

- Village
- Location within Poland
- Coordinates: 51°44′30″N 19°55′37″E
- Country: Poland
- Voivodeship: Łódź
- County: Brzeziny
- Gmina: Jeżów

Rewica Szlachecka [rɛˈvit͡sa ʂlaˈxɛt͡ska] is a village in the administrative district of Gmina Jeżów, within Brzeziny County, Łódź Voivodeship, in central Poland.
