= Jaroslav Doubrava =

Czech composer, painter, and pedagogue (1909–1960)

Jaroslav Doubrava (25 April 1909 in Chrudim – 2 October 1960 in Prague) was a Czech composer, painter, and pedagogue.

He studied at the Prague Conservatory with Otakar Jeremiáš. His works are typified by somber, yet dramatic, music in the Romantic style. His Third Symphony (1957) and ballet Don Quijote (1955) are some of his most popular works. Doubrava was heavily influenced by Bohemian and Moravian folklore, as seen in his opera Ballad on Love (1960). He was also known for his satires, especiallyKing Lávra (1951), Lazy Honza, and The Christening of St. Vladimir.
