= Dubravice, Konjic =

Dubravice Дубравице
- Village
- Location within Bosnia and Herzegovina
- Coordinates: 43°39′07″N 18°00′07″E
- Country: Bosnia and Herzegovina
- Entity: Federation of Bosnia and Herzegovina
- Canton: Herzegovina-Neretva
- Municipality: Konjic

Area
  - Total: 2.51 sq mi (6.51 km^{2})

Population (2013)
  - Total: 32
  - Density: 13/sq mi (4.9/km^{2})
- Time zone: UTC+1 (CET)
  - Summer (DST): UTC+2 (CEST)

Dubravice (Cyrillic: Дубравице) is a village in the municipality of Konjic, Bosnia and Herzegovina.

== Demographics ==
According to the 2013 census, its population was 32.

Ethnicity in 2013
Ethnicity	Number	Percentage
Bosniaks	21	65.6%
Croats	9	28.1%
Serbs	2	6.3%
Total	32	100%
