= Vidice (Domažlice District) =

- Municipality
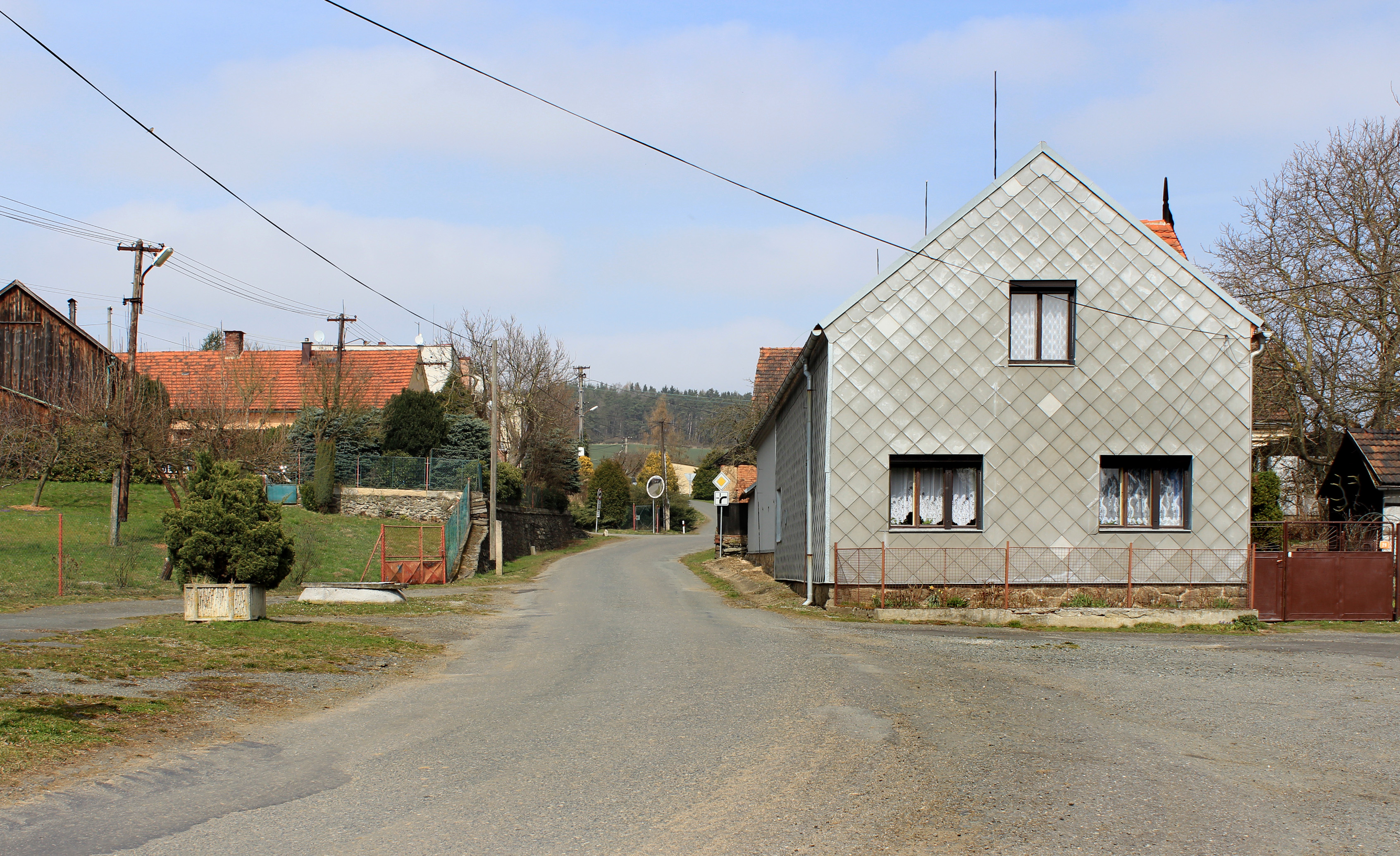
- Centre of Vidice

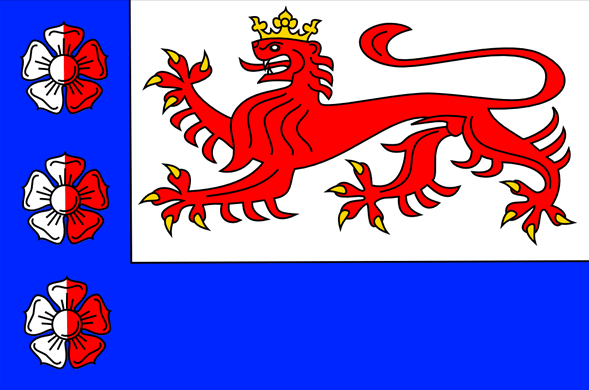
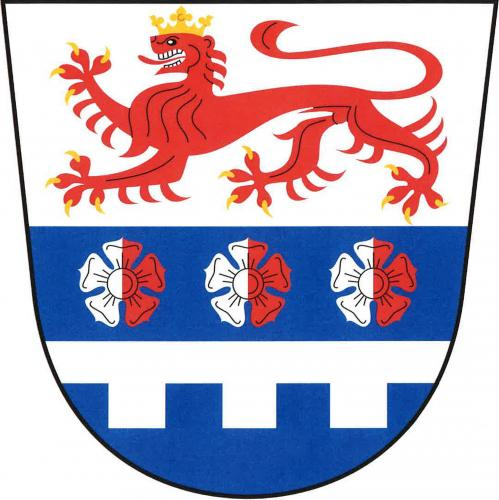
- Flag Coat of arms

- Location in the Czech Republic
- Coordinates: 49°36′50″N 12°50′8″E
- Country: Czech Republic
- Region: Plzeň
- District: Domažlice
- First mentioned: 1362

Area
  - Total: 11.95 km^{2} (4.61 sq mi)
- Elevation: 502 m (1,647 ft)

Population (2026-01-01)
  - Total: 183
  - Density: 15.3/km^{2} (39.7/sq mi)
- Time zone: UTC+1 (CET)
  - Summer (DST): UTC+2 (CEST)
- Postal code: 346 01
- Website: www.vidice.cz

Vidice is a municipality and village in Domažlice District in the Plzeň Region of the Czech Republic. It has about 200 inhabitants.

Vidice lies approximately 21 kilometres (13 mi) north of Domažlice, 42 km (26 mi) west of Plzeň, and 126 km (78 mi) south-west of Prague.

== Administrative division ==
Vidice consists of three municipal parts (in brackets population according to the 2021 census):

- Vidice (119)
- Chřebřany (9)
- Libosváry (43)

== Demographics ==
Historical population
Year	Pop.	±%
1869	515	—
1880	546	+6.0%
1890	516	−5.5%
1900	515	−0.2%
1910	558	+8.3%
1921	543	−2.7%
1930	510	−6.1%
1950	223	−56.3%
1961	225	+0.9%
1970	230	+2.2%
1980	222	−3.5%
1991	201	−9.5%
2001	182	−9.5%
2011	163	−10.4%
2021	171	+4.9%
Source: Censuses
