= Dubravica, Zavidovići =

Dubravica Дубравица
- Village
- Location within Bosnia and Herzegovina
- Coordinates: 44.4410347°N 18.1085681°E
- Country: Bosnia and Herzegovina
- Entity: Federation of Bosnia and Herzegovina
- Canton: Zenica-Doboj
- Municipality: Zavidovići

Area
  - Total: 1.26 sq mi (3.26 km^{2})

Population (2013)
  - Total: 1,237
  - Density: 983/sq mi (379/km^{2})
- Time zone: UTC+1 (CET)
  - Summer (DST): UTC+2 (CEST)

Dubravica is a village in the municipality of Zavidovići, Bosnia and Herzegovina.

== Demographics ==
According to the 2013 census, its population was 1,237.

Ethnicity in 2013
Ethnicity	Number	Percentage
Bosniaks	1,099	88.8%
Croats	99	8.0%
Serbs	5	0.4%
other/undeclared	34	2.7%
Total	1,237	100%
