= Dabrava, Blagoevgrad Province =

Dabrava Дъбрава
- Village
- Location within Bulgaria
- Coordinates: 42°3′0″N 23°7′1″E
- Country: Bulgaria
- Province: Blagoevgrad Province
- Municipality: Blagoevgrad

Government
  - Mayor: Metodi Stoyanov (NFSB)

Area
  - Total: 13.551 km^{2} (5.232 sq mi)
- Elevation: 593 m (1,946 ft)

Population (2021)
  - Total: 129
- GRAO
- Time zone: UTC+2 (EET)
  - Summer (DST): UTC+3 (EEST)
- Postal Code: 2723
- Area code: 073
- Website: http://www.dabrava.com/ (in Bulgarian)

Dabrava is a sparsely populated village in Blagoevgrad Municipality, in Blagoevgrad Province, Bulgaria. It is situated in the foothills of Rila mountain 4 kilometers east of Blagoevgrad and is composed of 14 neighborhoods. The village has regular bus connection with Blagoevgrad. People grow tobacco and grains. There are two churches in the village.

Dabrava Glacier on Graham Land, Antarctica, is named after the village.
