= Dąbrowa, Brzeziny County =

Dąbrowa
- Village
- Location within Poland
- Coordinates: 51°47′52″N 19°54′48″E
- Country: Poland
- Voivodeship: Łódź
- County: Brzeziny
- Gmina: Jeżów
- Population: 137

Dąbrowa [dɔmˈbrɔva] is a village in the administrative district of Gmina Jeżów, within Brzeziny County, Łódź Voivodeship, in central Poland.
