= Olszewo, Łódź Voivodeship =

Olszewo
- Village
- Location within Poland
- Coordinates: 51°46′36″N 19°53′30″E
- Country: Poland
- Voivodeship: Łódź
- County: Brzeziny
- Gmina: Jeżów
- Population: 70

Olszewo [ɔlˈʂɛvɔ] is a village in the administrative district of Gmina Jeżów, within Brzeziny County, Łódź Voivodeship, in central Poland.
