= Kuślin =

- Village
- Location within Poland
- Coordinates: 52°22′N 16°19′E
- Country: Poland
- Voivodeship: Greater Poland
- County: Nowy Tomyśl
- Gmina: Kuślin

Kuślin [ˈkuɕlin] is a village in Nowy Tomyśl County, Greater Poland Voivodeship, in west-central Poland. It is the seat of the gmina (administrative district) called Gmina Kuślin.
