= Śliwno, Greater Poland Voivodeship =

Śliwno
- Village
- Location within Poland
- Coordinates: 52°24′34″N 16°22′45″E
- Country: Poland
- Voivodeship: Greater Poland
- County: Nowy Tomyśl
- Gmina: Kuślin

Śliwno [ˈɕlivnɔ] is a village in the administrative district of Gmina Kuślin, within Nowy Tomyśl County, Greater Poland Voivodeship, in west-central Poland.
