= Dubravica, Vitez =

Dubravica
- Village
- Location within Bosnia and Herzegovina
- Coordinates: 44.1503298°N 17.8028254°E
- Country: Bosnia and Herzegovina
- Entity: Federation of Bosnia and Herzegovina
- Canton: Central Bosnia
- Municipality: Vitez

Area
  - Total: 1.14 sq mi (2.96 km^{2})

Population (2013)
  - Total: 1,076
  - Density: 941/sq mi (364/km^{2})
- Time zone: UTC+1 (CET)
  - Summer (DST): UTC+2 (CEST)

Dubravica is a village in the municipality of Vitez, Bosnia and Herzegovina.

== Demographics ==
According to the 2013 census, its population was 1,076.

Ethnicity in 2013
Ethnicity	Number	Percentage
Croats	703	65.3%
Bosniaks	342	31.8%
Serbs	3	0.3%
other/undeclared	28	2.6%
Total	1,076	100%
