= Kosiska, Łódź Voivodeship =

Kosiska
- Village
- Location within Poland
- Coordinates: 51°47′50″N 19°57′30″E
- Country: Poland
- Voivodeship: Łódź
- County: Brzeziny
- Gmina: Jeżów

Kosiska [kɔˈɕiska] is a village in the administrative district of Gmina Jeżów, within Brzeziny County, Łódź Voivodeship, in central Poland.
