= Marianówek, Łódź Voivodeship =

Marianówek
- Village
- Location within Poland
- Coordinates: 51°44′43″N 19°58′19″E
- Country: Poland
- Voivodeship: Łódź
- County: Brzeziny
- Gmina: Jeżów
- Population: 30

Marianówek [marjaˈnuvɛk] is a village in the administrative district of Gmina Jeżów, within Brzeziny County, Łódź Voivodeship, in central Poland.
