= Władysławowo, Łódź Voivodeship =

Władysławowo
- Village
- Location within Poland
- Coordinates: 51°46′41″N 19°55′1″E
- Country: Poland
- Voivodeship: Łódź
- County: Brzeziny
- Gmina: Jeżów

Władysławowo [vwadɨswaˈvɔvɔ] is a village in the administrative district of Gmina Jeżów, within Brzeziny County, Łódź Voivodeship, in central Poland.
