= Puclice =

- Municipality
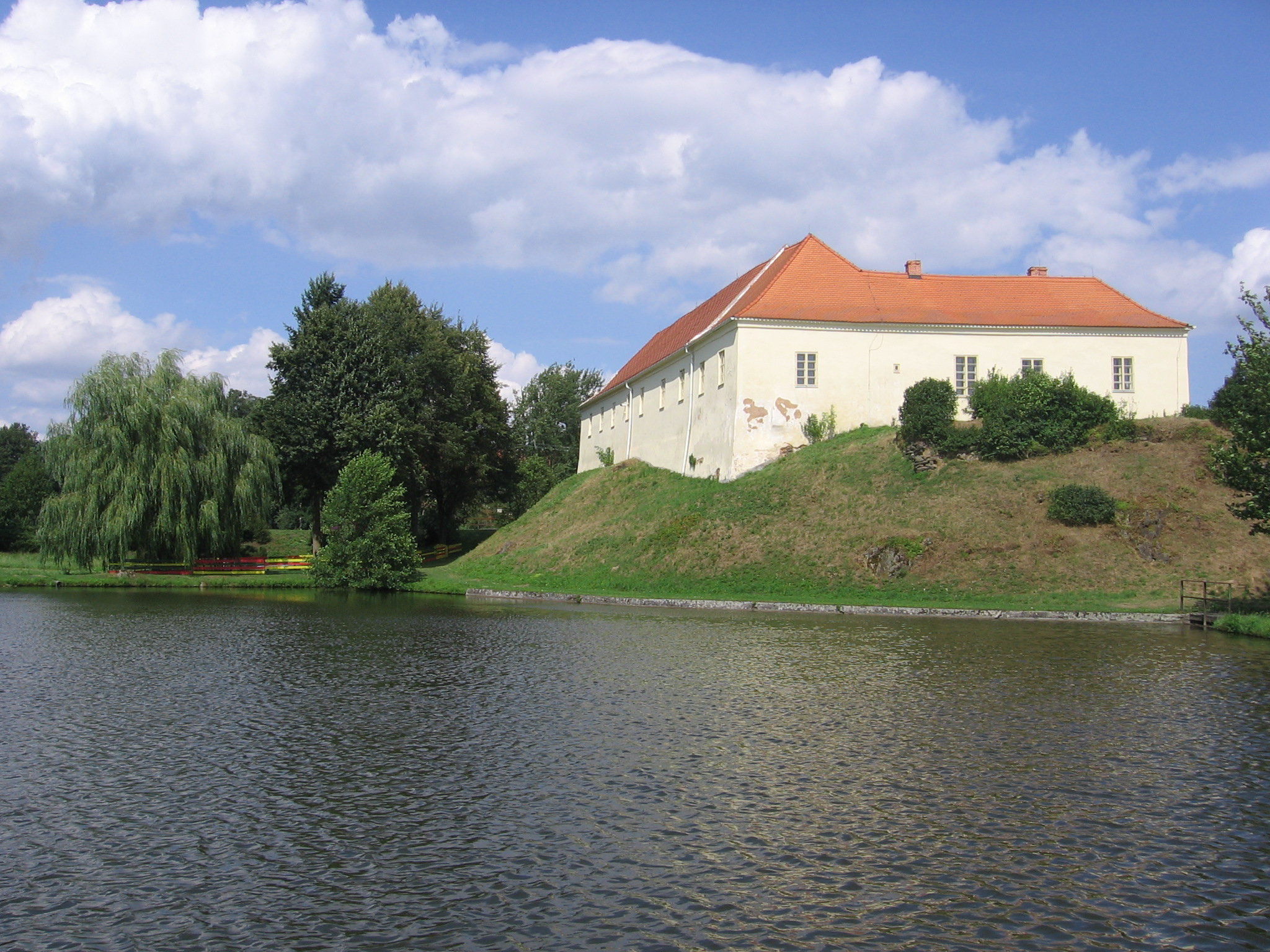
- Former fort

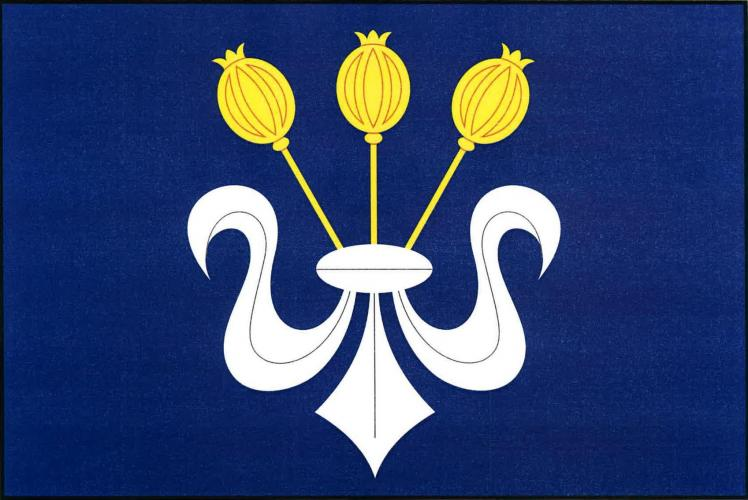
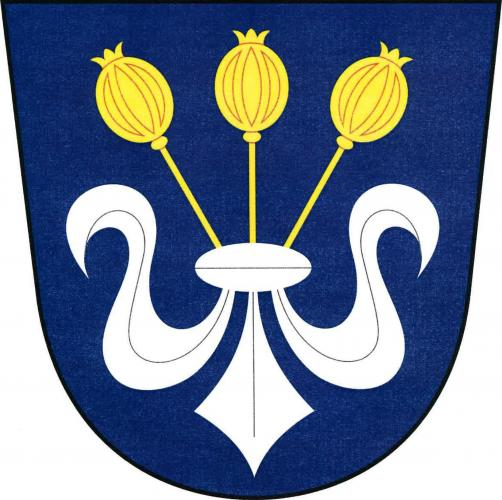
- Flag Coat of arms

- Location in the Czech Republic
- Coordinates: 49°33′13″N 13°1′10″E
- Country: Czech Republic
- Region: Plzeň
- District: Domažlice
- First mentioned: 1379

Area
  - Total: 13.85 km^{2} (5.35 sq mi)
- Elevation: 398 m (1,306 ft)

Population (2026-01-01)
  - Total: 370
  - Density: 27/km^{2} (69/sq mi)
- Time zone: UTC+1 (CET)
  - Summer (DST): UTC+2 (CEST)
- Postal code: 345 61
- Website: www.puclice.cz

Puclice is a municipality and village in Domažlice District in the Plzeň Region of the Czech Republic. It has about 400 inhabitants.

Puclice lies approximately 15 kilometres (9 mi) north-east of Domažlice, 34 km (21 mi) south-west of Plzeň, and 117 km (73 mi) south-west of Prague.

== Administrative division ==
Puclice consists of three municipal parts (in brackets population according to the 2021 census):

- Puclice (253)
- Doubrava (47)
- Malý Malahov (60)

== Demographics ==
Historical population
Year	Pop.	±%
1869	628	—
1880	668	+6.4%
1890	661	−1.0%
1900	709	+7.3%
1910	800	+12.8%
1921	729	−8.9%
1930	714	−2.1%
1950	450	−37.0%
1961	476	+5.8%
1970	431	−9.5%
1980	416	−3.5%
1991	355	−14.7%
2001	302	−14.9%
2011	334	+10.6%
2021	360	+7.8%
Source: Censuses
