= Jeżów, Brzeziny County =

Jeżów
- Town
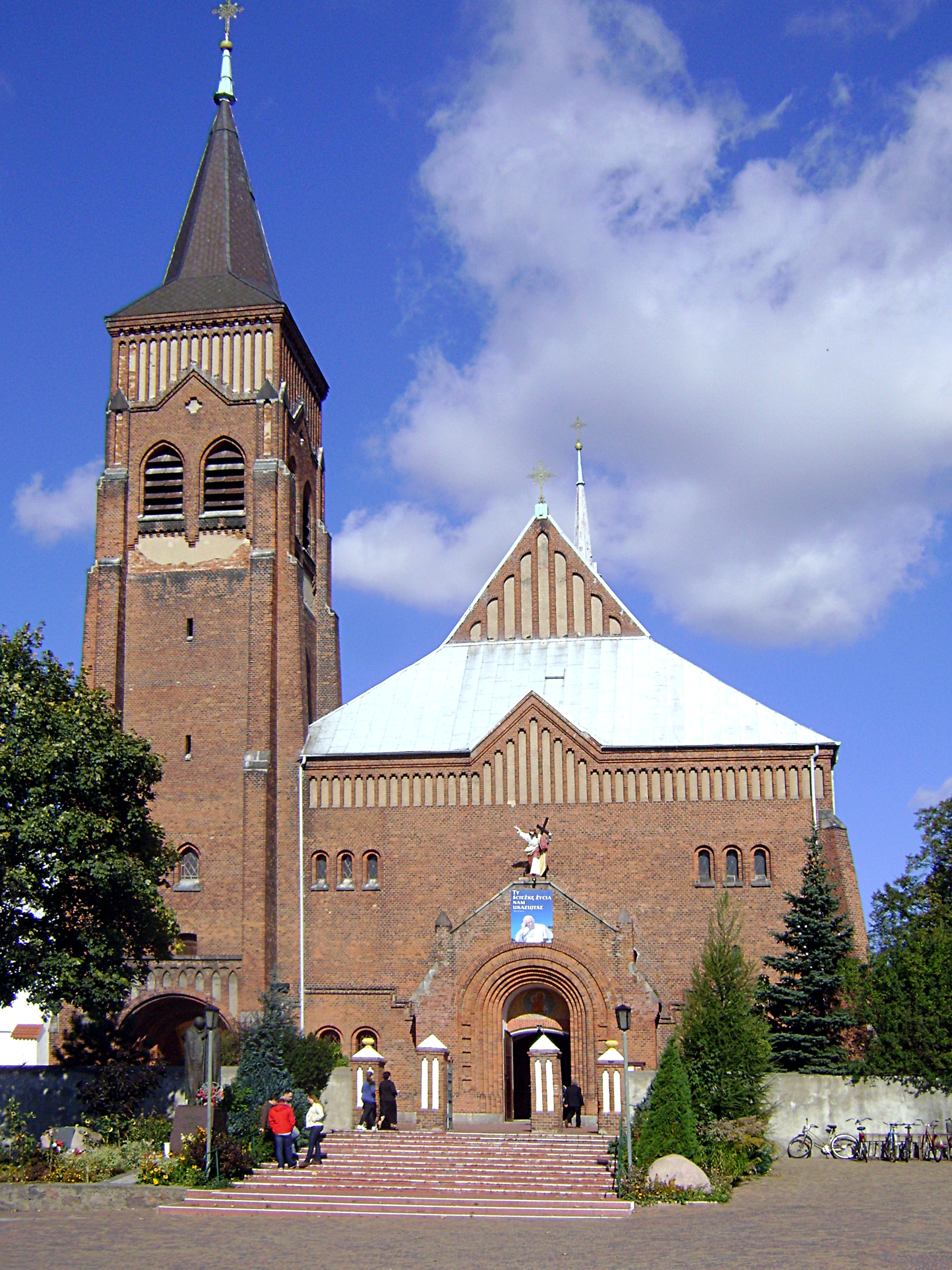
- Saint Joseph church in Jeżów

- Coat of arms

- Location within Poland
- Coordinates: 51°48′49″N 19°58′7″E
- Country: Poland
- Voivodeship: Łódź
- County: Brzeziny
- Gmina: Jeżów
- Town rights: 1334

Population
  - Total: 1,400
- Time zone: UTC+1 (CET)
  - Summer (DST): UTC+2 (CEST)
- Vehicle registration: EBR

Jeżów [ˈjɛʐuf] is a small town in Brzeziny County, Łódź Voivodeship, in central Poland. It is the seat of the gmina (administrative district) called Gmina Jeżów. It lies approximately 16 km (10 mi) east of Brzeziny and 35 km (22 mi) east of the regional capital Łódź.

== History ==
Around 100 ancient Roman denarii have been found in Jeżów in 1891.

Jeżów was granted town rights in 1334. It was a private church town of the Benedictines from Lubiń, administratively located in the Rawa County in the Rawa Voivodeship in the Greater Poland Province. Thanks to the efforts of the abbots of Lubiń, the town was granted various privileges by the Dukes of Mazovia and the Kings of Poland. In order to promote the town's development, abbot Eustachy Wołowicz established guilds for blacksmiths, wheelwrights and shoemakers. In 1778, King Stanisław August Poniatowski confirmed old fairs, and established four new fairs.

== Demographics ==
Historical population
Year	Pop.	±%
1890	2,103	—
1900	1,935	−8.0%
1910	2,673	+38.1%
