= Dúbrava, Liptovský Mikuláš District =

Village and municipality in Slovakia

Dúbrava
- Municipality
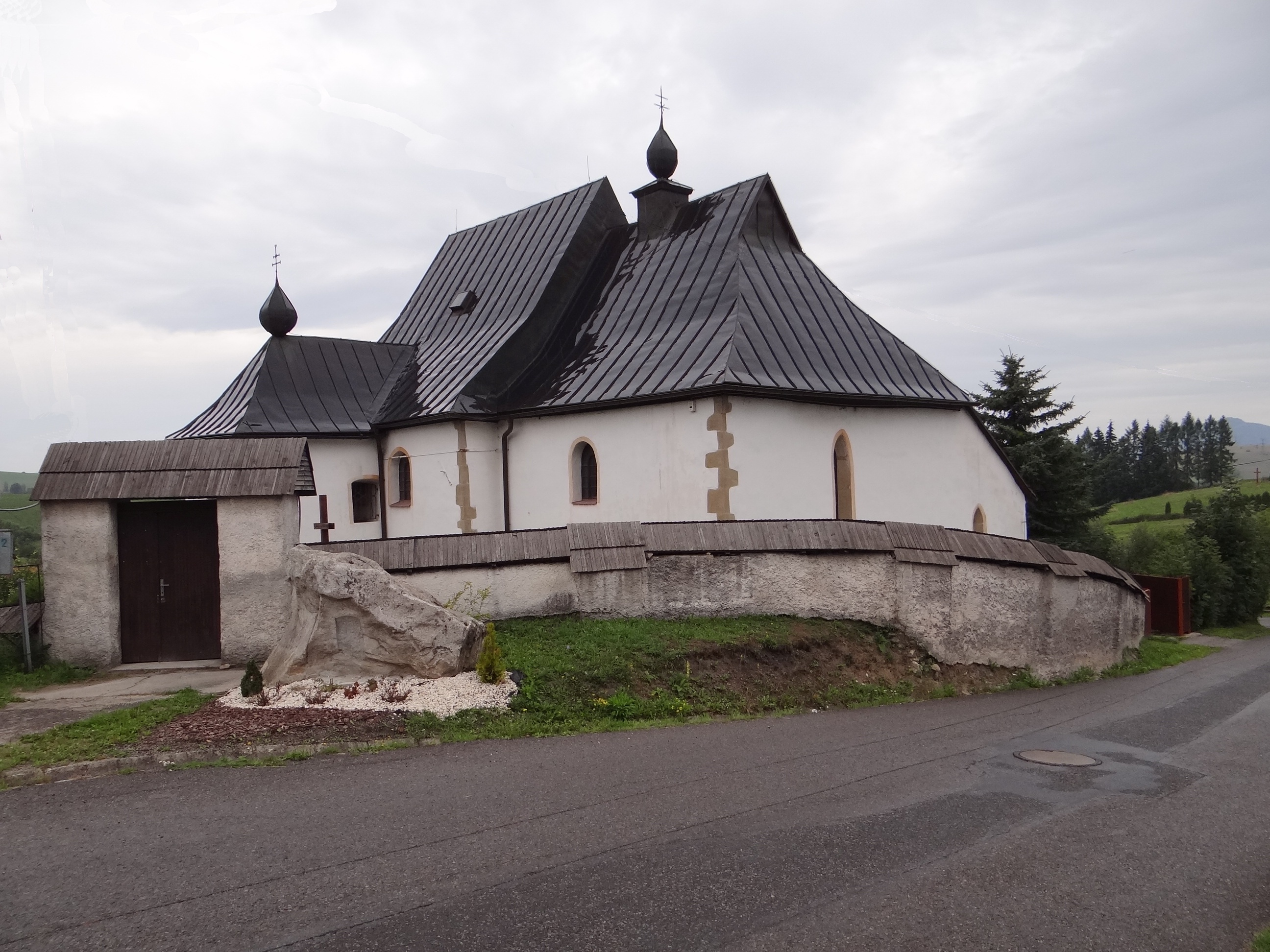

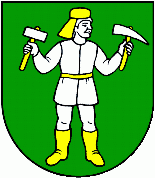
- Flag Coat of arms

- Location of Dúbrava in the Žilina Region Location of Dúbrava in Slovakia
- Coordinates: 49°02′25″N 19°29′39″E
- Country: Slovakia
- Region: Žilina Region
- District: Liptovský Mikuláš District
- First mentioned: 1372

Area
  - Total: 23.21 km^{2} (8.96 sq mi)
- Elevation: 649 m (2,129 ft)

Population (2025)
  - Total: 1,180
- Time zone: UTC+1 (CET)
  - Summer (DST): UTC+2 (CEST)
- Postal code: 321 6
- Area code: +421 44
- Vehicle registration plate (until 2022): LM
- Website: www.obecdubrava.sk

Dúbrava (Hungarian: Dubrava) is a village and municipality in Liptovský Mikuláš District in the Žilina Region of northern Slovakia.

== History ==
In historical records the village was first mentioned in 1372. Before the establishment of independent Czechoslovakia in 1918, it was part of Liptó County within the Kingdom of Hungary. From 1939 to 1945, it was part of the Slovak Republic.

== Geography ==
The municipality lies at an altitude of 649 metres (2,129 ft) and covers an area of 23.21 km^{2} (8.96 sq mi) (2025).

== Population ==
Population statistic (10 years)
Year	1995	2005	2015	2025
Count	1354	1281	1229	1180
Difference		−5.39%	−4.05%	−3.98%

Population statistic
Year	2024	2025
Count	1192	1180
Difference		−1.00%

It has a population of 1180 people (31 December 2025).

=== Ethnicity ===
Census 2021 (1+ %)
Ethnicity	Number	Fraction
Slovak	1197	97.47%
Not found out	26	2.11%
Total	1228	

In year 2021 was 1228 people by ethnicity 1197 as Slovak, 26 as Not found out, 8 as Czech, 3 as Hungarian, 1 as Irish, 1 as Ukrainian and 1 as Serbian.

Note on population: The difference values of population numbers in the table "Population statistic" and in the sections "Ethnicity" & "Religion" is caused by the use of various statistical methods.

=== Religion ===
Census 2021 (1+ %)
Religion	Number	Fraction
Roman Catholic Church	664	54.07%
Evangelical Church	288	23.45%
None	230	18.73%
Not found out	26	2.12%
Total	1228	

In year 2021 was 1228 people by religion 664 from Roman Catholic Church, 288 from Evangelical Church, 230 from None, 26 from Not found out, 8 from Greek Catholic Church, 4 from Jehovah's Witnesses, 2 from Paganism and natural spirituality, 2 from Other and not ascertained christian church, 1 from Christian Congregations in Slovakia, 1 from Other, 1 from Hinduism and 1 from Ad hoc movements.

== Genealogical resources ==
The records for genealogical research are available at the state archive "Statny Archiv in Bratislava, Banska Bystrica, Bytca, Kosice, Levoca, Nitra, Presov, Slovakia"

- Roman Catholic church records (births/marriages/deaths): 1725-1896 (parish B)
- Lutheran church records (births/marriages/deaths): 1783-1895 (parish B)

== See also ==
- List of municipalities and towns in Slovakia
