= Dąbrowa, Gmina Kuślin =

Dąbrowa
- Village
- Location within Poland
- Coordinates: 52°19′59″N 16°16′49″E
- Country: Poland
- Voivodeship: Greater Poland
- County: Nowy Tomyśl
- Gmina: Kuślin

Dąbrowa [dɔmˈbrɔva] is a village in the administrative district of Gmina Kuślin, within Nowy Tomyśl County, Greater Poland Voivodeship, in west-central Poland.
