= Dubrava, Ivanjica =

Dubrava Дубрава
- Town
- Location within Serbia
- Coordinates: 43°35′58″N 20°07′48″E
- Country: Serbia
- District: Moravica District
- Municipality: Ivanjica

Area
  - Total: 28.13 km^{2} (10.86 sq mi)

Population (2011)
  - Total: 1,695
  - Density: 60.26/km^{2} (156.1/sq mi)
- Time zone: UTC+1 (CET)
  - Summer (DST): UTC+2 (CEST)

Dubrava is a town in the municipality of Ivanjica, Serbia. According to the 2011 census, the town has a population of 1,695 inhabitants.
