= Mikulin, Łódź Voivodeship =

Mikulin
- Village
- Location within Poland
- Coordinates: 51°49′47″N 19°58′40″E
- Country: Poland
- Voivodeship: Łódź
- County: Brzeziny
- Gmina: Jeżów

Mikulin [miˈkulin] is a village in the administrative district of Gmina Jeżów, within Brzeziny County, Łódź Voivodeship, in central Poland.
