= Dąbrowa, Gmina Mircze =

Dąbrowa
- Village
- Location within Poland
- Coordinates: 50°36′26″N 23°52′37″E
- Country: Poland
- Voivodeship: Lublin
- County: Hrubieszów
- Gmina: Mircze

Dąbrowa [dɔmˈbrɔva] is a village in the administrative district of Gmina Mircze, within Hrubieszów County, Lublin Voivodeship, in eastern Poland, close to the border with Ukraine. It is currently both the smallest and least populous town\settlement in Poland.
