= Dubrave, Jajce =

Dubrave
- Village
- Location within Bosnia and Herzegovina
- Coordinates: 44°16′39″N 17°24′14″E
- Country: Bosnia and Herzegovina
- Entity: Federation of Bosnia and Herzegovina
- Canton: Central Bosnia
- Municipality: Jajce

Area
  - Total: 2.29 sq mi (5.92 km^{2})

Population (2013)
  - Total: 2
  - Density: 0.87/sq mi (0.34/km^{2})
- Time zone: UTC+1 (CET)
  - Summer (DST): UTC+2 (CEST)

Dubrave is a village in the municipality of Jajce, Bosnia and Herzegovina.

== Demographics ==
According to the 2013 census, its population was just 2.

Ethnicity in 2013
Ethnicity	Number	Percentage
Croats	1	50.0%
other/undeclared	1	50.0%
Total	2	100%
