= Vlatka Oršanić =

Croatian opera singer (soprano) and vocal pedagogue

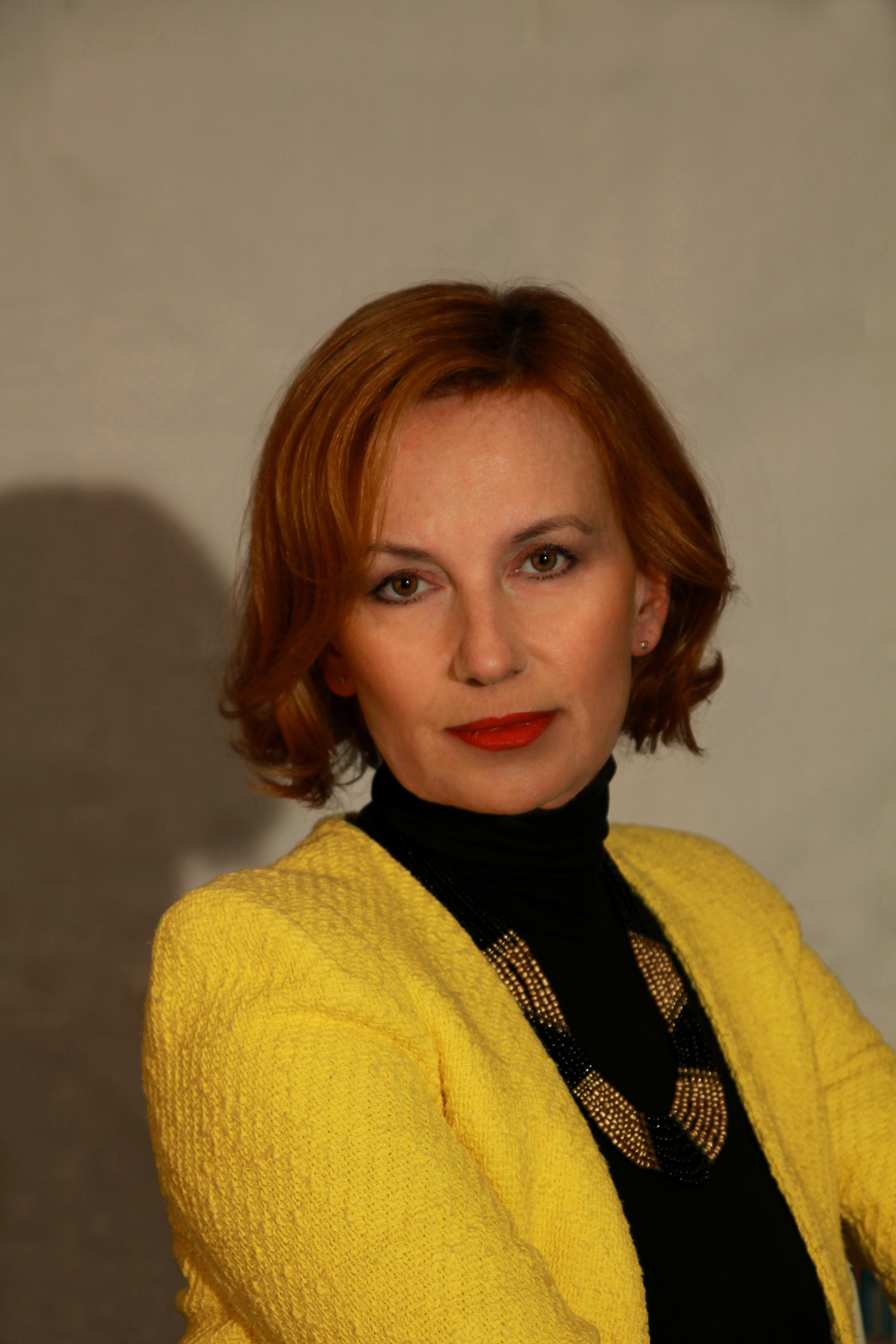
- Born: 29 January 1958; Zabok, Croatia, Yugoslavia
- Occupations: Opera singer (soprano); Vocal pedagogue

Vlatka Oršanić (born 1958) is a Croatian opera singer (soprano) and vocal pedagogue.

== Life and career ==
Oršanić was born in Zabok, Croatia. She spent her childhood in Varaždin where she began her music education at the School of Music. She studied piano from the age of 7 and singing from the age of 14 under Ankica Opolski. At the age of 16 she entered the Academy of Music in Ljubljana, studying voice under Ondina Otta-Klasinc. She graduated in the spring of 1979 and made her debut as Sophie in Werther at Ljubljana Slovene National Theatre Opera and Ballet. She was subsequently engaged as a soloist there and also began making guest appearances in other opera houses in what was then Yugoslavia. In that time she was celebrated as an extraordinary Lucia and Gilda. From 1985 to 1990 she lived in Vienna, where she pursued further study in solo singing techniques with Olivera Miljaković.

The 1990s saw the beginning of Oršanić's international career. She sang at the Salzburg State Theatre where she appeared as Despina in Così fan tutte, Bastienne in Bastien und Bastienne, Euridice in Orfeo ed Euridice and Tamiri in Il re pastore. She went on to sing as a guest artist at various opera houses in Europe and from 1992 to 1995 was the soloist at the Staatstheater Darmstadt. Her most successful roles were Jenufa, Lady Macbeth and Katerina Ismailova. She sang at Semperoper Dresden, Komische Oper Berlin, Oper Leipzig, Aalto-Musiktheater Essen, Teatro Comunale Florence and elsewhere. She performed at Salzburger Festspiele, Wiener Festwochen, Edinburgh Festival, Maggio Musicale Fiorentino, Festival d'automne Paris and at some of the most important european concert halls including Musikverein and Konzerthaus in Vienna, Konzerthaus and Philharmonie in Berlin, Alte Oper in Frankfurt, Philharmonie in Köln, Théâtre du Châtelet in Paris and Auditorio Municipal in Madrid. Collaboration with conductors: Semyon Bychkov, Michael Gielen, Vladimir Jurowski, Kirill Petrenko, Daniel Harding and others; directors: Joachim Herz, Harry Kupfer, Christine Mielitz, Liliana Cavani and others. Among her partners were Elina Garanča, Anja Harteros, Piotr Beczała and Peter Schreier. In 2003 she returned Slovene National Theatre Opera in Ljubljana as the company's principal soprano. That same year she began her career as a vocal pedagogue. She is a professor at the Academy of Music in Zagreb and has served as the head of its Voice Department from 2007. Oršanić is also the co-founder and director of the Zinka Milanov International Competition for young opera singers.

== Awards ==
- 1976 – The Prešeren Student Award
- 1979 – 1st Prize at Mario Del Monaco International Vocal Competition for Opera Singers in Udine, Italy.
- 1980 – 2nd Prize at Belcanto, international television competition in Oostende, Belgium.
- 2004 – Marijana Radev Award (Croatia) for the best woman opera role in the season (Katerina Izmailova in the opera Lady Macbeth of the Mtsensk District).
- 2007 – Milka Trnina Award (Croatia) for extraordinary artistic achievements.
- 2010 – Sergije Rainis Plaquette (Croatia) for extraordinary achievements in the field of vocal art and pedagogy.
- 2011 – Award of the Croatian Association of Music and Dance Pedagogues for extraordinary achievements in the field of music pedagogy.
- 2012 – The Samo Smerkolj Award (Slovenia) for the artistic achievements of the Slovene opera singers, especially in the field of chamber opera.
- 2012 – The Betetto Award (Slovenia) for the artistic achievements and overall contribution to the Slovenian music culture.

== Discography ==
- Alexander von Zemlinsky: Lyrische Symphonie / Alban Berg: Altenberg Lieder. SWF Symphony Orchestra, conductor Michael Gielen. Arte Nova Classics, 1995
- Ludwig van Beethoven: Symphony No. 9. SWF Symphony Orchestra, conductor Michael Gielen. EMI Records, 1995
- Bernd Alois Zimmermann: Requiem für einen jungen Dichter. SWF Symphony Orchestra, conductor Michael Gielen. Sony Classical, 1995
- G. F. Handel: Nine German Arias. Drago Arko, violin; Ciril Škerjanc, cello; Vlasta Doležal-Rus, harpsichord; Založba kaset in plošč, Ljubljana 2000

== Media ==
- The Portrait of Vlatka Oršanić. Croatian television production, 2000. Directed by Branko Ivanda
- Television broadcast of Vlatka Oršanić. Author: Darja Korez Korenčan. Production: Television Slovenia, 2004
