= Špičkovina =

Coordinates: 46°01′34″N 15°57′32″E

- Village
- Interactive map of Špičkovina
- Country: Croatia
- County: Krapina-Zagorje County

Area
  - Total: 1.6 sq mi (4.1 km^{2})

Population (2021)
  - Total: 741
  - Density: 470/sq mi (180/km^{2})
- Time zone: UTC+1 (CET)
  - Summer (DST): UTC+2 (CEST)

Špičkovina is a village in Croatia. It is connected by the D24 highway and R201 railway.
