= Dubrava Zabočka =

Coordinates: 46°01′19″N 15°56′38″E

- Village
- Interactive map of Dubrava Zabočka
- Country: Croatia
- County: Krapina-Zagorje County

Area
  - Total: 1.1 sq mi (2.8 km^{2})

Population (2021)
  - Total: 574
  - Density: 530/sq mi (200/km^{2})
- Time zone: UTC+1 (CET)
  - Summer (DST): UTC+2 (CEST)

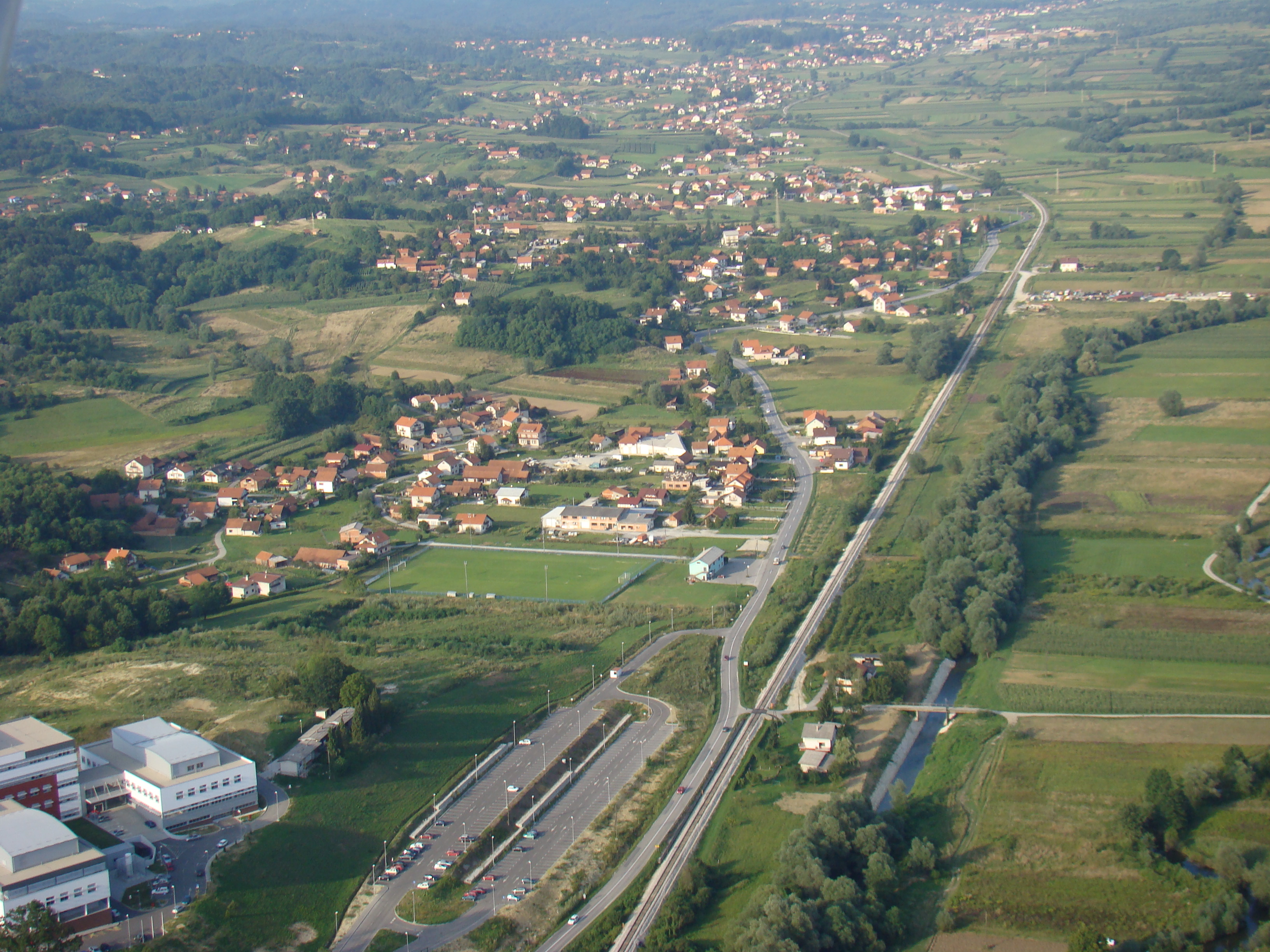

Dubrava Zabočka is a village in Croatia. It is connected by the D24 highway and R201 railway.
