= Vidice (Kutná Hora District) =

- Municipality
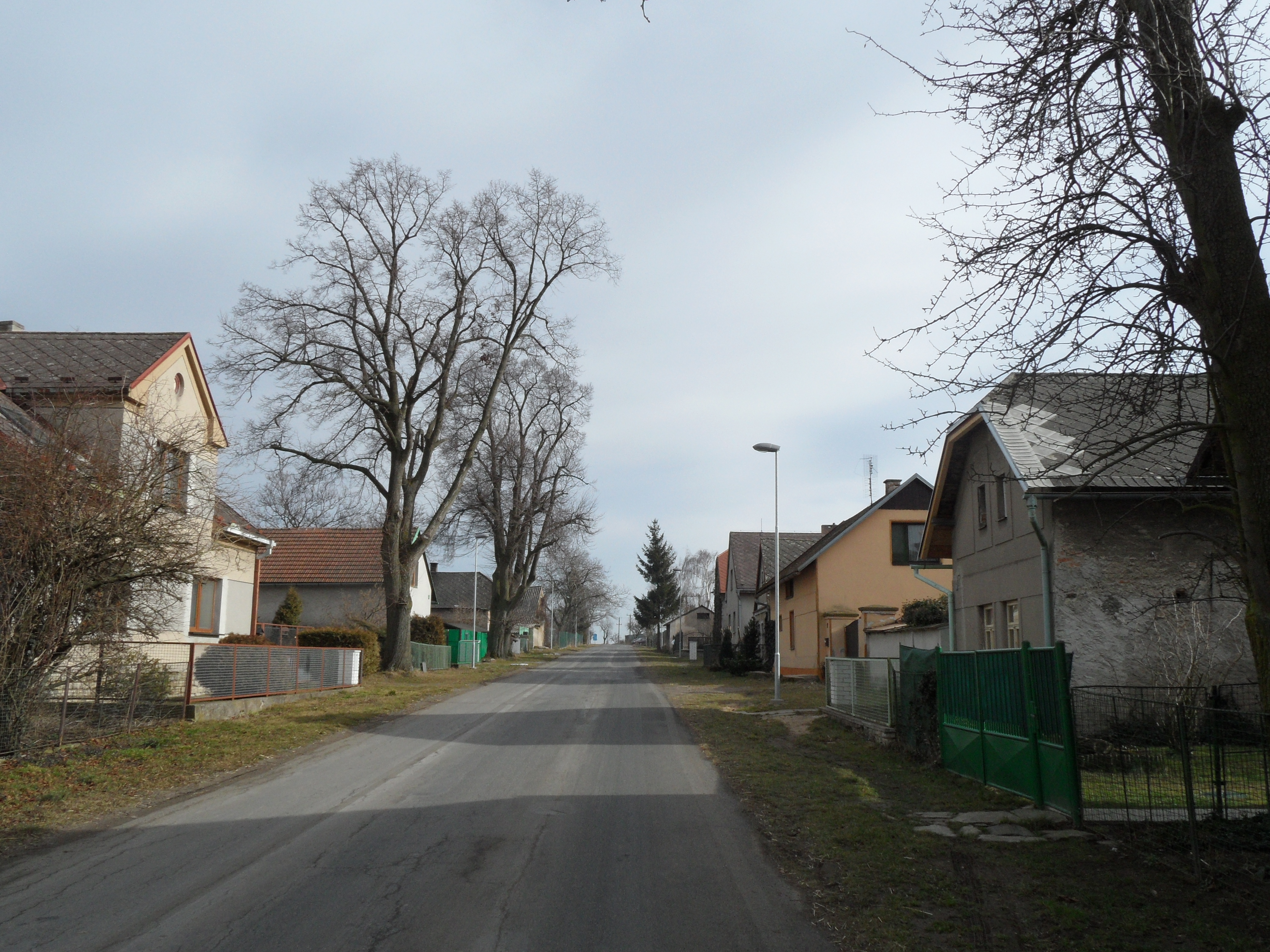
- Karlov t. Doubrava, a part of Vidice

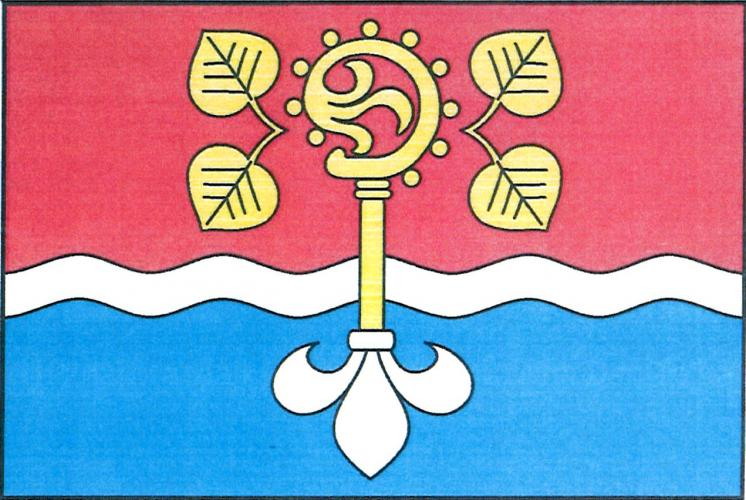
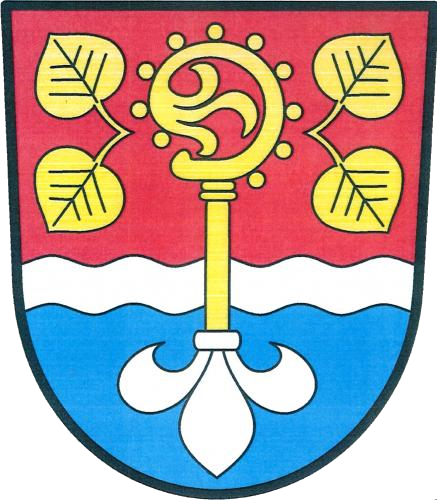
- Flag Coat of arms

- Location in the Czech Republic
- Coordinates: 49°55′0″N 15°9′56″E
- Country: Czech Republic
- Region: Central Bohemian
- District: Kutná Hora
- First mentioned: 1303

Area
  - Total: 11.79 km^{2} (4.55 sq mi)
- Elevation: 425 m (1,394 ft)

Population (2026-01-01)
  - Total: 278
  - Density: 23.6/km^{2} (61.1/sq mi)
- Time zone: UTC+1 (CET)
  - Summer (DST): UTC+2 (CEST)
- Postal code: 284 01
- Website: www.obecvidice.cz

Vidice is a municipality and village in Kutná Hora District in the Central Bohemian Region of the Czech Republic. It has about 300 inhabitants.

== Administrative division ==
Vidice consists of five municipal parts (in brackets population according to the 2021 census):

- Vidice (84)
- Karlov t. Doubrava (34)
- Nová Lhota (42)
- Roztěž (56)
- Tuchotice (52)

== Demographics ==
Historical population
| Year | Pop. | ±% |
|---|---|---|
| 1869 | 926 | — |
| 1880 | 902 | −2.6% |
| 1890 | 867 | −3.9% |
| 1900 | 844 | −2.7% |
| 1910 | 798 | −5.5% |
| 1921 | 806 | +1.0% |
| 1930 | 748 | −7.2% |
| 1950 | 546 | −27.0% |
| 1961 | 477 | −12.6% |
| 1970 | 367 | −23.1% |
| 1980 | 313 | −14.7% |
| 1991 | 255 | −18.5% |
| 2001 | 214 | −16.1% |
| 2011 | 234 | +9.3% |
| 2021 | 268 | +14.5% |
Source: Censuses
