= Malczewski =

Malczewski (feminine: Malczewska, plural: Malczewscy) is a Polish locational surname, which originally meant a person from Malczew or Malczewo in Poland. Variants of the name include Malczewscy, Malchevski, Malchevsky. The name may refer to:

- Antoni Malczewski (1793–1826), Polish poet
- Franciszek Skarbek-Malczewski (1754–1819), Polish archbishops
- Jacek Malczewski (1854–1929), Polish painter
- Jakub Malczewski (born 1974), Polish alpine skier
- Rafał Malczewski (1892–1965), Polish painter, writer and mountaineer
- Rafał Skarbek-Malczewski (born 1982), Polish snowboarder
- Alexey Sergeevich Malchevsky (1915–1985), Soviet ornithologist, dean of biology at the Leningrad State University

== See also ==
- Malchevskaya, Nyuksensky District, Vologda Oblast, Russia
- Malchevskaya, Tarnogsky District, Vologda Oblast, Russia
