= Michałów =

Michałów means a place owned by Michał (Michael) and may refer to more than 30 places in Poland, including the following:

- Michałów, Polkowice County in Lower Silesian Voivodeship (south-west Poland)
- Michałów, Gmina Środa Śląska in Lower Silesian Voivodeship (south-west Poland)
- Michałów, Gmina Brzeziny in Łódź Voivodeship (central Poland)
- Michałów, Gmina Dmosin in Łódź Voivodeship (central Poland)
- Michałów, Kutno County in Łódź Voivodeship (central Poland)
- Michałów, Piotrków County in Łódź Voivodeship (central Poland)
- Michałów, Radomsko County in Łódź Voivodeship (central Poland)
- Michałów, Gmina Rokiciny, Tomaszów County in Łódź Voivodeship (central Poland)
- Michałów, Zduńska Wola County in Łódź Voivodeship (central Poland)
- Michałów, Zgierz County in Łódź Voivodeship (central Poland)
- Michałów, Lublin Voivodeship (east Poland)
- Michałów, Opatów County in Świętokrzyskie Voivodeship (south-central Poland)
- Michałów, Ostrowiec County in Świętokrzyskie Voivodeship (south-central Poland)
- Michałów, Pińczów County in Świętokrzyskie Voivodeship (south-central Poland)
- Michałów, Skarżysko County in Świętokrzyskie Voivodeship (south-central Poland)
- Michałów, Kozienice County in Masovian Voivodeship (east-central Poland)
- Michałów, Lipsko County in Masovian Voivodeship (east-central Poland)
- Michałów, Łosice County in Masovian Voivodeship (east-central Poland)
- Michałów, Mińsk County in Masovian Voivodeship (east-central Poland)
- Michałów, Gmina Leoncin, Nowy Dwór County in Masovian Voivodeship (east-central Poland)
- Michałów, Radom County in Masovian Voivodeship (east-central Poland)
- Michałów, Wołomin County in Masovian Voivodeship (east-central Poland)
- Michałów, Żyrardów County in Masovian Voivodeship (east-central Poland)
- Michałów, Kalisz County in Greater Poland Voivodeship (west-central Poland)
- Michałów, Ostrzeszów County in Greater Poland Voivodeship (west-central Poland)
- Michałów, Gmina Nowe Miasto nad Wartą in Greater Poland Voivodeship (west-central Poland)
- Michałów, Gmina Kłomnice in Silesian Voivodeship (south Poland)
- Michałów, Gmina Koniecpol in Silesian Voivodeship (south Poland)
- Michałów, Gmina Poczesna in Silesian Voivodeship (south Poland)
- Michałów, Opole Voivodeship (south-west Poland)
- Gmina Michałów

Michalów refers to:

- Michalów, Gmina Rachanie, Tomaszów County, Lublin Voivodeship
- Michalów, Zamość County, Lublin Voivodeship

== See also ==
- Michałowo (disambiguation)
