= Borki, Brzeziny County =

Borki
- Village
- Location within Poland
- Coordinates: 51°56′16″N 19°46′20″E
- Country: Poland
- Voivodeship: Łódź
- County: Brzeziny
- Gmina: Dmosin

Borki [ˈbɔrki] is a village in the administrative district of Gmina Dmosin, within Brzeziny County, Łódź Voivodeship, in central Poland.
