= Witkowice =

Witkowice may refer to:

- Witkowice, Lesser Poland Voivodeship (south Poland)
- Witkowice, part of the Prądnik Biały district of Kraków
- Witkowice, Łódź Voivodeship (central Poland)
- Witkowice, Subcarpathian Voivodeship (south-east Poland)
- Witkowice, Masovian Voivodeship (east-central Poland)
- Witkowice, Chodzież County in Greater Poland Voivodeship (west-central Poland)
- Witkowice, Konin County in Greater Poland Voivodeship (west-central Poland)
- Witkowice, Szamotuły County in Greater Poland Voivodeship (west-central Poland)
- Witkowice, Silesian Voivodeship (south Poland)
