= Kuźmy, Łódź Voivodeship =

Kuźmy
- Village
- Location within Poland
- Coordinates: 51°56′8″N 19°49′56″E
- Country: Poland
- Voivodeship: Łódź
- County: Brzeziny
- Gmina: Dmosin

Kuźmy [ˈkuʑmɨ] is a village in the administrative district of Gmina Dmosin, within Brzeziny County, Łódź Voivodeship, in central Poland.
