= Stare Koluszki =

- Village
- Location within Poland
- Coordinates: 51°45′56″N 19°47′7″E
- Country: Poland
- Voivodeship: Łódź
- County: Brzeziny
- Gmina: Gmina Brzeziny
- Population: 180

Stare Koluszki [ˈstarɛ kɔˈluʂki] is a village in the administrative district of Gmina Brzeziny, within Brzeziny County, Łódź Voivodeship, in central Poland.
