= Mroga Dolna =

- Village
- Location within Poland
- Coordinates: 51°49′49″N 19°48′57″E
- Country: Poland
- Voivodeship: Łódź
- County: Brzeziny
- Gmina: Rogów

Mroga Dolna [ˈmrɔɡa ˈdɔlna] is a village in the administrative district of Gmina Rogów, within Brzeziny County, Łódź Voivodeship, in central Poland.
