= Pieńki Henrykowskie =

- Village
- Location within Poland
- Coordinates: 51°50′13″N 19°46′32″E
- Country: Poland
- Voivodeship: Łódź
- County: Brzeziny
- Gmina: Gmina Brzeziny
- Population: 50

Pieńki Henrykowskie [ˈpjɛɲki xɛnrɨˈkɔfskʲɛ] is a village in the administrative district of Gmina Brzeziny, within Brzeziny County, Łódź Voivodeship, in central Poland.
