= Adamów, Brzeziny County =

Adamów
- Village
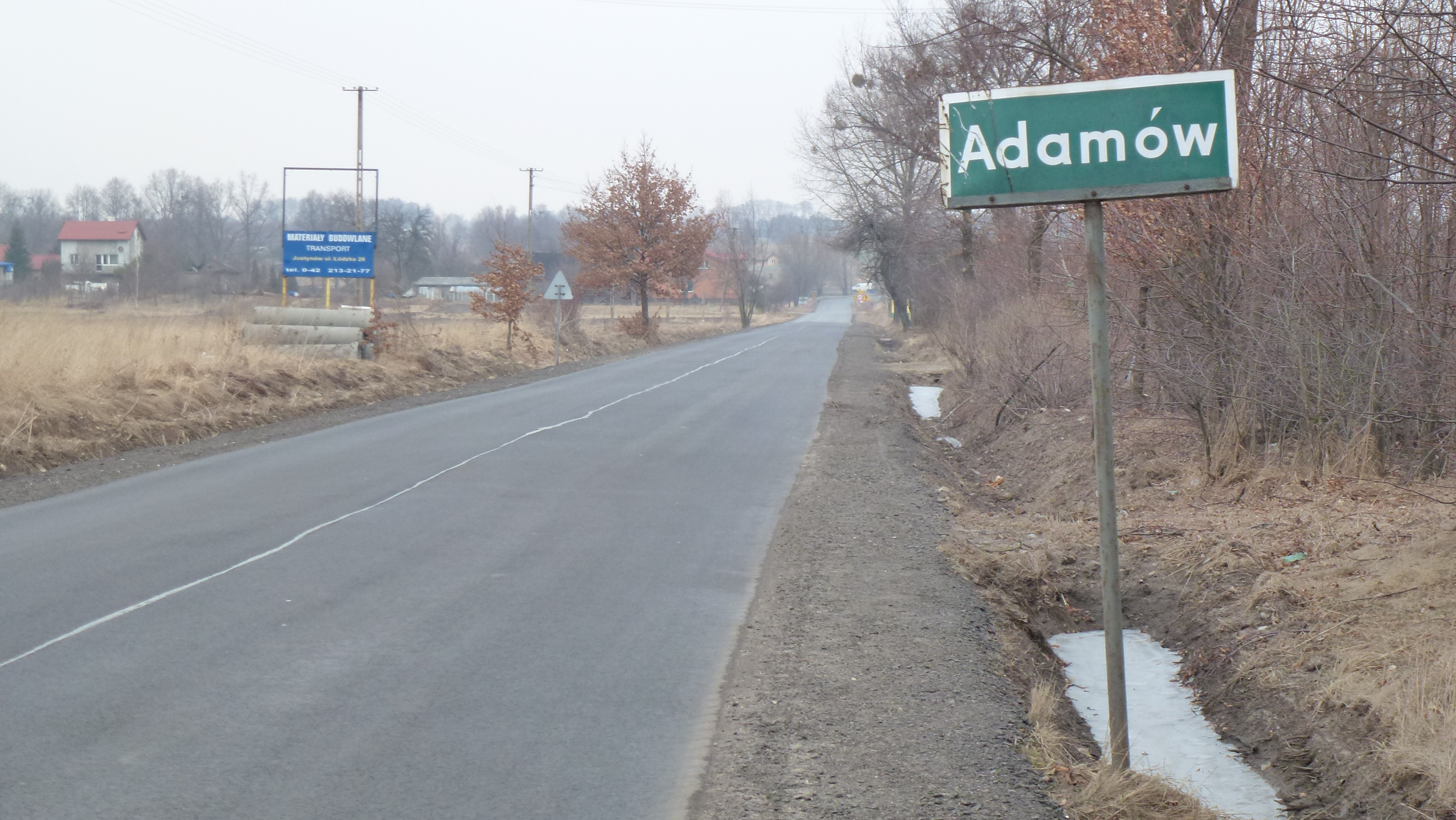

- Location within Poland
- Coordinates: 51°46′19″N 19°41′18″E
- Country: Poland
- Voivodeship: Łódź
- County: Brzeziny
- Gmina: Gmina Brzeziny

Adamów [aˈdamuf] is a village in the administrative district of Gmina Brzeziny, within Brzeziny County, Łódź Voivodeship, in central Poland.
