= Zalesie, Brzeziny County =

Zalesie
- Village
- Location within Poland
- Coordinates: 51°46′30″N 19°46′53″E
- Country: Poland
- Voivodeship: Łódź
- County: Brzeziny
- Gmina: Gmina Brzeziny

Zalesie [zaˈlɛɕɛ] is a village in the administrative district of Gmina Brzeziny, within Brzeziny County, Łódź Voivodeship, in central Poland.
