= Kędziorki =

- Village
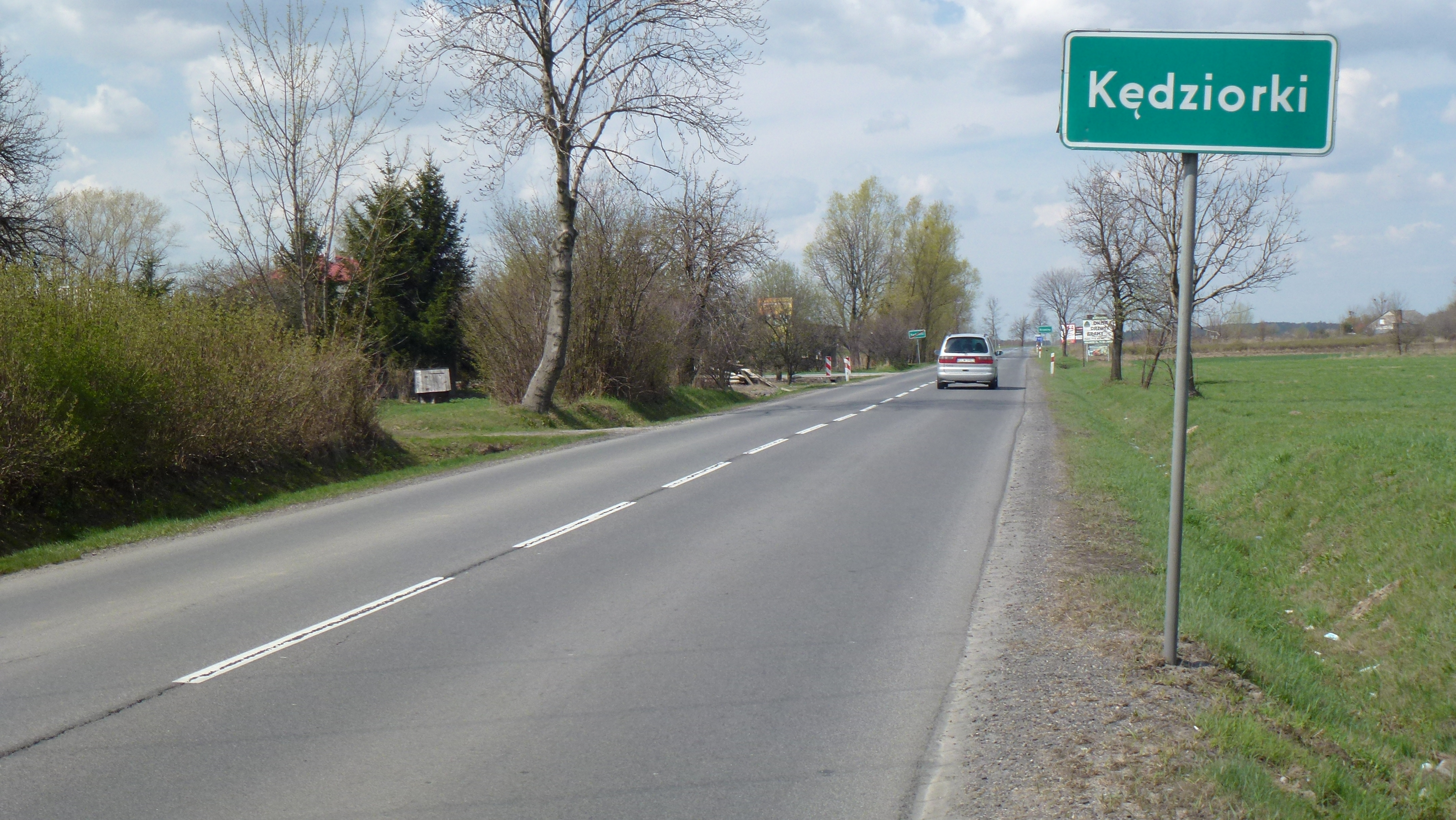

- Location within Poland
- Coordinates: 51°47′7″N 19°46′51″E
- Country: Poland
- Voivodeship: Łódź
- County: Brzeziny
- Gmina: Gmina Brzeziny

Kędziorki [kɛnˈd͡ʑɔrki] is a Polish village in the administrative district of Gmina Brzeziny, within Brzeziny County, Łódź Voivodeship, in central Poland.
