= Strzemboszowice =

- Village
- Location within Poland
- Coordinates: 51°48′00″N 19°49′04″E
- Country: Poland
- Voivodeship: Łódź
- County: Brzeziny
- Gmina: Gmina Brzeziny

Strzemboszowice [stʂɛmbɔʂɔˈvit͡sɛ] is a village in the administrative district of Gmina Brzeziny, within Brzeziny County, Łódź Voivodeship, in central Poland.
