= Henryków, Brzeziny County =

Henryków
- Village
- Location within Poland
- Coordinates: 51°49′54″N 19°47′39″E
- Country: Poland
- Voivodeship: Łódź
- County: Brzeziny
- Gmina: Gmina Brzeziny
- Population: 50

Henryków [xɛnˈrɨkuf] is a village in the administrative district of Gmina Brzeziny, within Brzeziny County, Łódź Voivodeship, in central Poland.
