= Bielanki =

- Village
- Location within Poland
- Coordinates: 51°51′N 19°47′E
- Country: Poland
- Voivodeship: Łódź
- County: Brzeziny
- Gmina: Gmina Brzeziny

Bielanki [bjɛˈlaŋki] is a village in the administrative district of Gmina Brzeziny, within Brzeziny County, Łódź Voivodeship, in central Poland.
