= Przyłęk Duży =

- Village
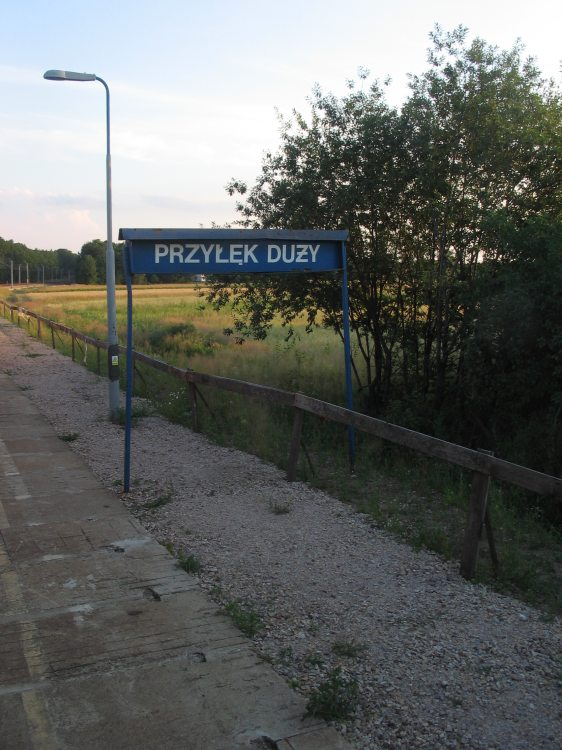

- Location within Poland
- Coordinates: 51°51′N 19°55′E
- Country: Poland
- Voivodeship: Łódź
- County: Brzeziny
- Gmina: Rogów

Przyłęk Duży [ˈpʂɨwɛŋk ˈduʐɨ] is a village in the administrative district of Gmina Rogów, within Brzeziny County, Łódź Voivodeship, in central Poland.
