= Dąbrówka Duża, Łódź Voivodeship =

Dąbrówka Duża
- Village
- Location within Poland
- Coordinates: 51°50′52″N 19°43′52″E
- Country: Poland
- Voivodeship: Łódź
- County: Brzeziny
- Gmina: Gmina Brzeziny
- Population: 340

Dąbrówka Duża [dɔmˈbrufka ˈduʐa] is a village in the administrative district of Gmina Brzeziny, within Brzeziny County, Łódź Voivodeship, in central Poland.
