= Jaroszki =

Jaroszki may refer to the following places in Poland:

- Jaroszki, Łódź Voivodeship (central Poland)
- Jaroszki, Masovian Voivodeship (east-central Poland)
