= Mroga Górna =

- Village
- Location within Poland
- Coordinates: 51°49′52″N 19°50′6″E
- Country: Poland
- Voivodeship: Łódź
- County: Brzeziny
- Gmina: Rogów

Mroga Górna [ˈmrɔɡa ˈɡurna] is a village in the administrative district of Gmina Rogów, within Brzeziny County, Łódź Voivodeship, in central Poland.
