= Janów, Brzeziny County =

Janów
- Village
- Location within Poland
- Coordinates: 51°54′10″N 19°47′16″E
- Country: Poland
- Voivodeship: Łódź
- County: Brzeziny
- Gmina: Dmosin
- Population: 60

Janów [ˈjanuf] is a village in the administrative district of Gmina Dmosin, within Brzeziny County, Łódź Voivodeship, in central Poland.
