= Tadzin, Brzeziny County =

Tadzin
- Village
- Location within Poland
- Coordinates: 51°50′21″N 19°44′22″E
- Country: Poland
- Voivodeship: Łódź
- County: Brzeziny
- Gmina: Gmina Brzeziny

Tadzin [ˈtad͡ʑin] is a village in the administrative district of Gmina Brzeziny, within Brzeziny County, Łódź Voivodeship, in central Poland.
