= Rochna =

- Village
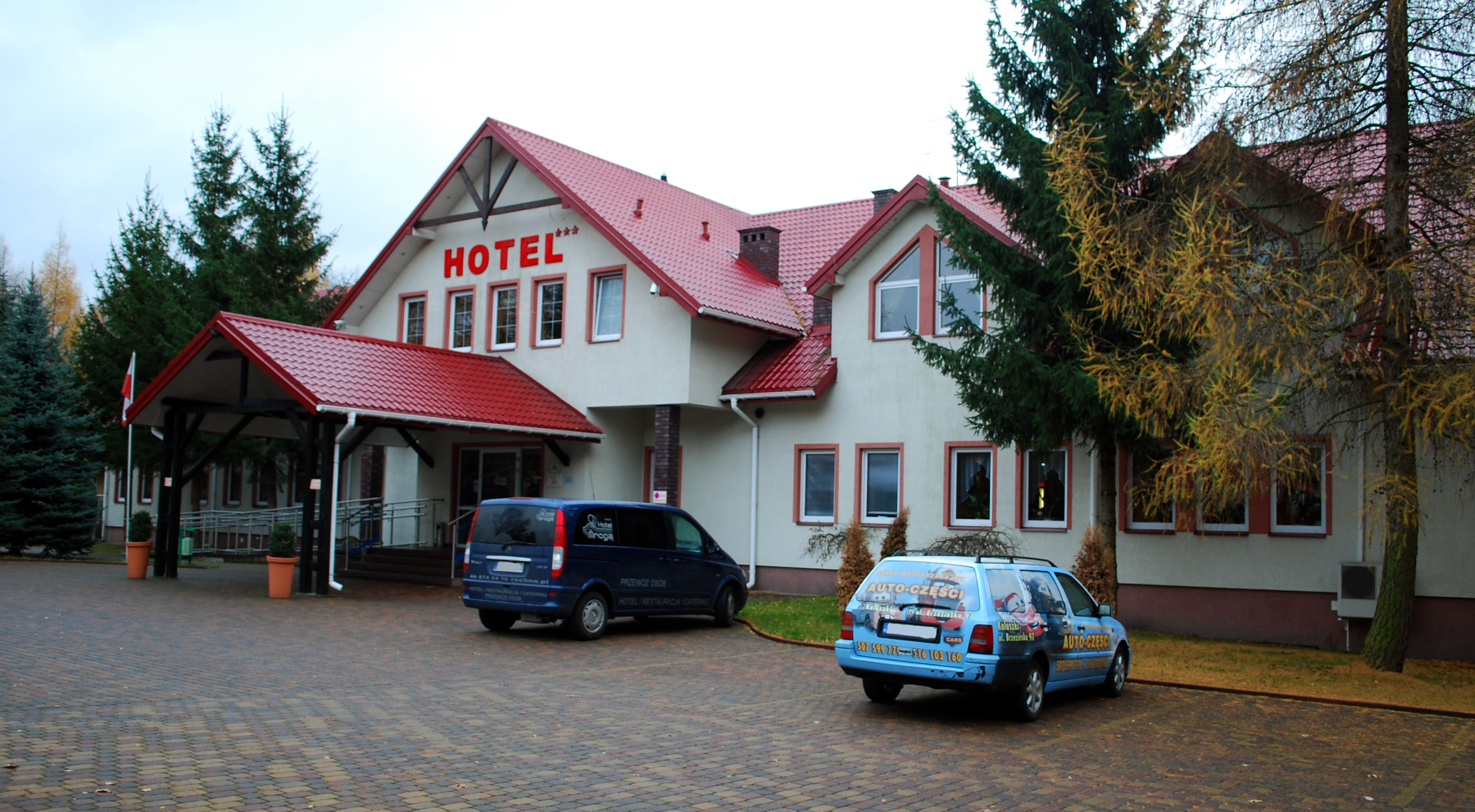

- Location within Poland
- Coordinates: 51°46′15″N 19°47′55″E
- Country: Poland
- Voivodeship: Łódź
- County: Brzeziny
- Gmina: Gmina Brzeziny
- Website: www.rochna.pl

Rochna [ˈrɔxna] is a village in the administrative district of Gmina Brzeziny, within Brzeziny County, Łódź Voivodeship, in central Poland.
