= Poćwiardówka =

- Village
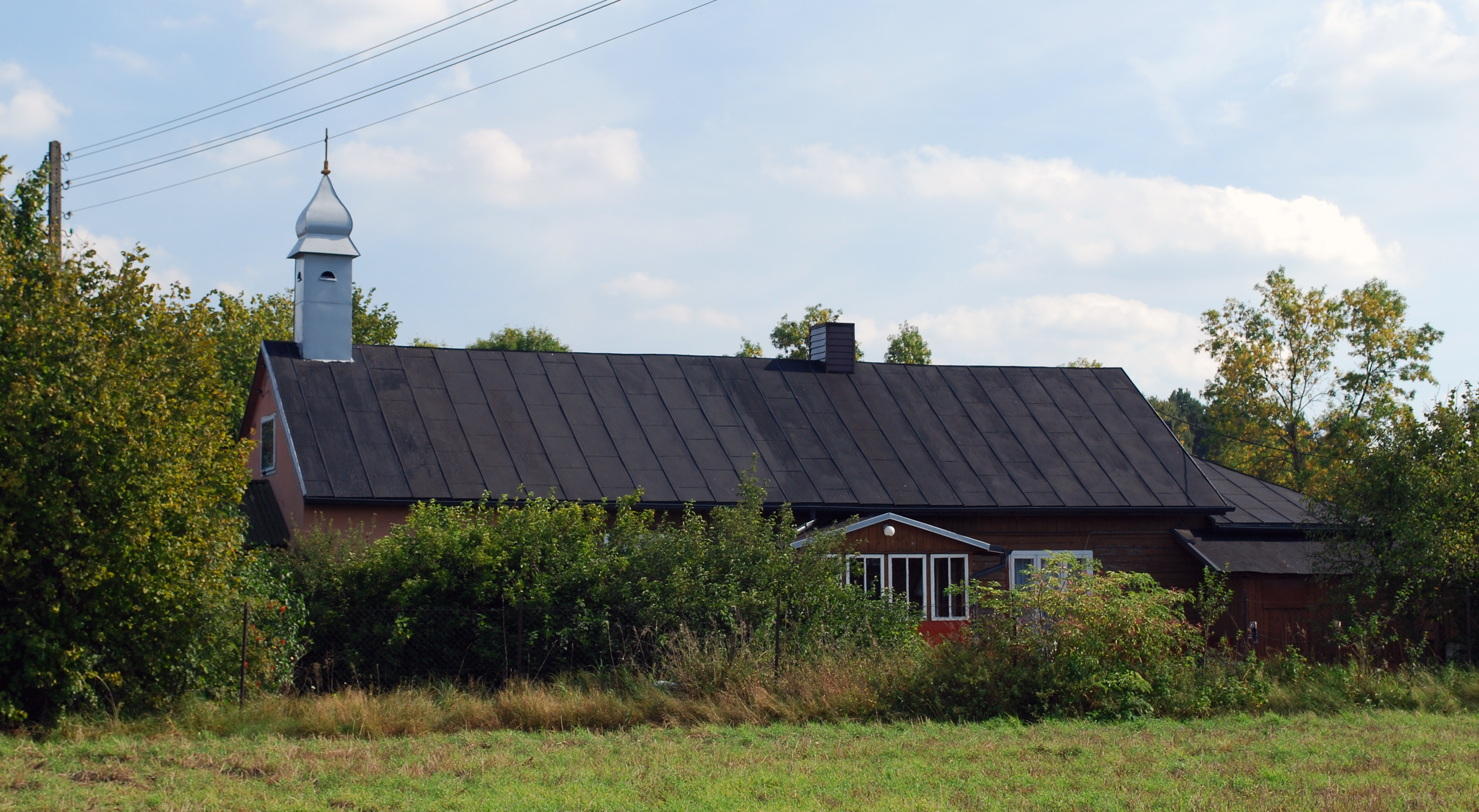

- Location within Poland
- Coordinates: 51°52′N 19°44′E
- Country: Poland
- Voivodeship: Łódź
- County: Brzeziny
- Gmina: Gmina Brzeziny

Poćwiardówka [pɔt͡ɕfjarˈdufka] is a village in the administrative district of Gmina Brzeziny, within Brzeziny County, Łódź Voivodeship, in central Poland.
