= Buczek, Brzeziny County =

Buczek
- Village
- Location within Poland
- Coordinates: 51°50′2″N 19°40′57″E
- Country: Poland
- Voivodeship: Łódź
- County: Brzeziny
- Gmina: Gmina Brzeziny

Buczek [ˈbut͡ʂɛk] is a village in the administrative district of Gmina Brzeziny, within Brzeziny County, Łódź Voivodeship, in central Poland.
