= Nowe Wągry =

Village in Gmina Rogów, Poland

- Village
- Location within Poland
- Coordinates: 51°54′00″N 19°09′00″E
- Country: Poland
- Voivodeship: Łódź
- County: Brzeziny
- Gmina: Rogów

Nowe Wągry [ˈnɔvɛ ˈvɔŋɡrɨ] is a village in the administrative district of Gmina Rogów, within Brzeziny County, Łódź Voivodeship, in central Poland.
