= Janinów, Brzeziny County =

Janinów
- Village
- Location within Poland
- Coordinates: 51°51′0″N 19°40′14″E
- Country: Poland
- Voivodeship: Łódź
- County: Brzeziny
- Gmina: Gmina Brzeziny
- Population: 50

Janinów [jaˈninuf] is a village in the administrative district of Gmina Brzeziny, within Brzeziny County, Łódź Voivodeship, in central Poland.
