= Ignaców =

Ignaców may refer to the following places in Poland:

- In Łódź Voivodeship (central Poland)
1. Ignaców, Bełchatów County
2. Ignaców, Brzeziny County
3. Ignaców, Pajęczno County
4. Ignaców, Piotrków County
5. Ignaców, Radomsko County
- In Masovian Voivodeship (east-central Poland)
1. Ignaców, Gmina Błędów
2. Ignaców, Gmina Jasieniec
3. Ignaców, Mińsk County
- In Lublin Voivodeship (eastern Poland)
- Ignaców, Zwoleń County in Masovian Voivodeship (east-central Poland)
- Ignaców, Greater Poland Voivodeship (west-central Poland)
1. Ignaców, Lublin County
2. Ignaców, Włodawa County
