= Marianów Rogowski =

- Village
- Location within Poland
- Coordinates: 51°48′44″N 19°53′48″E
- Country: Poland
- Voivodeship: Łódź
- County: Brzeziny
- Gmina: Rogów

Marianów Rogowski [maˈrjanuf rɔˈɡɔfski] is a village in the administrative district of Gmina Rogów, within Brzeziny County, Łódź Voivodeship, in central Poland.
