= Kamień, Brzeziny County =

Kamień
- Village
- Location within Poland
- Coordinates: 51°53′53″N 19°48′26″E
- Country: Poland
- Voivodeship: Łódź
- County: Brzeziny
- Gmina: Dmosin

Kamień (Polish pronunciation: [ˈkamjɛj̃]) is a village in the administrative district of Gmina Dmosin, within Brzeziny County, Łódź Voivodeship, in central Poland.
