= Wągry =

- Village
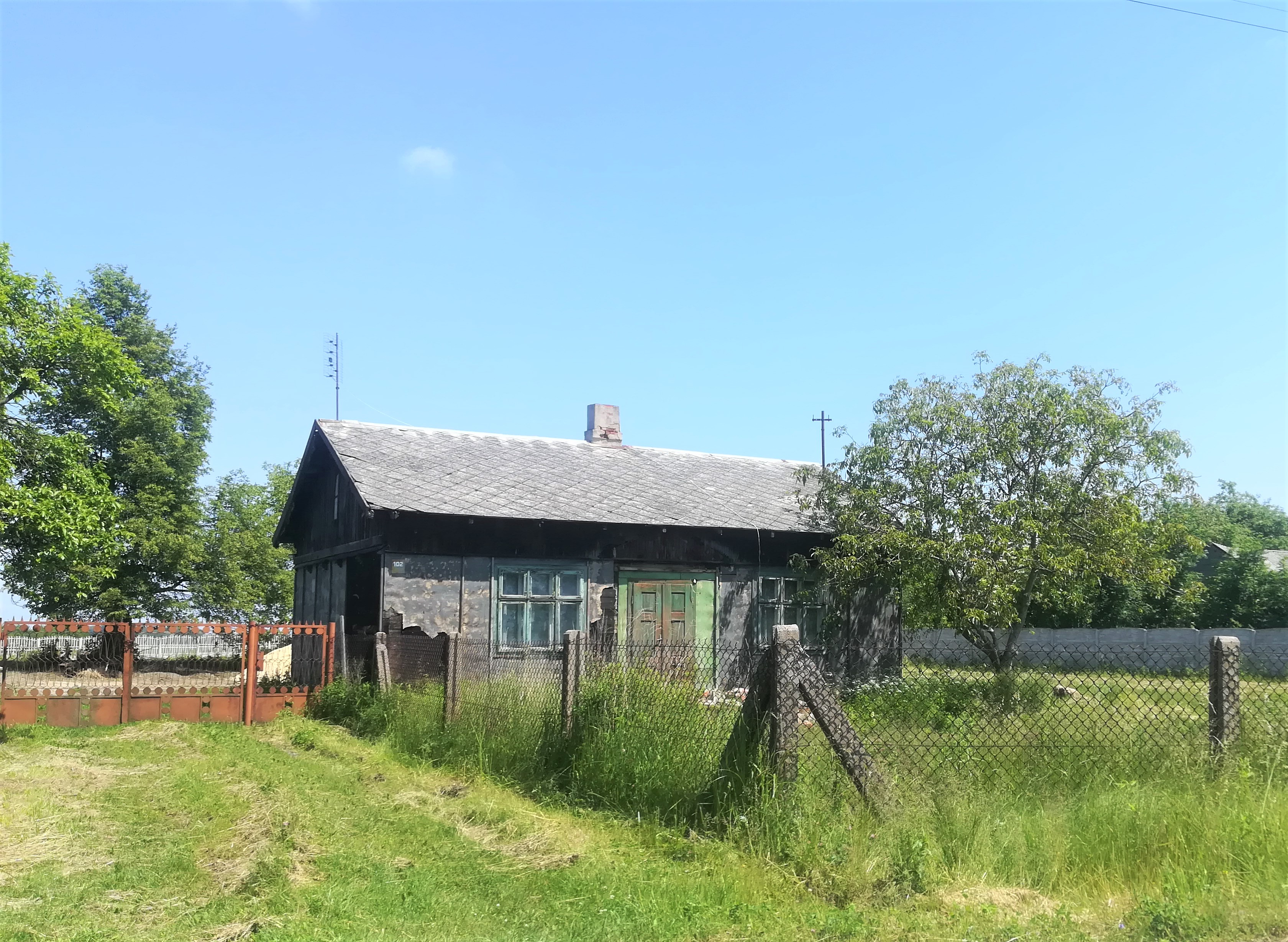

- Location within Poland
- Coordinates: 51°47′N 19°52′E
- Country: Poland
- Voivodeship: Łódź
- County: Brzeziny
- Gmina: Rogów

Wągry [ˈvɔŋɡrɨ] is a village in the administrative district of Gmina Rogów, within Brzeziny County, Łódź Voivodeship, in central Poland.
