= Popień, Gmina Rogów =

Popień
- Village
- Location within Poland
- Coordinates: 51°48′7″N 19°53′46″E
- Country: Poland
- Voivodeship: Łódź
- County: Brzeziny
- Gmina: Rogów

Popień [ˈpɔpjɛɲ] is a village in the administrative district of Gmina Rogów, within Brzeziny County, Łódź Voivodeship, in central Poland.
