= Lubowidza =

- Village
- Location within Poland
- Coordinates: 51°53′53″N 19°44′39″E
- Country: Poland
- Voivodeship: Łódź
- County: Brzeziny
- Gmina: Dmosin

Lubowidza [lubɔˈvid͡za] is a village in the administrative district of Gmina Dmosin, within Brzeziny County, Łódź Voivodeship, in central Poland.
