= Bronowice, Łódź Voivodeship =

Bronowice
- Village
- Location within Poland
- Coordinates: 51°47′43″N 19°48′56″E
- Country: Poland
- Voivodeship: Łódź
- County: Brzeziny
- Gmina: Gmina Brzeziny

Bronowice [brɔnɔˈvit͡sɛ] is a village in the administrative district of Gmina Brzeziny, within Brzeziny County, Łódź Voivodeship, in central Poland.
