= Kołacinek =

- Village
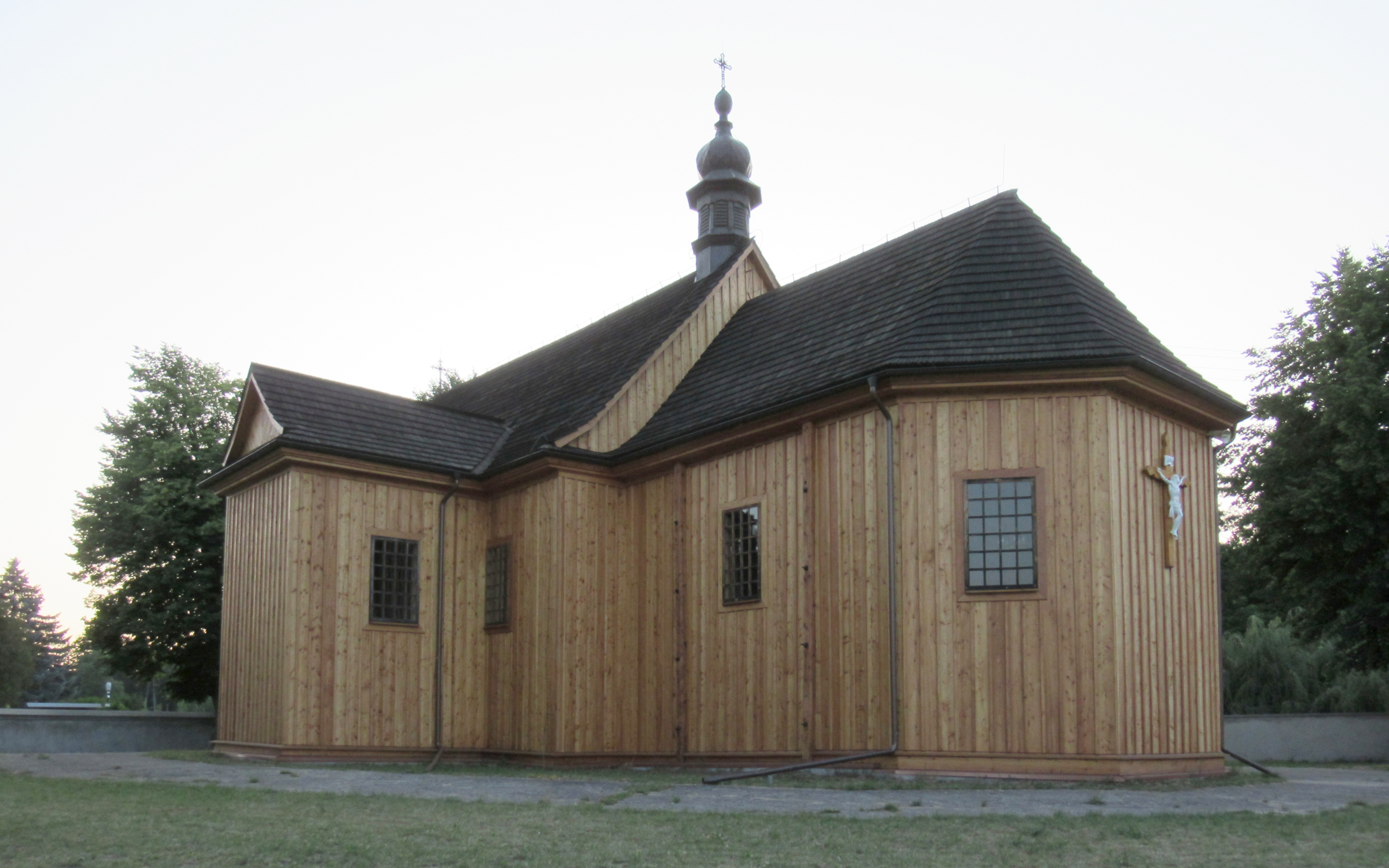
- Catholic church

- Location within Poland
- Coordinates: 51°51′54″N 19°49′49″E
- Country: Poland
- Voivodeship: Łódź
- County: Brzeziny
- Gmina: Dmosin

Kołacinek [kɔwaˈt͡ɕinɛk] is a village in the administrative district of Gmina Dmosin, within Brzeziny County, Łódź Voivodeship, in central Poland.

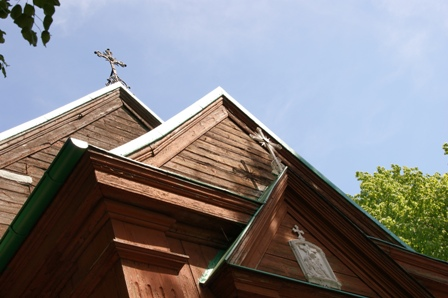
18th-century church in Kolacinek

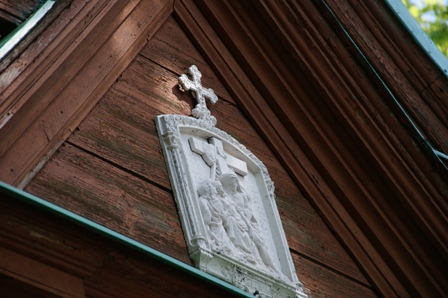
Details of the outside

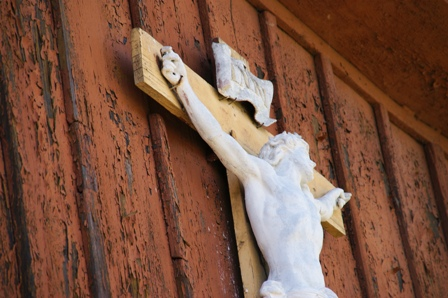
Details of the outside
