= Żabiniec =

Żabiniec may refer to the following places:

- Żabiniec, Kuyavian-Pomeranian Voivodeship (north-central Poland)
- Żabiniec, Łódź Voivodeship (central Poland)
- Żabiniec, Podlaskie Voivodeship (north-east Poland)
- Żabiniec, Świętokrzyskie Voivodeship (south-central Poland)
- Żabiniec, Kluczbork County in Opole Voivodeship (south-west Poland)
- Żabiniec, Namysłów County in Opole Voivodeship (south-west Poland)
- Żabiniec, Pomeranian Voivodeship (north Poland)
- Żabiniec, West Pomeranian Voivodeship (north-west Poland)
- Żabiniec, part of the Prądnik Biały district of Kraków
