= Gałkówek-Kolonia =

- Village
- Location within Poland
- Coordinates: 51°45′28″N 19°41′21″E
- Country: Poland
- Voivodeship: Łódź
- County: Brzeziny
- Gmina: Gmina Brzeziny

Gałkówek-Kolonia [ɡau̯ˈkuvɛk kɔˈlɔɲa] is a village in the administrative district of Gmina Brzeziny, within Brzeziny County, Łódź Voivodeship, in central Poland.
