= Gaj, Brzeziny County =

Gaj
- Village
- Location within Poland
- Coordinates: 51°45′25″N 19°45′25″E
- Country: Poland
- Voivodeship: Łódź
- County: Brzeziny
- Gmina: Gmina Brzeziny
- Population: 50

Gaj [ɡai̯] is a village in the administrative district of Gmina Brzeziny, within Brzeziny County, Łódź Voivodeship, in central Poland.
