= Przecław, Łódź Voivodeship =

Przecław
- Village
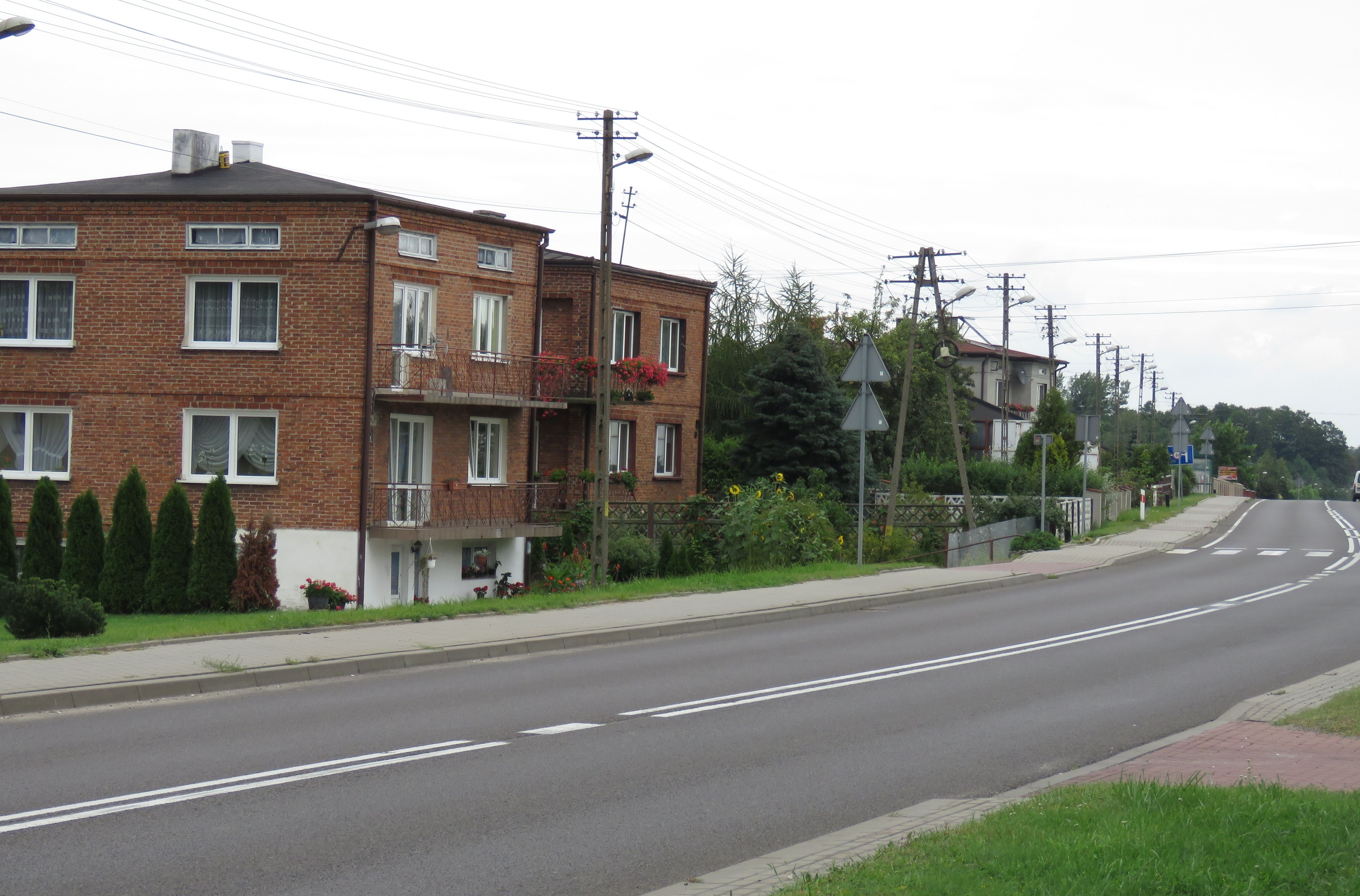

- Location within Poland
- Coordinates: 51°48′6″N 19°47′37″E
- Country: Poland
- Voivodeship: Łódź
- County: Brzeziny
- Gmina: Gmina Brzeziny

Przecław [ˈpʂɛt͡swaf] (1943–1945German Zollingen) is a village in the administrative district of Gmina Brzeziny, within Brzeziny County, Łódź Voivodeship, in central Poland.
