= Szymaniszki =

- Village
- Location within Poland
- Coordinates: 51°50′N 19°48′E
- Country: Poland
- Voivodeship: Łódź
- County: Brzeziny
- Gmina: Gmina Brzeziny

Szymaniszki (Polish pronunciation: [ʂɨmaˈɲiʂkʲi]) is a village in the administrative district of Gmina Brzeziny, within Brzeziny County, Łódź Voivodeship, in central Poland.
