= Szczecin, Łódź Voivodeship =

Szczecin
- Village
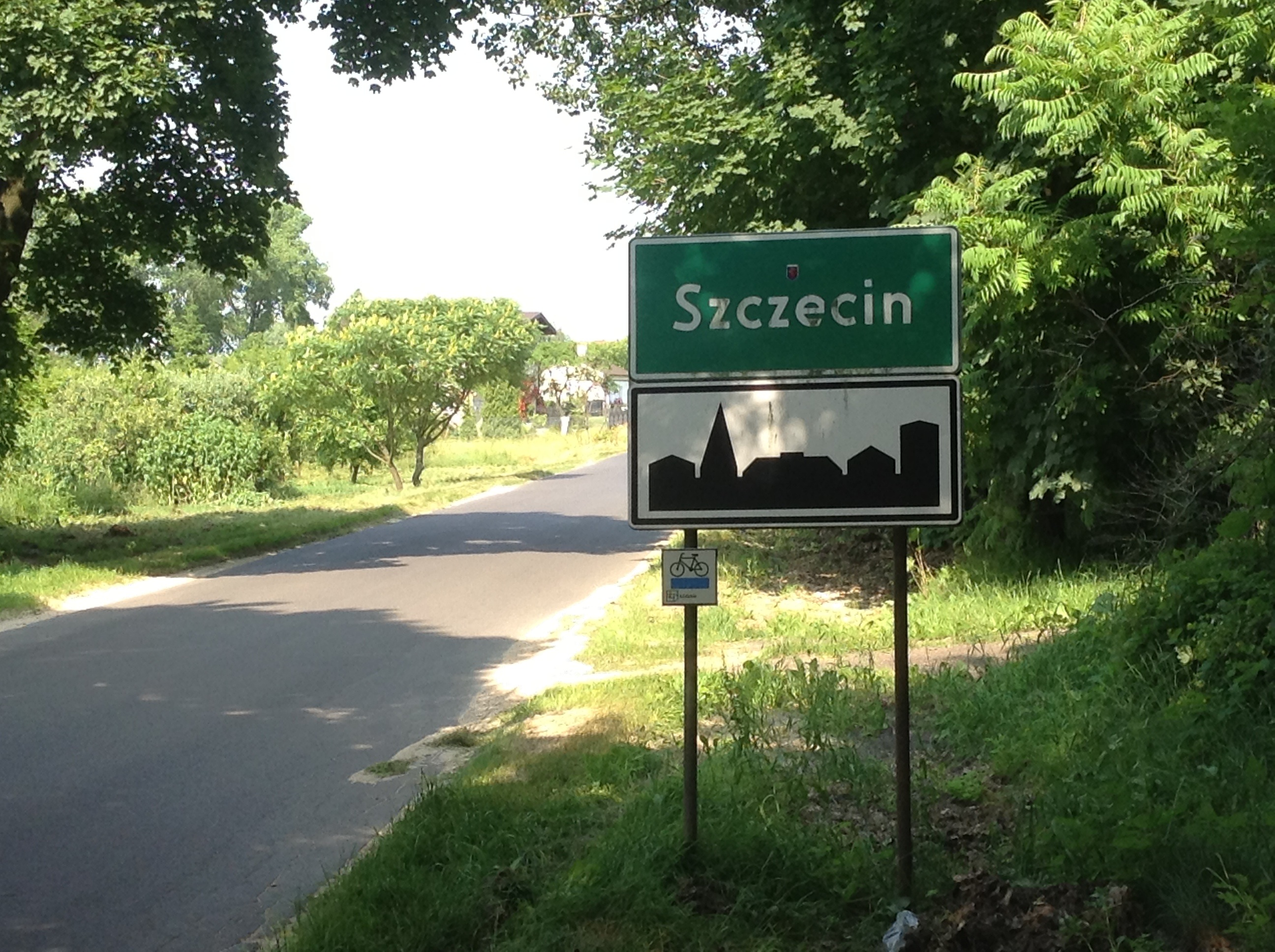

- Location within Poland
- Coordinates: 51°55′11″N 19°43′0″E
- Country: Poland
- Voivodeship: Łódź
- County: Brzeziny
- Gmina: Dmosin
- Time zone: UTC+1 (CET)
  - Summer (DST): UTC+2 (CEST)
- Vehicle registration: EBR

Szczecin (Polish pronunciation: [ˈʂtʂɛtɕin]) is a village in the administrative district of Gmina Dmosin, within Brzeziny County, Łódź Voivodeship, in central Poland.
