= Paprotnia =

Paprotnia may refer to the following places:

- Paprotnia, Brzeziny County in Łódź Voivodeship (central Poland)
- Paprotnia, Rawa County in Łódź Voivodeship (central Poland)
- Paprotnia, Zduńska Wola County in Łódź Voivodeship (central Poland)
- Paprotnia, Lublin Voivodeship (east Poland)
- Paprotnia, Kozienice County in Masovian Voivodeship (east-central Poland)
- Paprotnia, Siedlce County in Masovian Voivodeship (east-central Poland)
- Paprotnia, Sochaczew County in Masovian Voivodeship (east-central Poland)
- Paprotnia, Greater Poland Voivodeship (west-central Poland)
