= Józefów, Brzeziny County =

Józefów
- Village
- Location within Poland
- Coordinates: 51°49′39″N 19°53′7″E
- Country: Poland
- Voivodeship: Łódź
- County: Brzeziny
- Gmina: Rogów

Józefów (Polish pronunciation: [juˈzɛfuf]) is a village in the administrative district of Gmina Rogów, within Brzeziny County, Łódź Voivodeship, in central Poland.
