= Kobylin, Łódź Voivodeship =

Kobylin
- Village
- Location within Poland
- Coordinates: 51°51′15″N 19°50′40″E
- Country: Poland
- Voivodeship: Łódź
- County: Brzeziny
- Gmina: Rogów

Kobylin [kɔˈbɨlin] is a village in the administrative district of Gmina Rogów, within Brzeziny County, Łódź Voivodeship, in central Poland.
