= Grzmiąca =

Grzmiąca may refer to the following places in Poland:

- Grzmiąca, Lower Silesian Voivodeship (south-west Poland)
- Grzmiąca, Pomeranian Voivodeship (north Poland)
- Grzmiąca, Łódź Voivodeship (central Poland)
- Grzmiąca, Białobrzegi County in Masovian Voivodeship (east-central Poland)
- Grzmiąca, Gmina Żabia Wola, Grodzisk County in Masovian Voivodeship (east-central Poland)
- Grzmiąca, Lubusz Voivodeship (west Poland)
- Grzmiąca, West Pomeranian Voivodeship (north-west Poland)
