= Wiesiołów, Łódź Voivodeship =

Wiesiołów
- Village
- Location within Poland
- Coordinates: 51°56′6″N 19°47′58″E
- Country: Poland
- Voivodeship: Łódź
- County: Brzeziny
- Gmina: Dmosin
- Population: 50

Wiesiołów [vjɛˈɕɔwuf] is a village in the administrative district of Gmina Dmosin, within Brzeziny County, Łódź Voivodeship, in central Poland.
