= Polik (disambiguation) =

Polik is a trade-name for the antifungal drug Haloprogin.

Polik may also refer to the following places in Poland:

- Polik, Łódź Voivodeship (central Poland)
- Polik, Garwolin County in Masovian Voivodeship (east-central Poland)
- Polik, Sierpc County in Masovian Voivodeship (east-central Poland)
