= Zacywilki =

- Village
- Location within Poland
- Coordinates: 51°52′N 19°51′E
- Country: Poland
- Voivodeship: Łódź
- County: Brzeziny
- Gmina: Rogów

Zacywilki [zat͡sɨˈvilki] is a village in the administrative district of Gmina Rogów, within Brzeziny County, Łódź Voivodeship, in central Poland.
