= Teodorów, Brzeziny County =

Teodorów
- Village
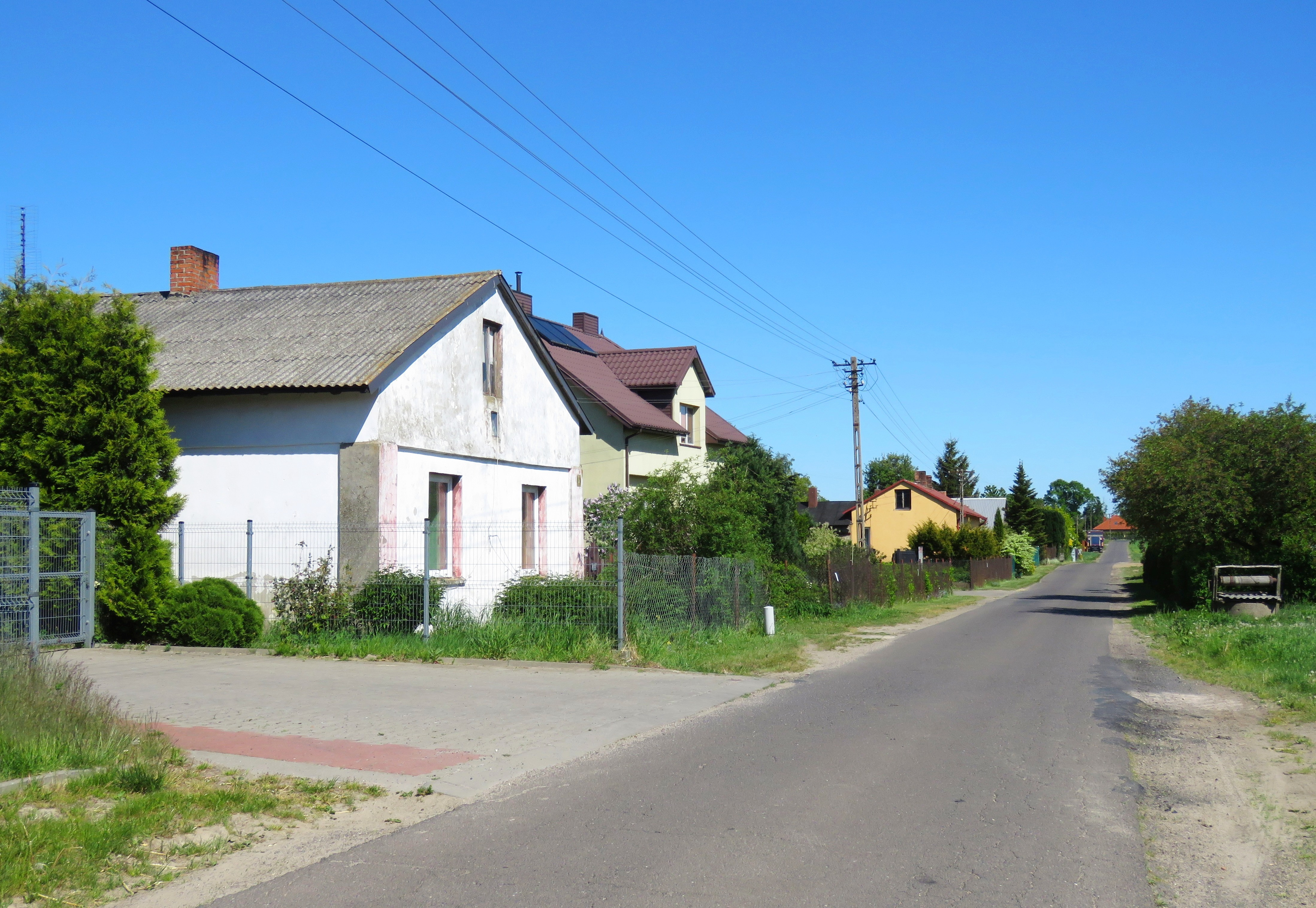

- Location within Poland
- Coordinates: 51°48′55″N 19°40′32″E
- Country: Poland
- Voivodeship: Łódź
- County: Brzeziny
- Gmina: Gmina Brzeziny
- Population: 40

Teodorów [tɛɔˈdɔruf] is a village in the administrative district of Gmina Brzeziny, within Brzeziny County, Łódź Voivodeship, in central Poland.
