= Nadolna-Kolonia =

- Village
- Location within Poland
- Coordinates: 51°53′21″N 19°50′22″E
- Country: Poland
- Voivodeship: Łódź
- County: Brzeziny
- Gmina: Dmosin

Nadolna-Kolonia [naˈdɔlna kɔˈlɔɲa] is a village in the administrative district of Gmina Dmosin, within Brzeziny County, Łódź Voivodeship, in central Poland.
