= Jabłonów =

Jabłonów may refer to the following places in Poland:

- Jabłonów, Lower Silesian Voivodeship (south-west Poland)
- Jabłonów, Łódź Voivodeship (central Poland)
- Jabłonów, Masovian Voivodeship (east-central Poland)
- Jabłonów, Lubusz Voivodeship (west Poland)

== See also ==
- Yabluniv (Polish: Jabłonów), Ukraine
