= Teresin, Brzeziny County =

Teresin
- Village
- Location within Poland
- Coordinates: 51°55′15″N 19°51′56″E
- Country: Poland
- Voivodeship: Łódź
- County: Brzeziny
- Gmina: Dmosin

Teresin (Polish pronunciation: [tɛˈrɛɕin]) is a village in the administrative district of Gmina Dmosin, within Brzeziny County, Łódź Voivodeship, in central Poland.
