= Zawady, Brzeziny County =

Zawady
- Village
- Location within Poland
- Coordinates: 51°55′44″N 19°48′32″E
- Country: Poland
- Voivodeship: Łódź
- County: Brzeziny
- Gmina: Dmosin

Zawady [zaˈvadɨ] is a village in the administrative district of Gmina Dmosin, within Brzeziny County, Łódź Voivodeship, in central Poland.
