= Kraszew Wielki =

- Village
- Location within Poland
- Coordinates: 51°54′57″N 19°48′39″E
- Country: Poland
- Voivodeship: Łódź
- County: Brzeziny
- Gmina: Dmosin

Kraszew Wielki (Polish pronunciation: [ˈkraʂɛv ˈvjɛlkʲi]) is a village in the administrative district of Gmina Dmosin, within Brzeziny County, Łódź Voivodeship, in central Poland.
