= Nowostawy Dolne =

- Village
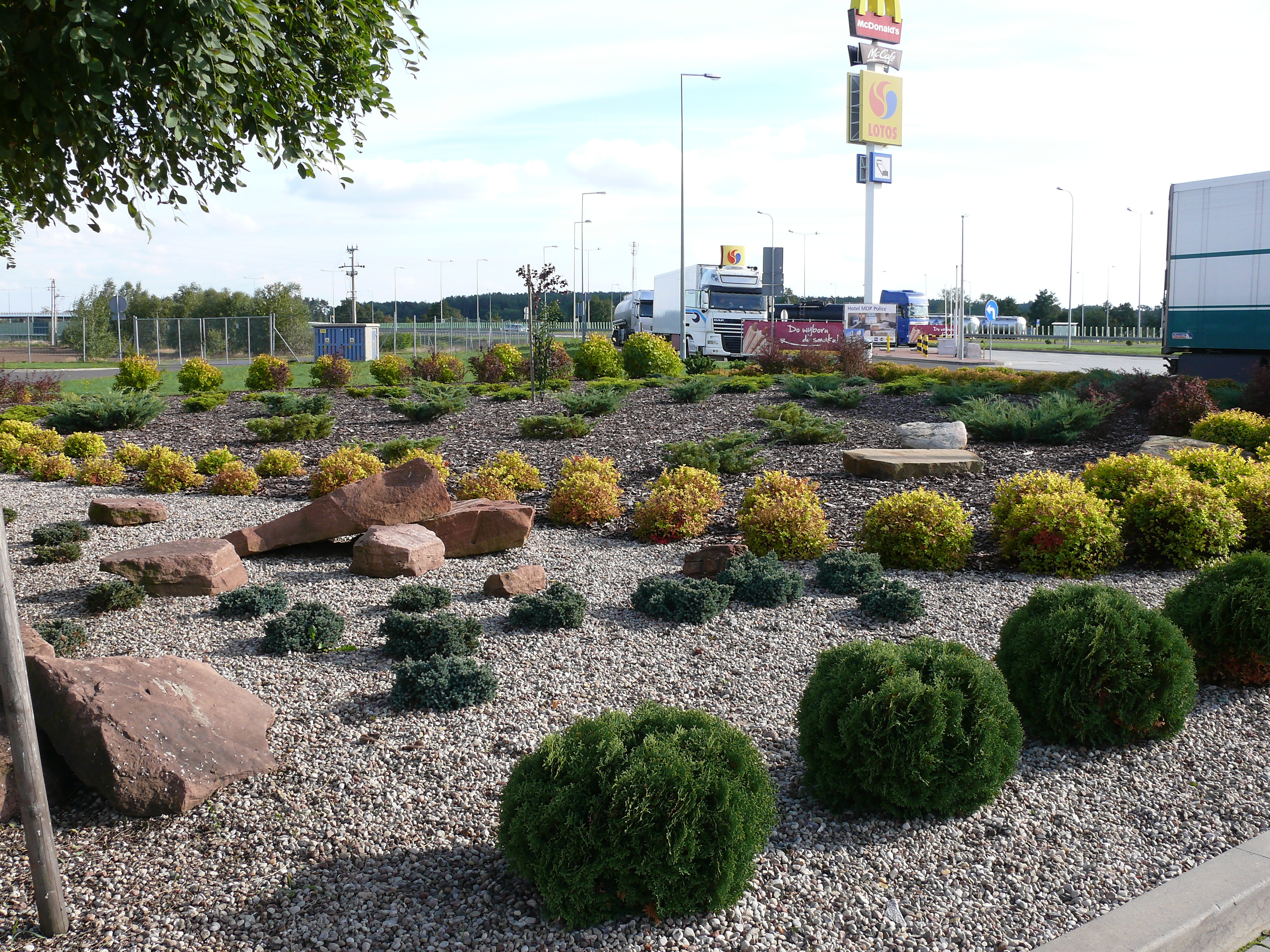

- Location within Poland
- Coordinates: 51°54′13″N 19°41′44″E
- Country: Poland
- Voivodeship: Łódź
- County: Brzeziny
- Gmina: Dmosin
- Population (approx.): 200

Nowostawy Dolne [nɔvɔsˈtavɨ ˈdɔlnɛ] is a village in the administrative district of Gmina Dmosin, within Brzeziny County, Łódź Voivodeship, in central Poland.

The village has an approximate population of 200.
