= Helenówka =

Helenówka may refer to the following places:

- Helenówka, Łódź Voivodeship (central Poland)
- Helenówka, Masovian Voivodeship (east-central Poland)
- Helenówka, Świętokrzyskie Voivodeship (south-central Poland)
