= Osiny, Brzeziny County =

Osiny
- Village
- Location within Poland
- Coordinates: 51°56′13″N 19°44′11″E
- Country: Poland
- Voivodeship: Łódź
- County: Brzeziny
- Gmina: Dmosin

Osiny [ɔˈɕinɨ] is a village in the administrative district of Gmina Dmosin, within Brzeziny County, Łódź Voivodeship, in central Poland.
