= Helenów, Brzeziny County =

Helenów
- Village
- Location within Poland
- Coordinates: 51°47′6″N 19°41′34″E
- Country: Poland
- Voivodeship: Łódź
- County: Brzeziny
- Gmina: Gmina Brzeziny

Helenów [xɛˈlɛnuf] is a village in the administrative district of Gmina Brzeziny, within Brzeziny County, Łódź Voivodeship, in central Poland.
