= Ząbki (disambiguation) =

Ząbki may refer to the following places:

- Ząbki, Łódź Voivodeship (central Poland)
- Ząbki in Masovian Voivodeship (east-central Poland)
- Ząbki, West Pomeranian Voivodeship (north-west Poland)
