= Osiny-Zarębów =

- Village
- Location within Poland
- Coordinates: 51°56′17″N 19°42′30″E
- Country: Poland
- Voivodeship: Łódź
- County: Brzeziny
- Gmina: Dmosin

Osiny-Zarębów [ɔˈɕinɨ zaˈrɛmbuf] is a village in the administrative district of Gmina Dmosin, within Brzeziny County, Łódź Voivodeship, in central Poland.
