= Kotulin, Łódź Voivodeship =

Kotulin
- Village
- Location within Poland
- Coordinates: 51°53′1″N 19°51′51″E
- Country: Poland
- Voivodeship: Łódź
- County: Brzeziny
- Gmina: Rogów

Kotulin [kɔˈtulin] is a village in the administrative district of Gmina Rogów, within Brzeziny County, Łódź Voivodeship, in central Poland.
