= Bogdanka =

Bogdanka may refer to the following places:

- Bogdanka, a stream flowing through the Jeżyce district of Poznań
- Bogdanka, Łódź Voivodeship (central Poland)
- Bogdanka, Lublin Voivodeship (east Poland)
- Bogdanka, West Pomeranian Voivodeship (north-west Poland)
