= Dąbrówka Mała (disambiguation) =

Dąbrówka Mała ("little Dąbrówka") is a district of Katowice in southern Poland.

Dąbrówka Mała may also refer to the following villages:

- Dąbrówka Mała, Łódź Voivodeship (central Poland)
- Dąbrówka Mała, Lubusz Voivodeship (west Poland)
- Dąbrówka Mała, Olsztyn County in Warmian-Masurian Voivodeship (north Poland)
- Dąbrówka Mała, Węgorzewo County in Warmian-Masurian Voivodeship (north Poland)
