= Olsza, Łódź Voivodeship =

Olsza
- Village
- Location within Poland
- Coordinates: 51°49′N 19°51′E
- Country: Poland
- Voivodeship: Łódź
- County: Brzeziny
- Gmina: Rogów

Olsza [ˈɔlʂa] is a village in the administrative district of Gmina Rogów, within Brzeziny County, Łódź Voivodeship, in central Poland.
