= Kołacin, Łódź Voivodeship =

Kołacin
- Village
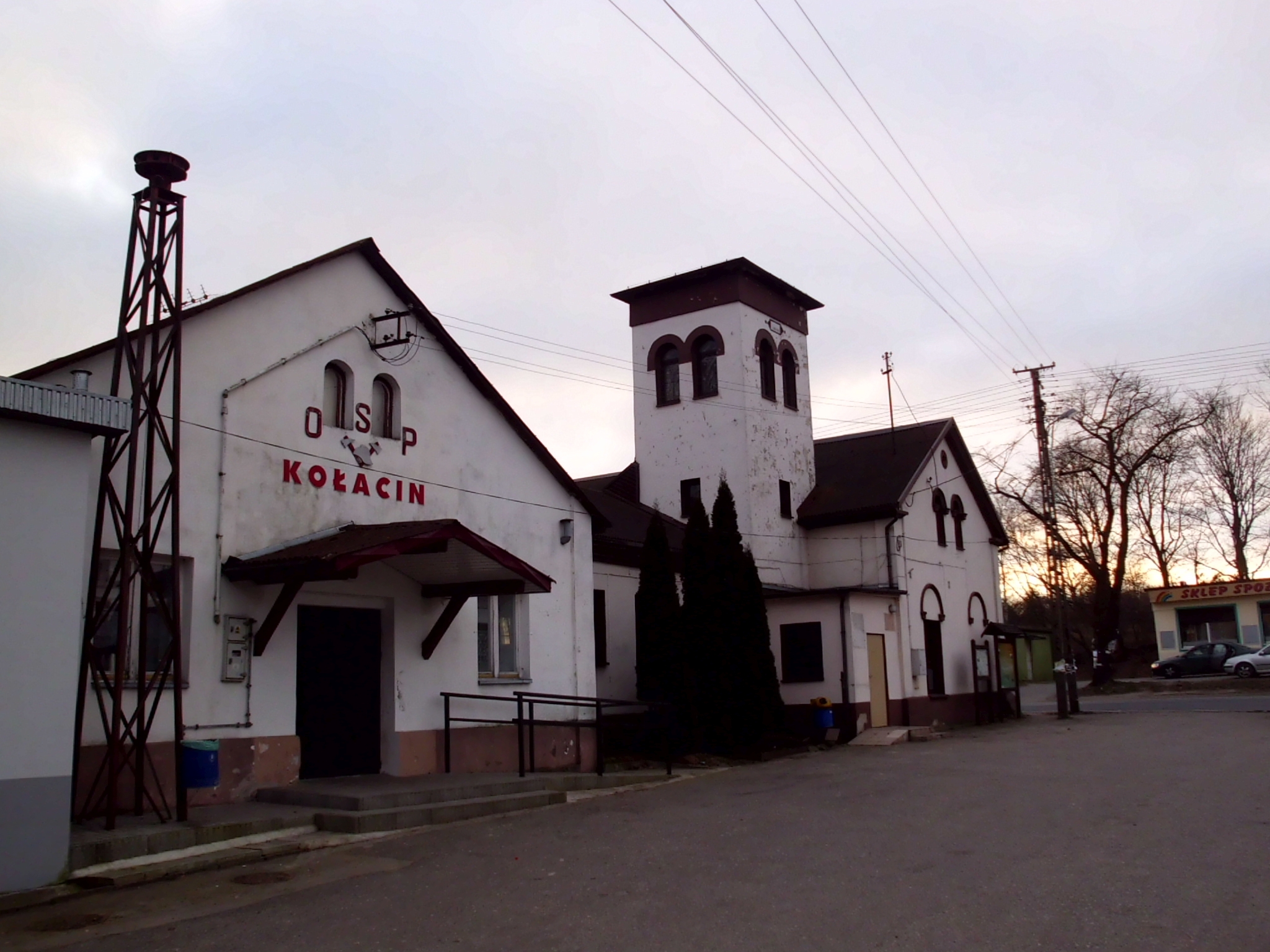

- Location within Poland
- Coordinates: 51°51′26″N 19°49′8″E
- Country: Poland
- Voivodeship: Łódź
- County: Brzeziny
- Gmina: Dmosin

Kołacin [kɔˈwat͡ɕin] is a village in the administrative district of Gmina Dmosin, within Brzeziny County, Łódź Voivodeship, in central Poland.
