= Sadowa =

Sadowa may refer to:

== Places ==
- Sadowa, the German name for the town of Sadová in the Czech Republic
- Sadowa, the German name for Sadova, in the historical region of Bukovina, Suceava county, northeastern Romania
- Sadowa, Łódź Voivodeship, a village in central Poland
- Sadowa, Masovian Voivodeship, a village in east-central Poland
- Sadowa, Ontario, a town in the municipality of Kawartha Lakes, Ontario, Canada
- Sadowa Wisznia, Polish name for a small city once part of eastern Poland, now in Ukraine

== People ==
- Lidia Sadowa (born 1985), Polish actress

== Historic events ==
- Battle of Sadowa (also Battle of Königgrätz), the decisive 1866 battle of the Austro-Prussian War

== Games ==
- Sadowa (game), a 1977 wargame depicting the Battle of Sadowa
