= Jordanów (disambiguation) =

Jordanów may refer to the following places:

- Jordanów in Lesser Poland Voivodeship (south Poland)
- Jordanów, Łódź Voivodeship (central Poland)
- Jordanów, Masovian Voivodeship (east-central Poland)
