= Jasień, Brzeziny County =

Jasień
- Village
- Location within Poland
- Coordinates: 51°50′23″N 19°50′24″E
- Country: Poland
- Voivodeship: Łódź
- County: Brzeziny
- Gmina: Rogów

Jasień [ˈjaɕɛɲ] is a village in the administrative district of Gmina Rogów, within Brzeziny County, Łódź Voivodeship, in central Poland.
