= Marianów Kołacki =

- Village
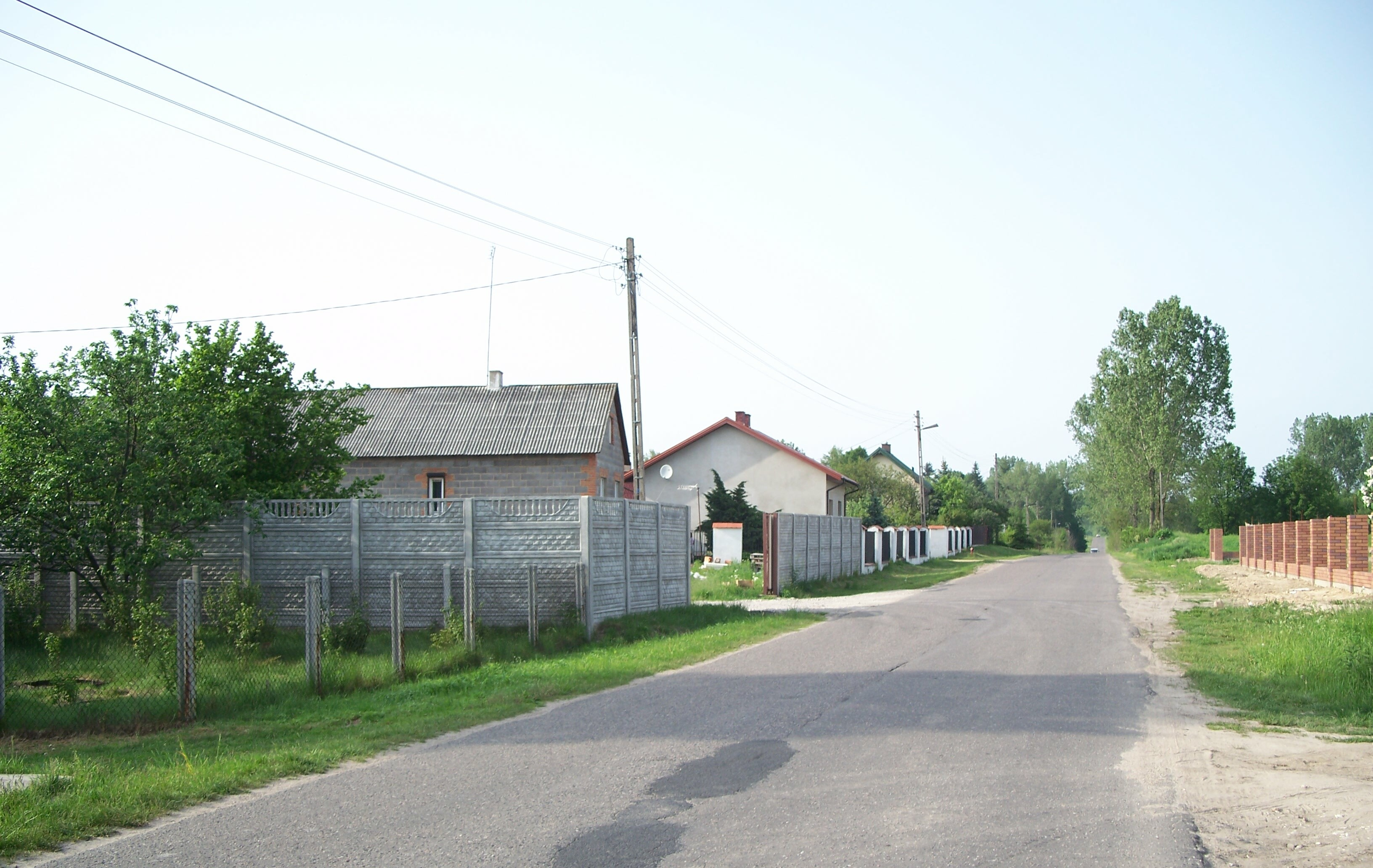

- Location within Poland
- Coordinates: 51°50′56″N 19°45′14″E
- Country: Poland
- Voivodeship: Łódź
- County: Brzeziny
- Gmina: Gmina Brzeziny

Marianów Kołacki [maˈrjanuf kɔˈwat͡ski] is a village in the administrative district of Gmina Brzeziny, within Brzeziny County, Łódź Voivodeship, in central Poland.
