= Michałów, Gmina Brzeziny =

Michałów
- Village
- Location within Poland
- Coordinates: 51°48′43″N 19°49′19″E
- Country: Poland
- Voivodeship: Łódź
- County: Brzeziny
- Gmina: Gmina Brzeziny
- Population: 20

Michałów [miˈxawuf] is a village in the administrative district of Gmina Brzeziny, within Brzeziny County, Łódź Voivodeship, in central Poland.
