= Ignaców, Brzeziny County =

Ignaców
- Village
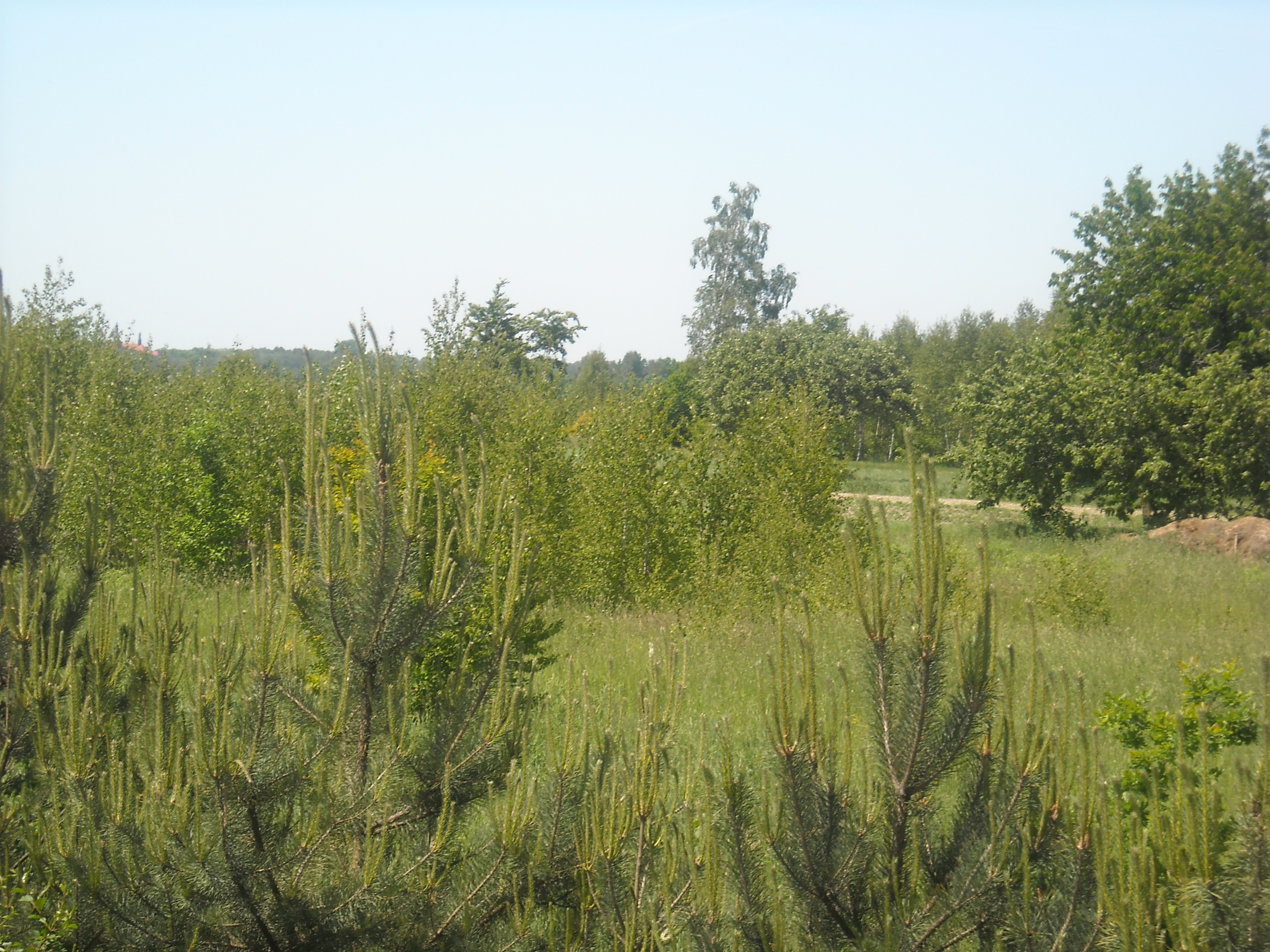

- Location within Poland
- Coordinates: 51°44′40″N 19°40′3″E
- Country: Poland
- Voivodeship: Łódź
- County: Brzeziny
- Gmina: Gmina Brzeziny

Ignaców [iɡˈnat͡suf] is a village in the administrative district of Gmina Brzeziny, within Brzeziny County, Łódź Voivodeship, in central Poland.
