= Polik, Łódź Voivodeship =

Polik
- Village
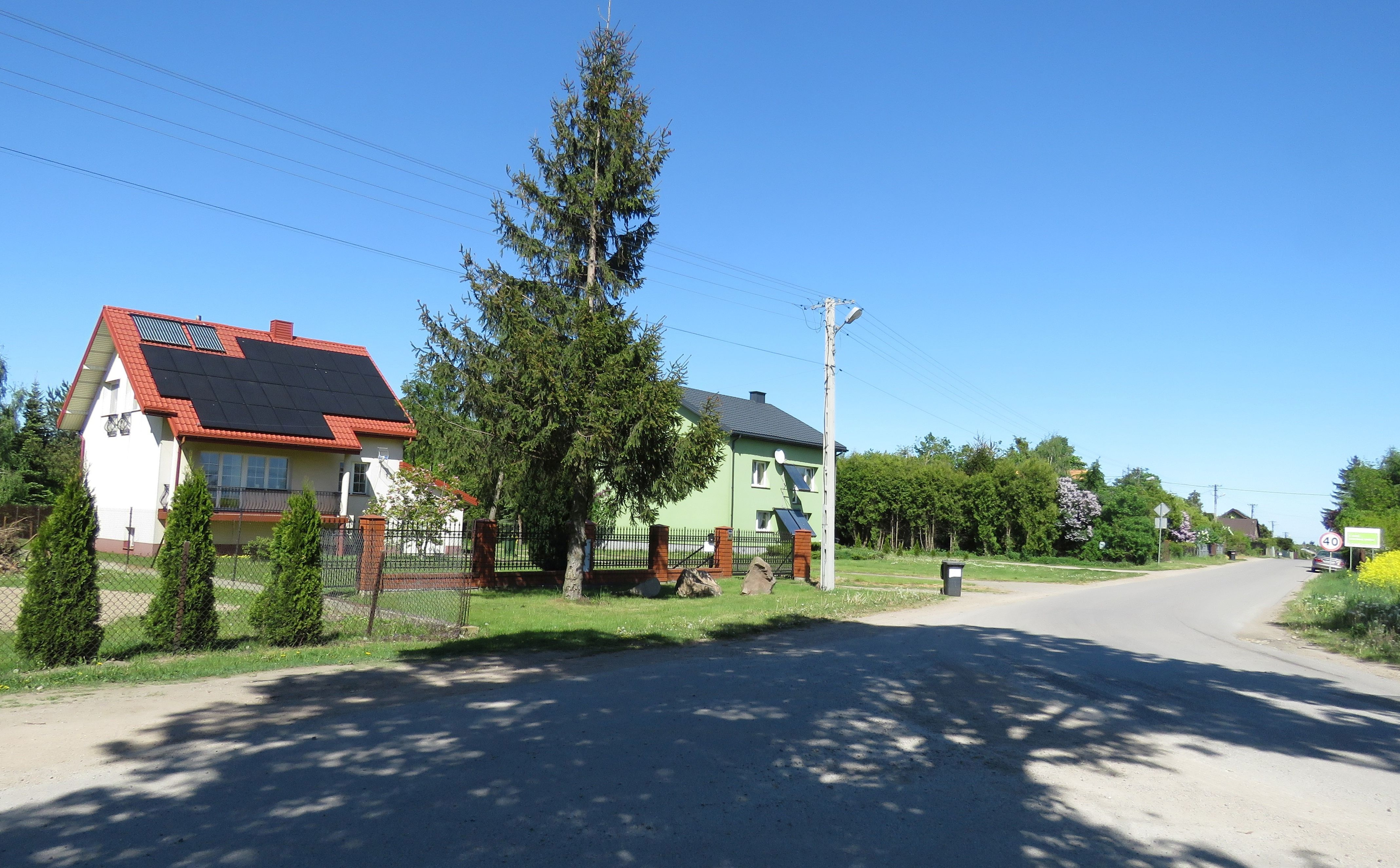

- Location within Poland
- Coordinates: 51°48′54″N 19°41′26″E
- Country: Poland
- Voivodeship: Łódź
- County: Brzeziny
- Gmina: Gmina Brzeziny

Polik [ˈpɔlik] is a village in the administrative district of Gmina Brzeziny, within Brzeziny County, Łódź Voivodeship, in central Poland.
