= Bogdanka, Łódź Voivodeship =

Bogdanka
- Village
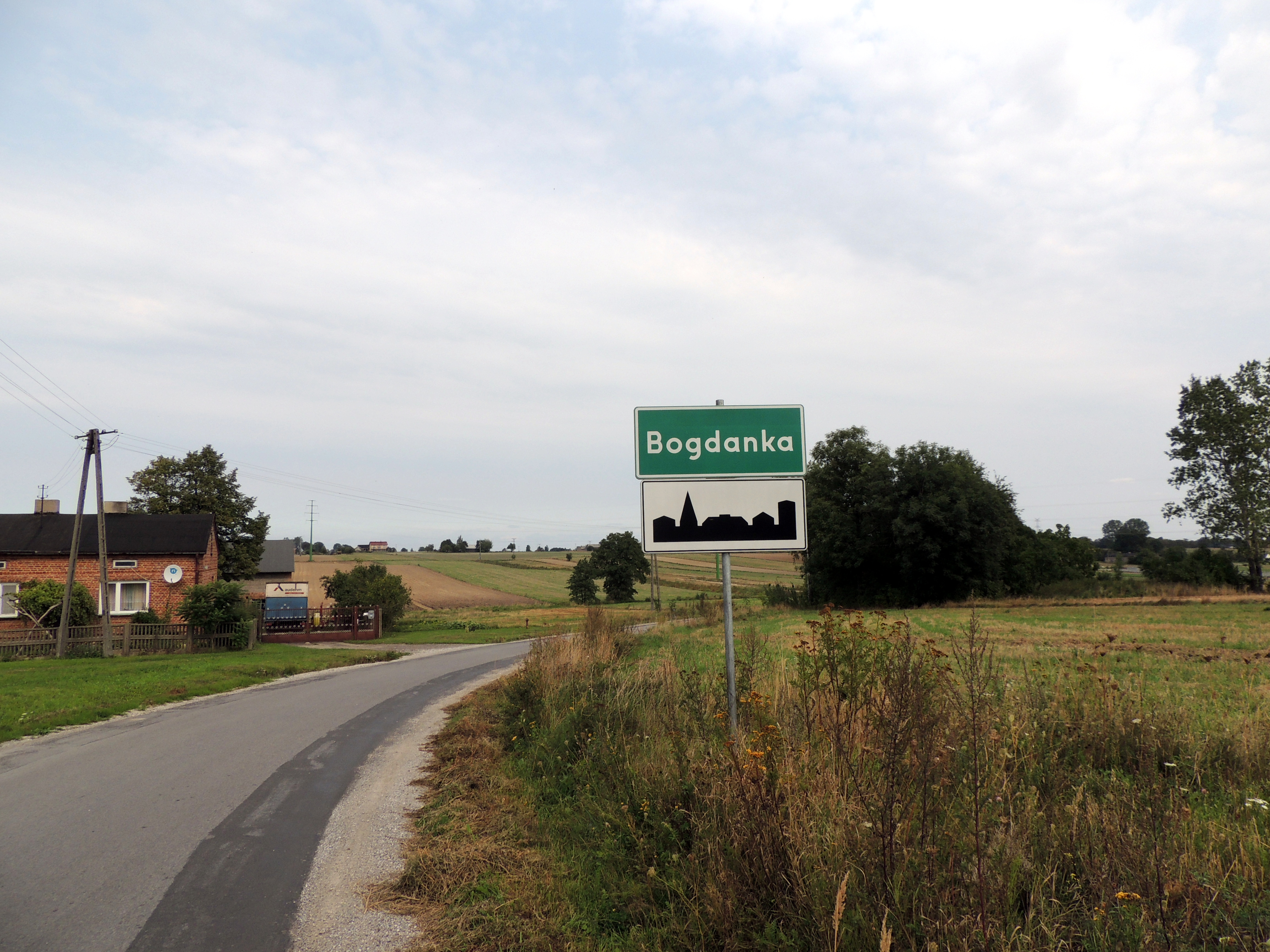

- Location within Poland
- Coordinates: 51°46′5″N 19°46′42″E
- Country: Poland
- Voivodeship: Łódź
- County: Brzeziny
- Gmina: Gmina Brzeziny

Bogdanka [bɔɡˈdaŋka] is a village in the administrative district of Gmina Brzeziny, within Brzeziny County, Łódź Voivodeship, in central Poland.
