= Paprotnia, Brzeziny County =

Paprotnia
- Village
- Location within Poland
- Coordinates: 51°48′13″N 19°41′32″E
- Country: Poland
- Voivodeship: Łódź
- County: Brzeziny
- Gmina: Gmina Brzeziny

Paprotnia [paˈprɔtɲa] is a village in the administrative district of Gmina Brzeziny, within Brzeziny County, Łódź Voivodeship, in central Poland.
