= Jaroszki, Łódź Voivodeship =

Jaroszki
- Village
- Location within Poland
- Coordinates: 51°49′20″N 19°40′15″E
- Country: Poland
- Voivodeship: Łódź
- County: Brzeziny
- Gmina: Gmina Brzeziny

Jaroszki [jaˈrɔʂki] is a village in the administrative district of Gmina Brzeziny, within Brzeziny County, Łódź Voivodeship, in central Poland.
