= Sadowa, Łódź Voivodeship =

Sadowa
- Village
- Location within Poland
- Coordinates: 51°47′36″N 19°48′10″E
- Country: Poland
- Voivodeship: Łódź
- County: Brzeziny
- Gmina: Gmina Brzeziny
- Population: 20

Sadowa [saˈdɔva] is a village in the administrative district of Gmina Brzeziny, within Brzeziny County, Łódź Voivodeship, in central Poland.
