= Jabłonów, Łódź Voivodeship =

Jabłonów
- Village
- Location within Poland
- Coordinates: 51°51′39″N 19°45′22″E
- Country: Poland
- Voivodeship: Łódź
- County: Brzeziny
- Gmina: Gmina Brzeziny

Jabłonów [jaˈbwɔnuf] is a village in the administrative district of Gmina Brzeziny, within Brzeziny County, Łódź Voivodeship, in central Poland.
