= Michałowo (disambiguation) =

Michałowo is a town in Podlaskie Voivodeship in north-eastern Poland.

Michałowo may also refer to the following places:

- Michałowo, part of the district of Nowe Miasto in Poznań
- Michałowo, Gostyń County in Greater Poland Voivodeship (west-central Poland)
- Michałowo, Słupca County in Greater Poland Voivodeship (west-central Poland)
- Michałowo, Gmina Dominowo, Środa County in Greater Poland Voivodeship (west-central Poland)
- Michałowo, Aleksandrów County in Kuyavian-Pomeranian Voivodeship (central Poland)
- Michałowo, Lipno County in Kuyavian-Pomeranian Voivodeship (central Poland)
- Michałowo, Włocławek County in Kuyavian-Pomeranian Voivodeship (central Poland)
- Michałowo, Gmina Czarnia in Masovian Voivodeship (north-central Poland)
- Michałowo, Gmina Goworowo in Masovian Voivodeship (east-central Poland)
- Michałowo, Płońsk County in Masovian Voivodeship (north-central Poland)
- Michałowo, Malbork County in Pomeranian Voivodeship (north Poland)
- Michałowo, Słupsk County in Pomeranian Voivodeship (north Poland)
- Michałowo, Warmian-Masurian Voivodeship (north Poland)

== See also ==
- Michałów (disambiguation)
