= Grzmiąca, Łódź Voivodeship =

Grzmiąca
- Village
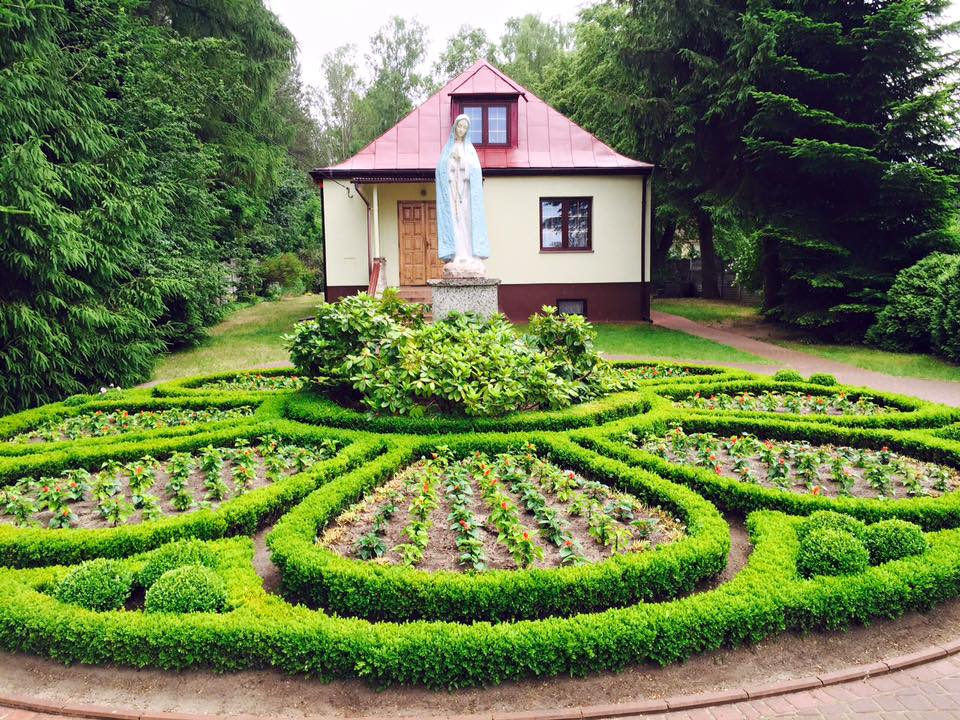

- Location within Poland
- Coordinates: 51°49′37″N 19°42′39″E
- Country: Poland
- Voivodeship: Łódź
- County: Brzeziny
- Gmina: Gmina Brzeziny

Grzmiąca [ˈɡʐmjɔnt͡sa] is a village in the administrative district of Gmina Brzeziny, within Brzeziny County, Łódź Voivodeship, in central Poland.
