= Witkowice, Łódź Voivodeship =

Witkowice
- Village
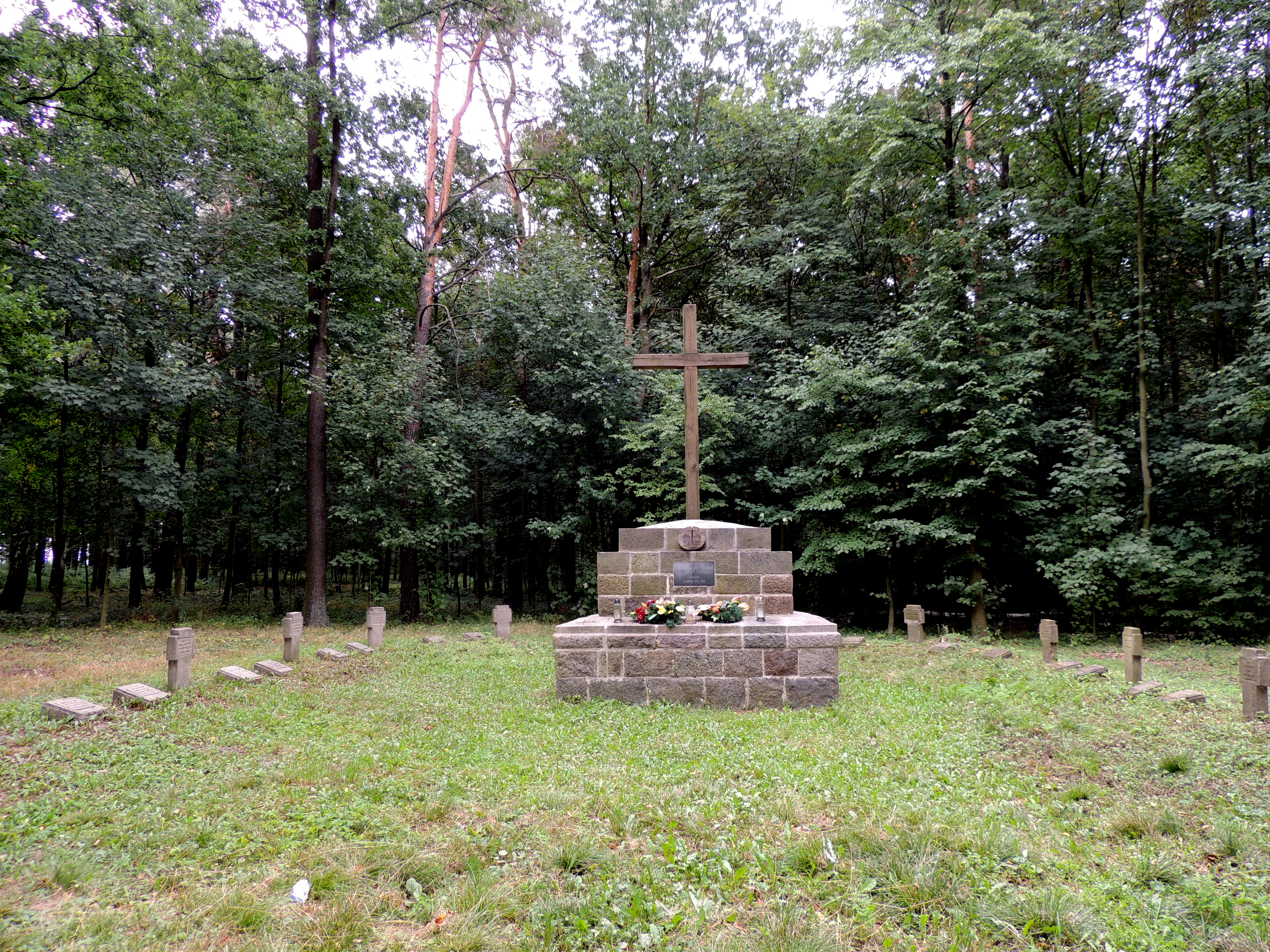
- War cemetery

- Location within Poland
- Coordinates: 51°46′28″N 19°43′52″E
- Country: Poland
- Voivodeship: Łódź
- County: Brzeziny
- Gmina: Gmina Brzeziny
- Population: 280

Witkowice [vitkɔˈvit͡sɛ] is a village in the administrative district of Gmina Brzeziny, within Brzeziny County, Łódź Voivodeship, in central Poland.
