= Rogów, Brzeziny County =

Rogów
- Village
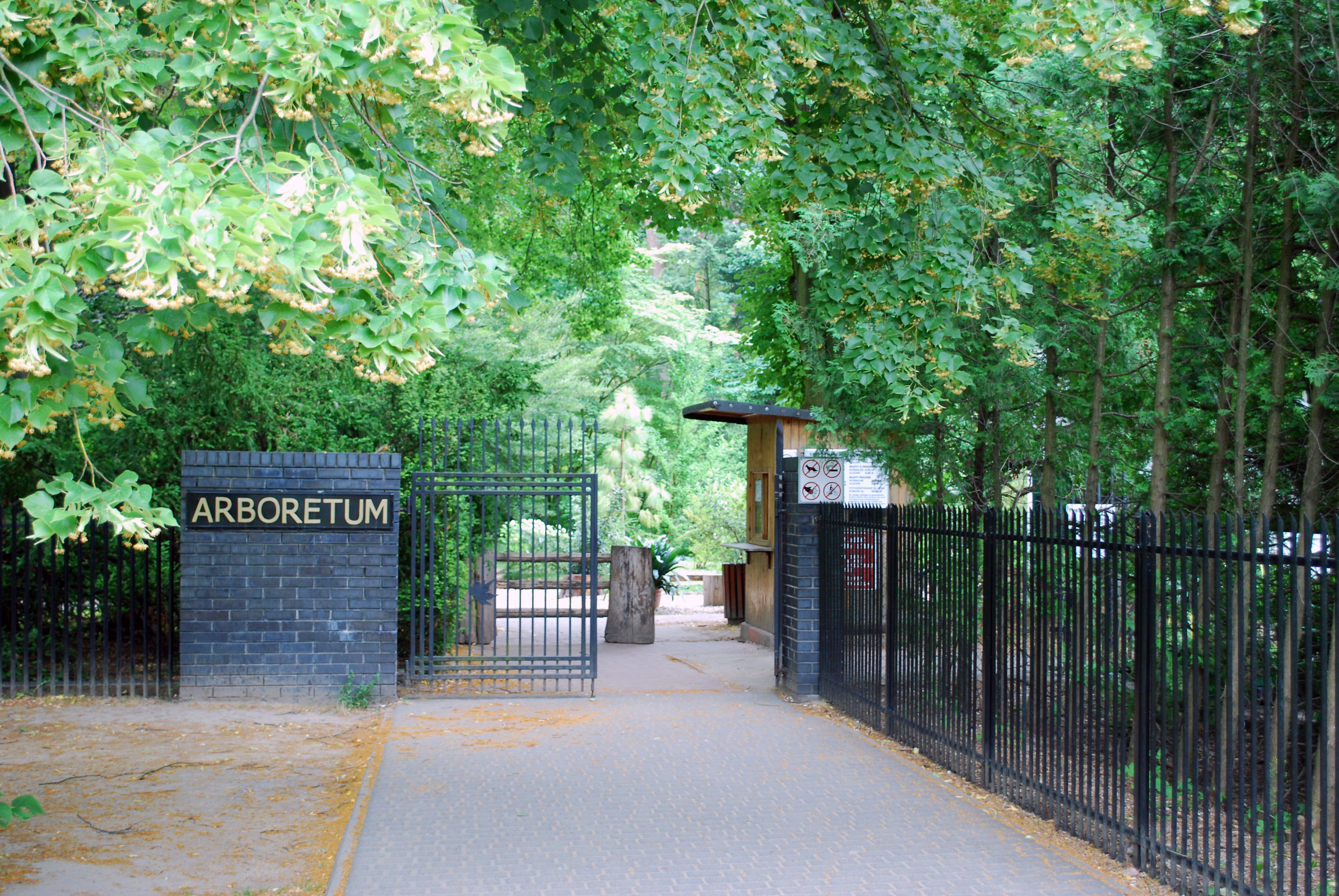
- Arboretum

- Location within Poland
- Coordinates: 51°48′59″N 19°52′47″E
- Country: Poland
- Voivodeship: Łódź
- County: Brzeziny
- Gmina: Rogów
- Population: 1,500
- Website: http://www.rogow.eu

Rogów [ˈrɔɡuf] is a village in Brzeziny County, Łódź Voivodeship, in central Poland. It is the seat of the gmina (administrative district) called Gmina Rogów.
