= Małczew =

- Village
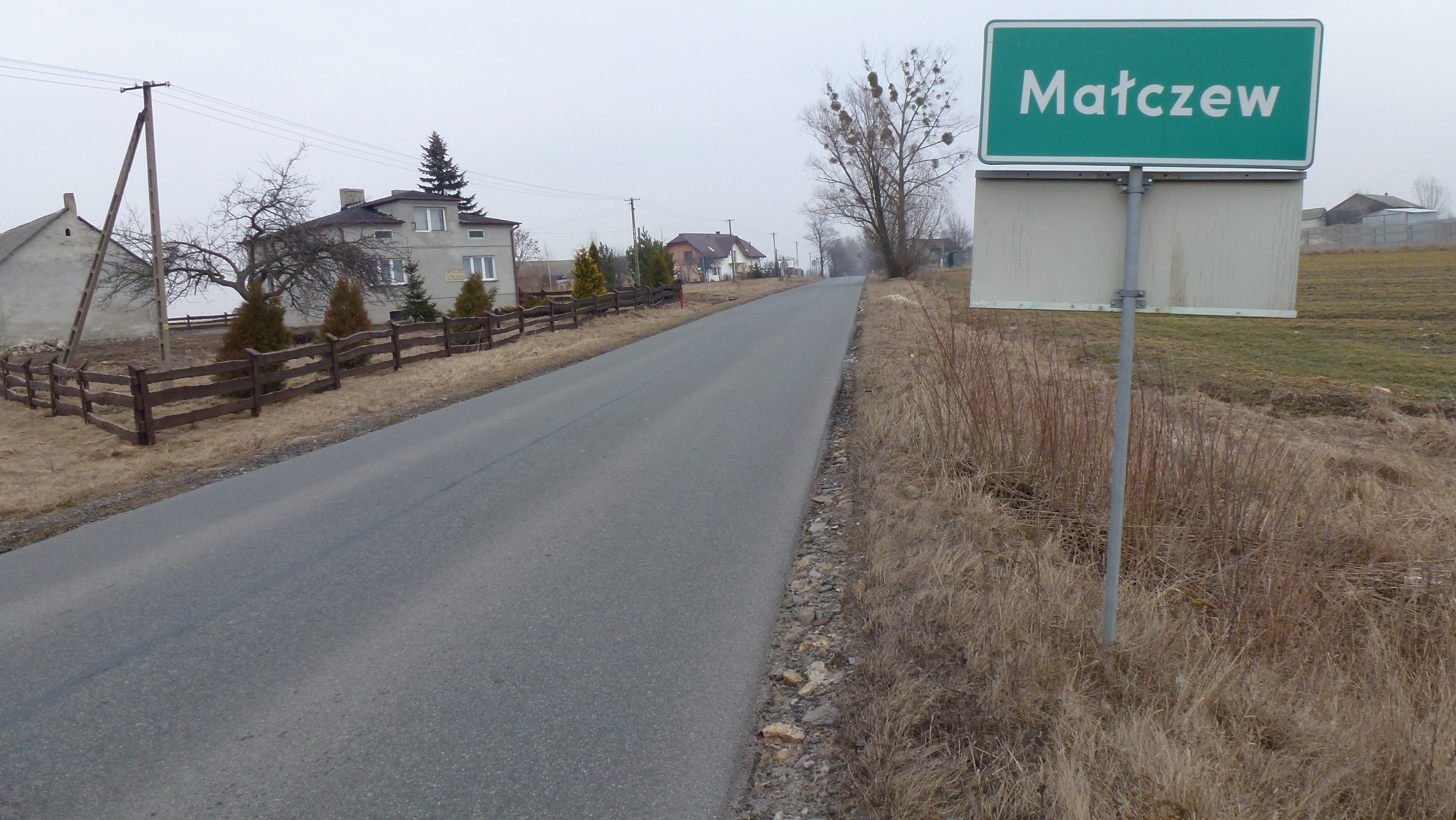

- Location within Poland
- Coordinates: 51°46′39″N 19°41′57″E
- Country: Poland
- Voivodeship: Łódź
- County: Brzeziny
- Gmina: Gmina Brzeziny

Małczew [ˈmau̯t͡ʂɛf] is a village in the administrative district of Gmina Brzeziny, within Brzeziny County, Łódź Voivodeship, in central Poland.
