= Jordanów, Łódź Voivodeship =

Jordanów
- Village
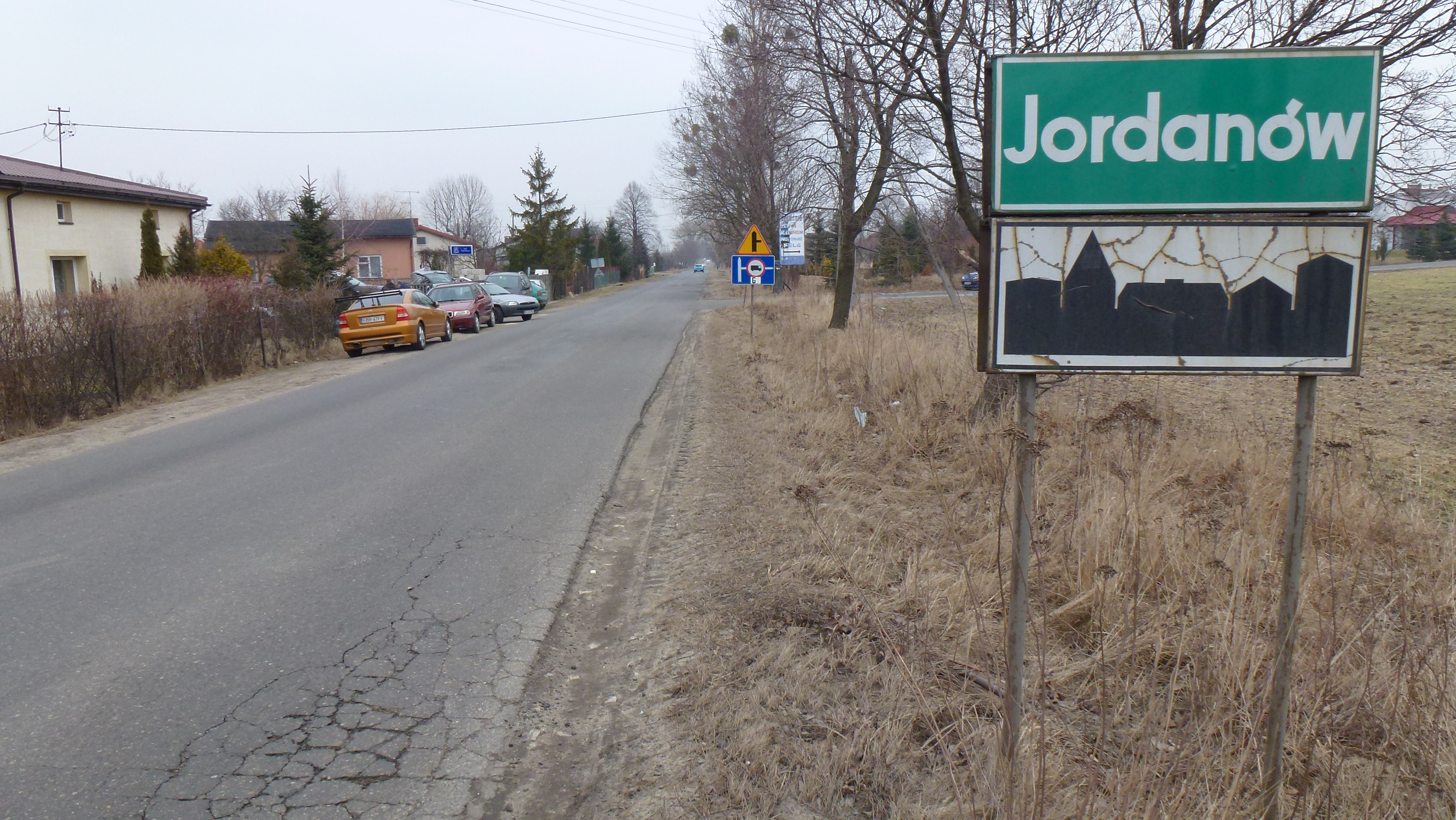

- Location within Poland
- Coordinates: 51°45′16″N 19°40′13″E
- Country: Poland
- Voivodeship: Łódź
- County: Brzeziny
- Gmina: Gmina Brzeziny

Jordanów [jɔrˈdanuf] is a village in the administrative district of Gmina Brzeziny, within Brzeziny County, Łódź Voivodeship, in central Poland.
