= Helenówka, Łódź Voivodeship =

Helenówka
- Village
- Location within Poland
- Coordinates: 51°47′44″N 19°49′29″E
- Country: Poland
- Voivodeship: Łódź
- County: Brzeziny
- Gmina: Gmina Brzeziny
- Population: 30

Helenówka [xɛlɛˈnufka] is a village in the administrative district of Gmina Brzeziny, within Brzeziny County, Łódź Voivodeship, in central Poland.
