= Gmina Rogów =

Gmina Rogów Rogów Commune
- Gmina
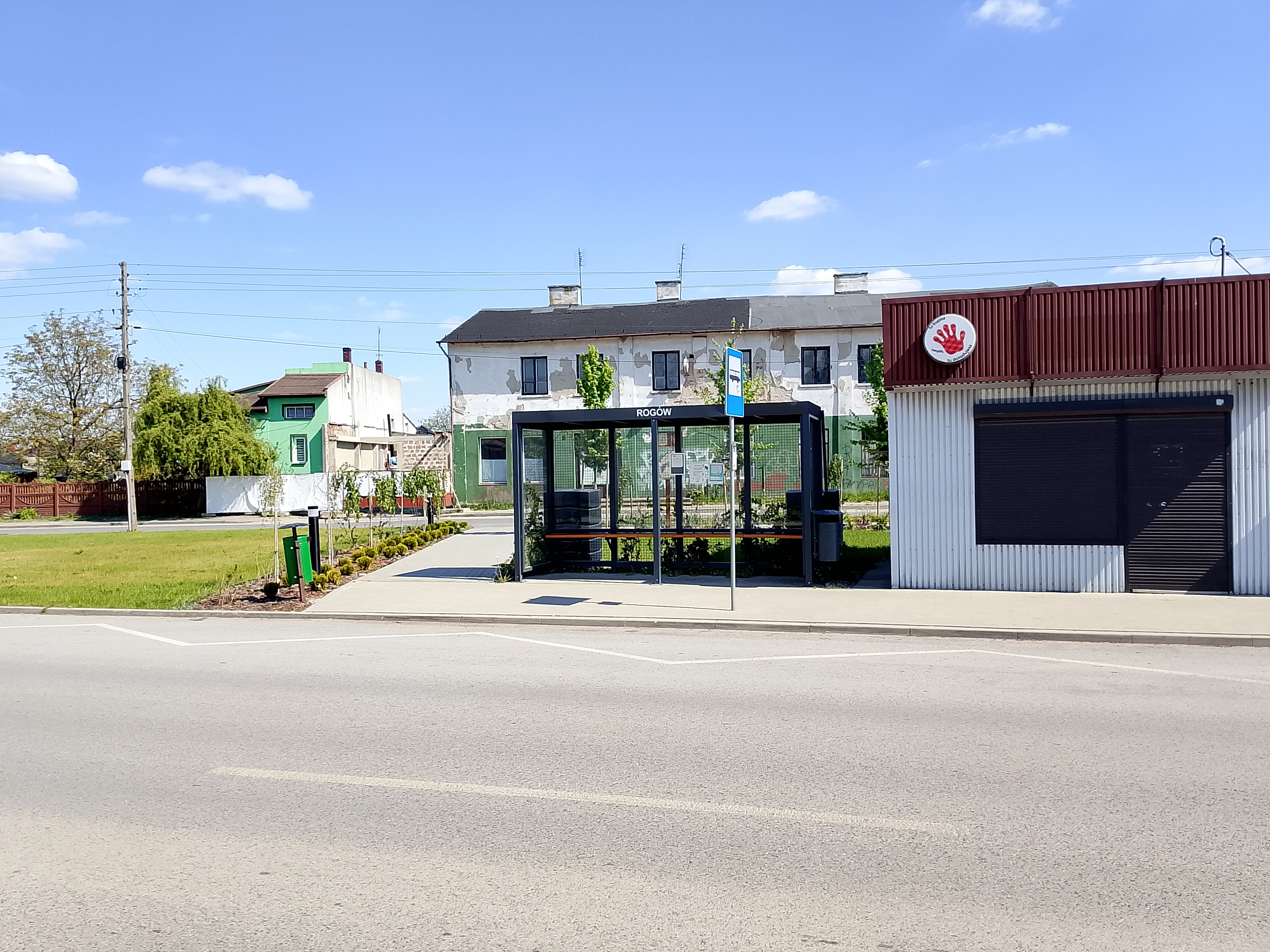

- Coat of arms
- Interactive map of Gmina Rogów
- Coordinates (Rogów): 51°48′59″N 19°52′47″E
- Country: Poland
- Voivodeship: Łódź
- County: Brzeziny
- Seat: Rogów

Area
  - Total: 66.23 km^{2} (25.57 sq mi)

Population (2006)
  - Total: 4,647
  - Density: 70.16/km^{2} (181.7/sq mi)
- Website: www.rogow.eu

Gmina Rogów is a rural gmina (administrative district) in Brzeziny County, Łódź Voivodeship, in central Poland. Its seat is the village of Rogów, which lies approximately 10 kilometres (6 mi) east of Brzeziny and 29 km (18 mi) east of the regional capital Łódź.

The gmina covers an area of 66.23 square kilometres (25.6 sq mi), and as of 2006 its total population is 4,647.

Rogów is home to the ARBORETUM forest botanical garden, which is part of University of Live Science in Warsaw since 1922. Its collection contains 2500 species of trees and schrubs.

== Villages ==
Gmina Rogów contains the villages and settlements of:

- Jasień
- Józefów
- Kobylin
- Kotulin
- Marianów Rogowski
- Mroga Dolna
- Mroga Górna
- Nowe Wągry
- Olsza
- Popień
- Przyłęk Duży
- Przyłęk Mały
- Rogów
- Rogów Wieś
- Stefanów
- Wągry
- Zacywilki

== Neighbouring gminas ==
Gmina Rogów is bordered by the gminas of Brzeziny, Dmosin, Jeżów, Koluszki, Lipce Reymontowskie and Słupia.
