= Dąbrówka Mała, Łódź Voivodeship =

Dąbrówka Mała
- Village
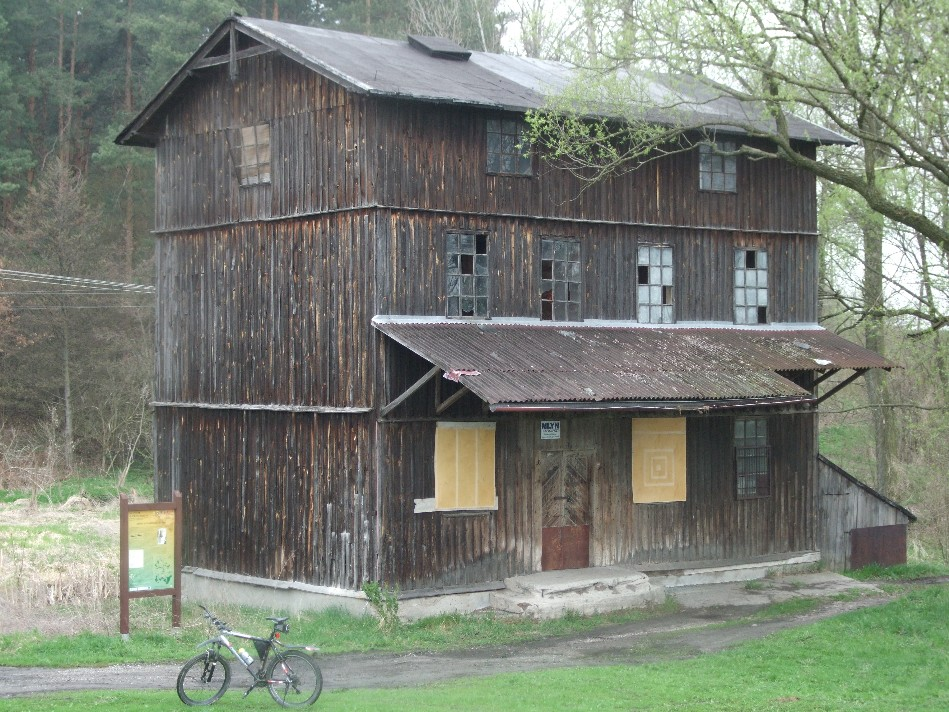

- Location within Poland
- Coordinates: 51°51′10″N 19°44′28″E
- Country: Poland
- Voivodeship: Łódź
- County: Brzeziny
- Gmina: Gmina Brzeziny

Dąbrówka Mała [dɔmˈbrufka ˈmawa] is a village located in the administrative district of Gmina Brzeziny, within Brzeziny County, in the Łódź Voivodeship, in central Poland.
