= Ząbki, Łódź Voivodeship =

Ząbki
- Village
- Location within Poland
- Coordinates: 51°55′38″N 19°48′15″E
- Country: Poland
- Voivodeship: Łódź
- County: Brzeziny
- Gmina: Dmosin

Ząbki [ˈzɔmpki] is a village in the administrative district of Gmina Dmosin, within Brzeziny County, Łódź Voivodeship, in central Poland.
