= Gmina Brzeziny, Łódź Voivodeship =

Gmina Brzeziny Brzeziny Commune
- Gmina
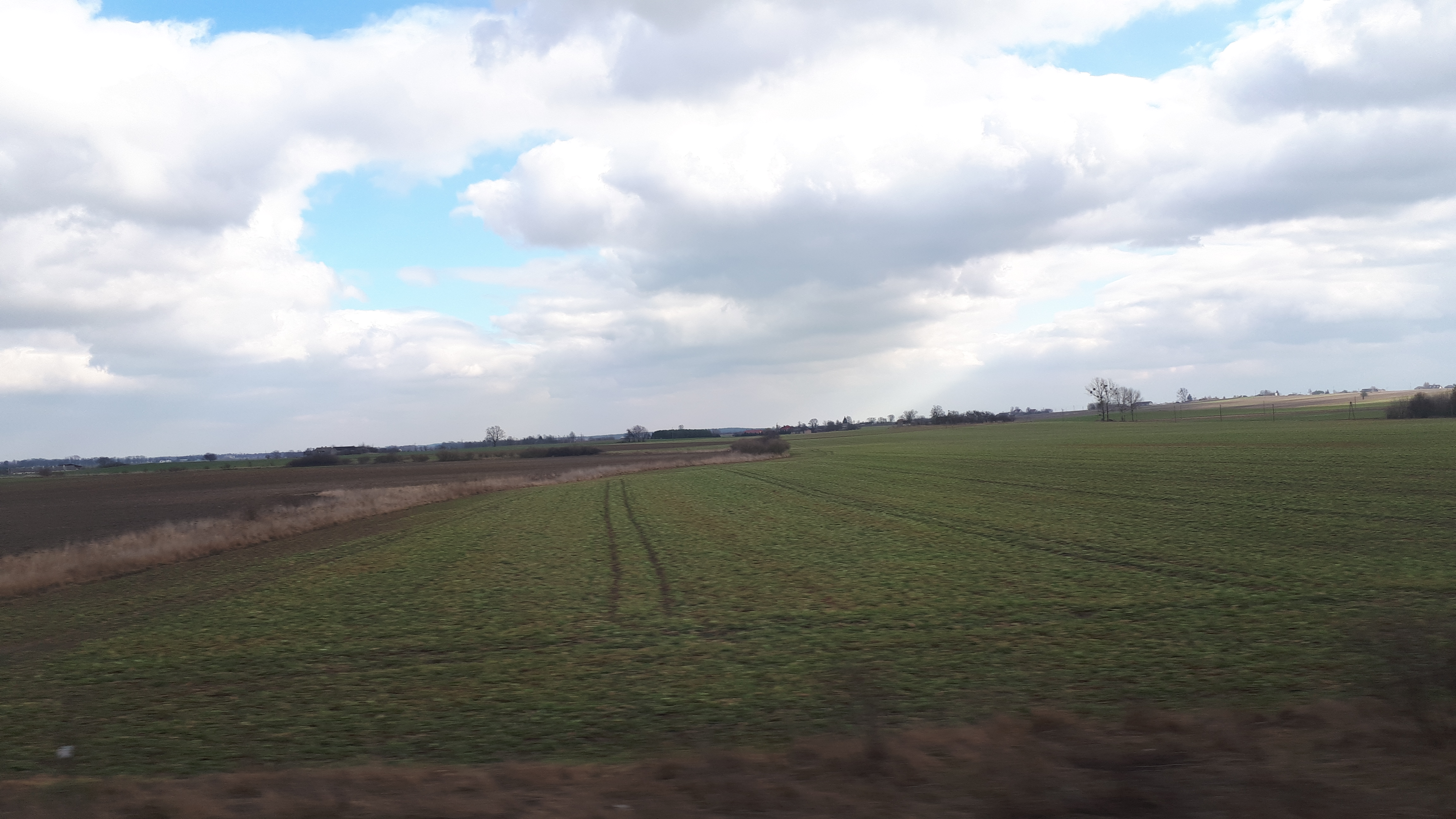

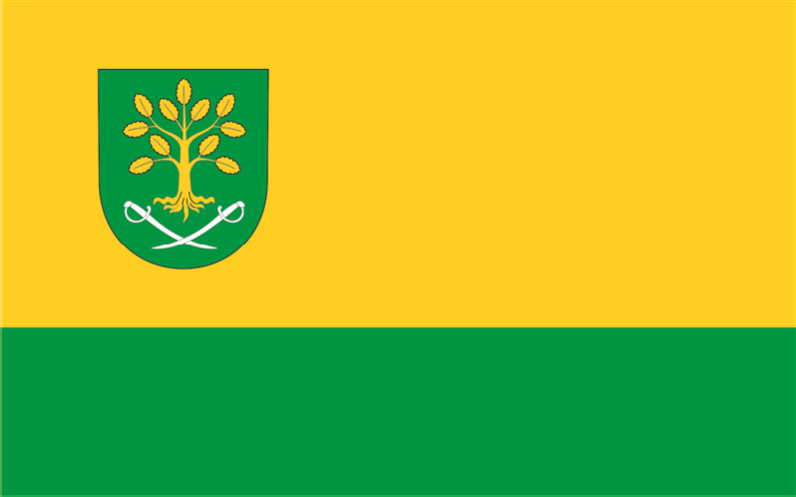
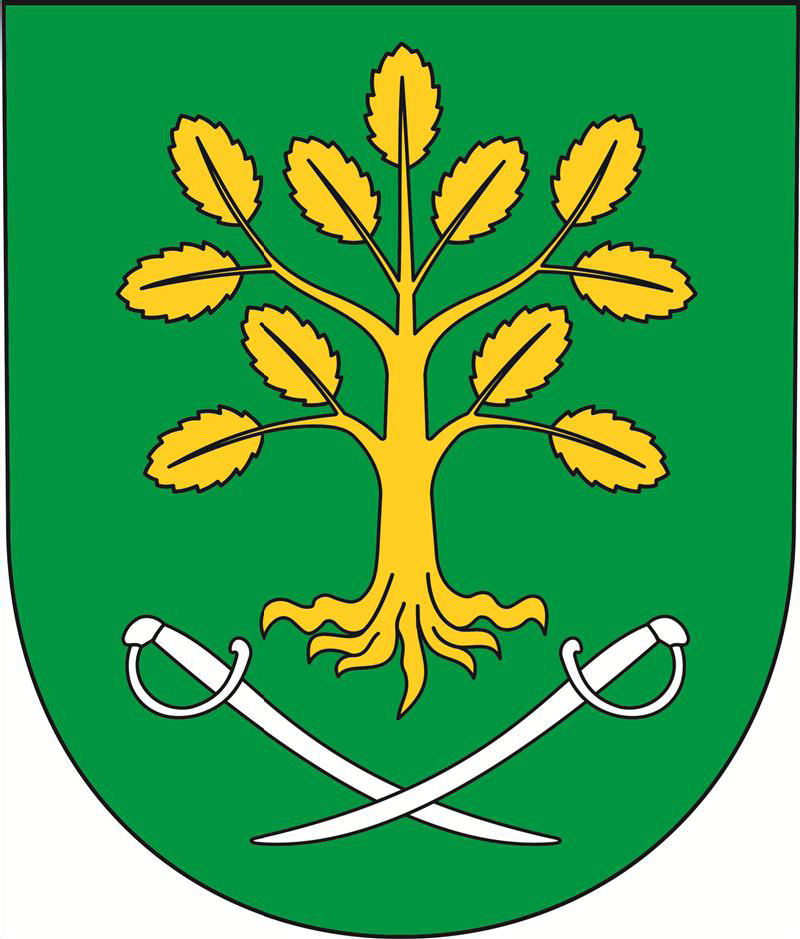
- Flag Coat of arms

- Coordinates (Brzeziny): 51°48′N 19°45′E
- Country: Poland
- Voivodeship: Łódź
- County: Brzeziny
- Seat: Brzeziny

Area
  - Total: 106.37 km^{2} (41.07 sq mi)

Population (2006)
  - Total: 5,276
  - Density: 49.60/km^{2} (128.5/sq mi)
- Website: www.gminabrzeziny.pl

Gmina Brzeziny is a rural gmina (administrative district) in Brzeziny County, Łódź Voivodeship, in central Poland. Its seat is the town of Brzeziny, although the town is not part of the territory of the gmina.

The gmina covers an area of 106.37 square kilometres (41.1 sq mi), and as of 2006 its total population was 5,276.

The gmina contains part of the protected area called Łódź Hills Landscape Park.

== Villages ==
Gmina Brzeziny contains the villages and settlements of:

- Adamów
- Bielanki
- Bogdanka
- Bronowice
- Buczek
- Dąbrówka Duża
- Dąbrówka Mała
- Eufeminów
- Gaj
- Gałkówek-Kolonia
- Grzmiąca
- Helenów
- Helenówka
- Henryków
- Ignaców
- Jabłonów
- Janinów
- Jaroszki
- Jordanów
- Kędziorki
- Małczew
- Marianów Kołacki
- Michałów
- Paprotnia
- Pieńki Henrykowskie
- Poćwiardówka
- Polik
- Przanówka
- Przecław
- Rochna
- Rozworzyn
- Sadowa
- Ściborów
- Stare Koluszki
- Strzemboszowice
- Syberia
- Szymaniszki
- Tadzin
- Teodorów
- Tworzyjanki
- Witkowice
- Żabiniec
- Zalesie

== Neighbouring gminas ==
Gmina Brzeziny is bordered by the town of Brzeziny and by the gminas of Andrespol, Dmosin, Godziesze Wielkie, Koluszki, Nowosolna, Rogów, and Stryków.
