= Michałów, Gmina Dmosin =

Michałów
- Village
- Location within Poland
- Coordinates: 51°55′12″N 19°50′9″E
- Country: Poland
- Voivodeship: Łódź
- County: Brzeziny
- Gmina: Dmosin
- Population: 30

Michałów [miˈxawuf] is a village in the administrative district of Gmina Dmosin, within Brzeziny County, Łódź Voivodeship, in central Poland.
