= Żabiniec, Łódź Voivodeship =

Żabiniec
- Village
- Location within Poland
- Coordinates: 51°51′04″N 19°46′18″E
- Country: Poland
- Voivodeship: Łódź
- County: Brzeziny
- Gmina: Gmina Brzeziny

Żabiniec [ʐaˈbiɲɛt͡s] is a village in the administrative district of Gmina Brzeziny, within Brzeziny County, Łódź Voivodeship, in central Poland.
