= Gmina Dmosin =

Gmina Dmosin Dmosin Commune
- Gmina
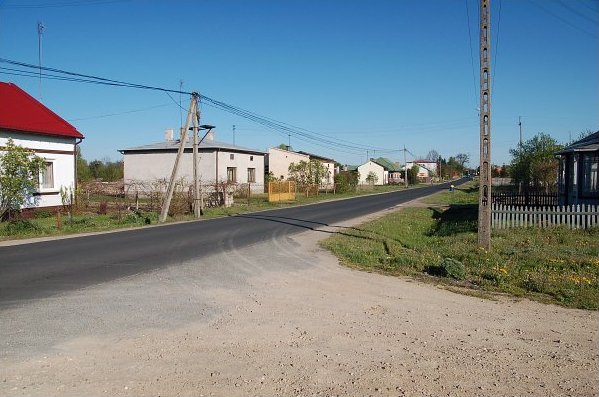

- Flag Coat of arms
- Interactive map of Gmina Dmosin
- Coordinates (Dmosin): 51°55′33″N 19°45′24″E
- Country: Poland
- Voivodeship: Łódź
- County: Brzeziny
- Seat: Dmosin

Area
  - Total: 100.53 km^{2} (38.81 sq mi)

Population (2006)
  - Total: 4,671
  - Density: 46.46/km^{2} (120.3/sq mi)
- Time zone: UTC+1 (CET)
  - Summer (DST): UTC+2 (CEST)
- Website: www.dmosin.bazagmin.pl

Gmina Dmosin is a rural gmina (administrative district) in Brzeziny County, Łódź Voivodeship, in central Poland. Its seat is the village of Dmosin, which lies approximately 14 km (9 mi) north of Brzeziny and 26 km (16 mi) north-east of the regional capital Łódź.

The gmina covers an area of 100.53 km^{2} (38.8 sq mi), and as of 2006 its total population is 4,671.

The gmina contains part of the protected area called Łódź Hills Landscape Park.

== Villages ==
Gmina Dmosin contains the villages and settlements of:

- Borki
- Dąbrowa Mszadelska
- Dmosin
- Dmosin Drugi
- Dmosin Pierwszy
- Grodzisk
- Janów
- Kałęczew
- Kamień
- Kołacin
- Kołacinek
- Koziołki
- Kraszew
- Kraszew Wielki
- Kuźmy
- Lubowidza
- Michałów
- Nadolna
- Nadolna-Kolonia
- Nagawki
- Nowostawy Dolne
- Osiny
- Osiny-Zarębów
- Rozdzielna
- Szczecin
- Teresin
- Wiesiołów
- Wola Cyrusowa
- Wola Cyrusowa-Kolonia
- Ząbki
- Zawady

== Neighbouring gminas ==
Gmina Dmosin is bordered by the gminas of Brzeziny, Głowno, Lipce Reymontowskie, Łyszkowice, Rogów and Stryków.
