= Brzeziny County =

Brzeziny County Powiat brzeziński
- County
- Flag Coat of arms

- Location within the voivodeship

- Division into gminas
- Coordinates (Brzeziny): 51°48′N 19°45′E
- Country: Poland
- Voivodeship: Łódź
- Seat: Brzeziny
- Gminas: Total 5 (incl. 1 urban): Brzeziny; Gmina Brzeziny; Gmina Dmosin; Gmina Jeżów; Gmina Rogów

Area
  - Total: 358.51 km^{2} (138.42 sq mi)

Population (2006)
  - Total: 30,600
  - Density: 85.4/km^{2} (221/sq mi)
  - Urban: 12,373
  - Rural: 18,227
- Car plates: EBR
- Website: www.powiat-brzeziny.pl

Brzeziny County (Polish: powiat brzeziński) is a unit of territorial administration and local government (powiat) in Łódź Voivodeship, central Poland. It was created in 2002 out of the north-eastern part of Łódź East County. Its administrative seat and only town is Brzeziny, which lies 20 kilometres (12 mi) east of the regional capital Łódź.

The county covers an area of 358.51 square kilometres (138.4 sq mi). As of 2006 its total population is 30,600, out of which the population of Brzeziny is 12,373 and the rural population is 18,227.

== Neighbouring counties ==
Brzeziny County is bordered by Łowicz County to the north, Skierniewice County to the east, Tomaszów County to the south-east, Łódź East County to the south and west, and Zgierz County to the north-west.

== Administrative divisions ==
The county is subdivided into five gminas (one urban and four rural). These are listed in the following table, in descending order of population.

Gmina	Type	Area (km^{2})	Population (2006)	Seat
Brzeziny	urban	29.6	12,373	
Gmina Brzeziny	rural	106.4	5,276	Brzeziny *
Gmina Dmosin	rural	100.5	4,671	Dmosin
Gmina Rogów	rural	66.2	4,647	Rogów
Gmina Jeżów	rural	63.8	3,633	Jeżów
* seat not part of the gmina
