= Władysław Oporowski =

Polish medieval political and religious leader

His Excellency Władysław Oporowski
- Archbishop of Gniezno; Primate of Poland
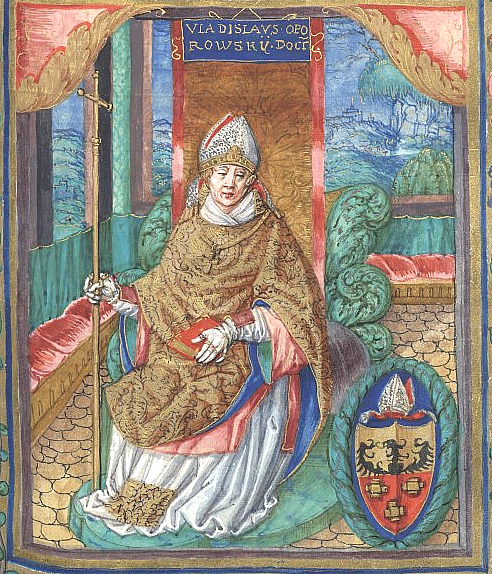
- Church: Roman Catholic
- Archdiocese: Gniezno
- Installed: 1449
- Term ended: 1453

Personal details
- Born: 1395
- Died: 11 March 1453 (aged 57–58) Oporów
- Coat of arms

Władysław Oporowski (1395–1453) was a Polish medieval political and religious leader. Deputy Chancellor of Poland (1429–1434), Bishop of Kujawy (1434–1449), archbishop of Gniezno and primate of Poland (1449–1453). It is recognized that he was a much better diplomat and politician than church official.

== Biography ==
Władysław Oporowski was born in 1395 as the second son of the voivode of Łęczyca, Mikołaj z Oporowa. His family coat of arms was Sulima.

He studied at the University of Padua and worked in the Royal Chancellery. In 1422 together with Mikołaj Kiczka he represented Poland and the Polish king Władysław Jagiełło in the legal proceedings between Poland and the Teutonic Order before the Holy See in Rome. Such diplomatic service for Jagiełlo, and then his son, Casimir IV Jagiellon, gained him political support from the king; he also received numerous prelate and canon positions. In 1426 he lectured as the professor of law at the Cracow Academy.

After the death of archbishop and primate Wincenty Kot, the position was proposed to Zbigniew Oleśnicki, but he refused it. After that, Polish king Casimir IV, whose Oporowski's was a strong supporter of, proposed Oporowski's candidature. The candidature passed, although not without objections from the metropolitan chapter.

Oporowski's reign as the archbishop and primate was rather controversial. Soon after he was elected as archbishop and primate, he ordered that all gifts and nominations given out by his predecessor are to be taken back. He further offended local church officials by refusing to participate in the traditional ingres (welcoming) in the Gniezno Cathedral, and finally accused many of them of corruption and financial misappropriation following primate's Kot's death. One of his chief political opponents was cardinal Zbigniew Oleśnicki, whose nomination to cardinal few years back was vocally opposed by Oporowski.

Oporowski rarely stayed in Gniezno, instead preferring his family seat at Oporów. He was not very interested in the issues of the Gniezno diocese; instead he was focused on improving his own political power and wealth. In Oporów, he oversaw the construction of the Oporów Castle. He died on 11 March 1453 in the Oporów Castle, and was buried in the local church.

== Notes ==
Catholic Church titles
Preceded by Wincenty II Kot	Primate of Poland; Archbishop of Gniezno; 1449–1453	Succeeded by Jan II ze Szprewy
