= Kamienna =

Kamienna is a common geographic name in Poland:

Places:

- Kamienna, Lower Silesian Voivodeship (south-west Poland)
- Kamienna, Kuyavian-Pomeranian Voivodeship (north-central Poland)
- Kamienna, Kutno County in Łódź Voivodeship (central Poland)
- Kamienna, Piotrków County in Łódź Voivodeship (central Poland)
- Kamienna, Świętokrzyskie Voivodeship (south-central Poland)
- Kamienna, Lubusz Voivodeship (west Poland)
- Kamienna, Opole Voivodeship (south-west Poland)
- Kamienna, Pomeranian Voivodeship (north Poland)
- Kamienna, West Pomeranian Voivodeship (north-west Poland)

Rivers:

- Kamienna (river), a tributary to the Vistula
- Kamienna (Bóbr), a tributary to the Bóbr
