= Mnich =

Mnich may refer to:

== Places ==
- Mnich, Silesian Voivodeship, a village in Silesian Voivodeship, south Poland
- Mnich, Kutno County, a village in Łódź Voivodeship, central Poland
- Mnich (mountain), a mountain in Tatra National Park, Poland
- Mnich (Pelhřimov District), a municipality and village in the Vysočina Region, Czech Republic
- Mnich, a village and administrative part of Kardašova Řečice in the South Bohemian Region, Czech Republic

== People ==
- Geneviève Mnich, French actress
