= Oporów Castle =

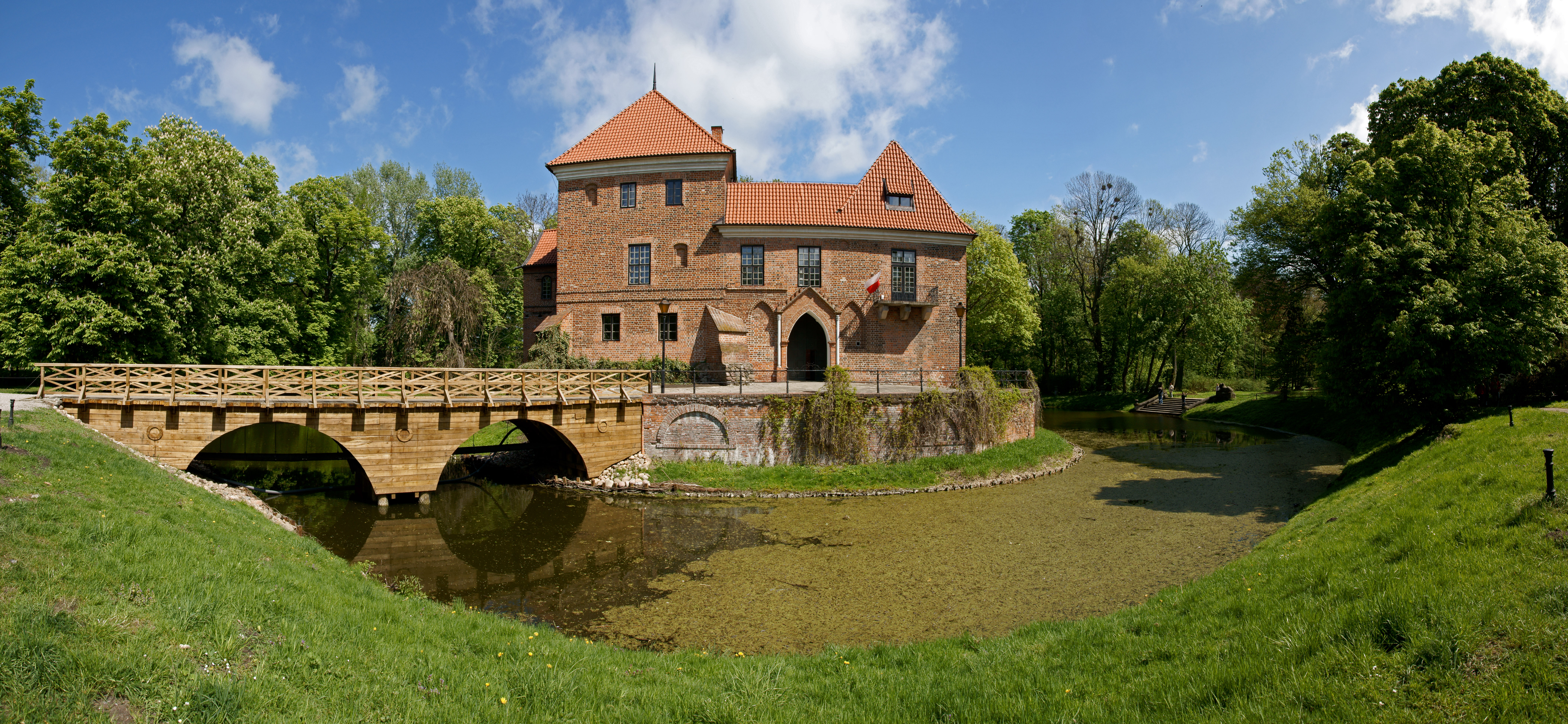
- Oporów Castle

- Location of the Oporów Castle in Poland
- 52°15′45″N 19°33′43″E
- Location: Oporów, Łódź Voivodeship, in Poland

History
- Built: 1434-1449

Site notes
- Architectural style: Gothic

Oporów Castle - a brick castle built in the Gothic architectural style in between 1434 and 1449 in the village of Oporów (15 km north-east of Kutno, Łódź Voivodeship; in Poland. The castle was raised by the Deputy Chancellor of Poland (1429-1434), and highly regarded religious leader Władysław Oporowski.

Formerly the castle was an important centre for the House of Oporowski of the Sulima Coat of Arms.

== History ==
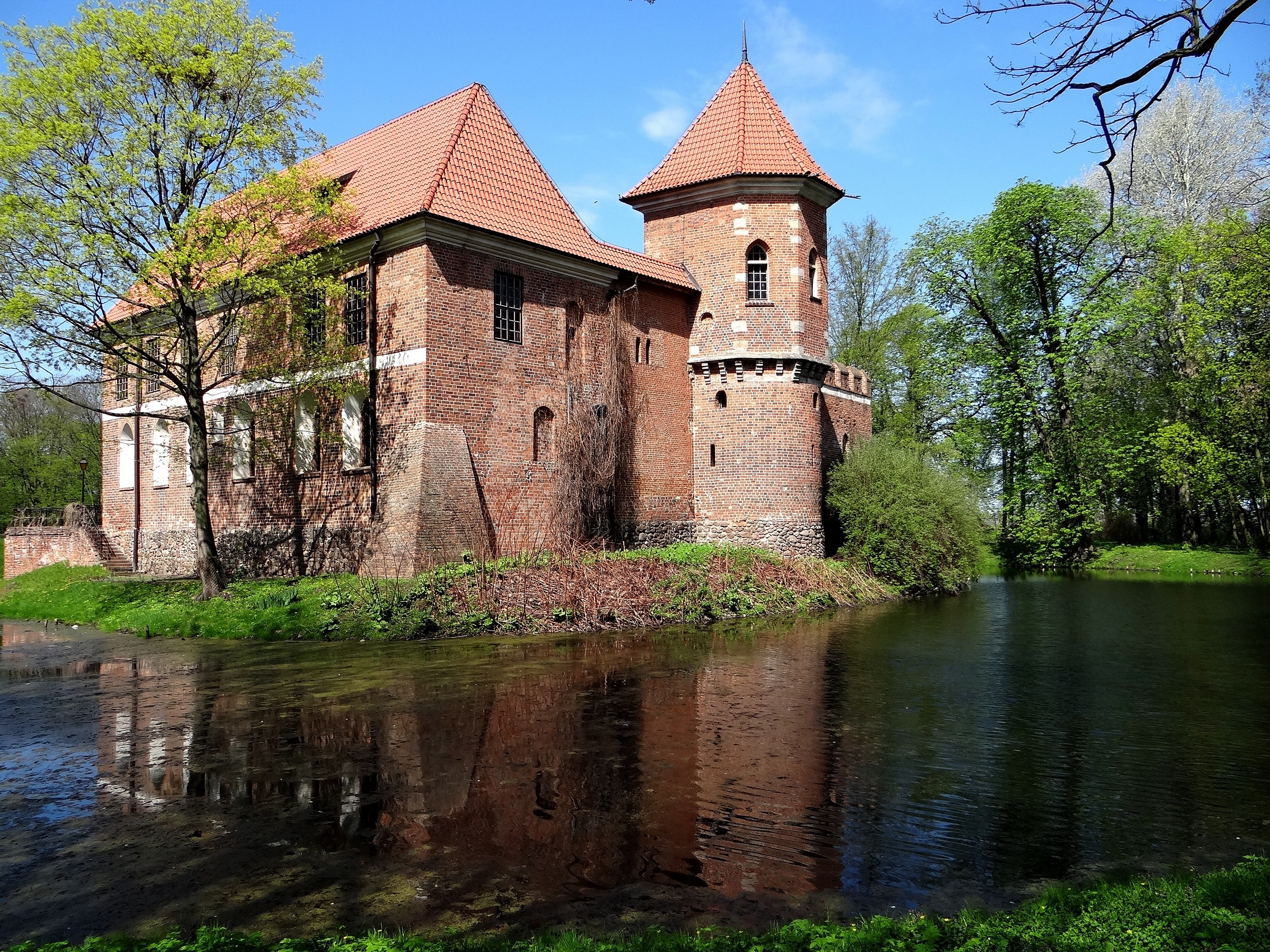
View of the castle from the east

The first wooden stronghold located in Oporów was recorded in the fourteenth century. The castle is said to have been raised by Mikołaj Oporowski and his son Władysław Oporowski, a highly regarded political and religious leader in the Kingdom of Poland, which in 1428 took on the estate as his own. Up until the eighteenth century the castle was owned by several families: House of Sołołobów, Korzeniowski, Pociejów and Oborski. The residence had only once ever been hit by any sort of devastation - in 1657 the castle's top levels caught fire - however, all of the castle was reconstructed. In 1930 the castle was transferred to the Society of the Credit of Land in Warsaw (Polish: Towarzystwo Kredytowe Ziemskie w Warszawie). After World War II the castle was nationalised and reconstructed. In 1949 the castle began housing a museum.
