= Sulima coat of arms =

Polish coat of arms

Sulima
- Battle cry: Sulima
- Alternative names: Oporów, Sulimita
- Earliest mention: 1352 (seal), 1397 (record)
- Divisions: Gmina Oporów (former city)
- Families: 279 names A Ankudowicz, Arczyński. B Bahłaj, Barzykowski, Baytel, Beutel, Białopiotrowicz, Bielecki, Bodywił, Borkowski, Botwit, Bratkowski, Bratoszewski, Broszniowski, Brzośniewski, Buchler, Budwił, Budwiłło, Budzisławski. C Cellari, Chabinowski, Charabinowski, Charbinowski, Charbowski, Chawłowski, Chociowski, Chodowski, Chrzczonowski, Ciołek. Czarnokruk, Czarny. D Daniłowicz, Dawilowicz, Dawiłowicz, Dejm, Dejma, Deym, Dziedziłowski, Dzierzański, Dzierżański, Dzierżeński, Dzierżyński. F Fabisiewicz, Farurej. G Gajewski, Gajowski, Gamrat, Garbatowski, Garbolewski, Garbowski, Gern, Gocłowski, Godwadowski, Gomulicki, Gosłubski, Goślubski, Gottowt, Gotund, Gotundowicz, Gotuntowicz, Gralewski, Grocholiński, Grocholski, Grodź, Gryżewski. H Hajewski, Hamszej, Hamulecki, Henszel, Herbatowski, Holstein, Horbatowski, Horbowski, Hrycałowicz, Hryszkiewicz. J Jacewicz, Jacimierski, Jacimirski, Jackiewicz, Jacuński, Jacymierski, Jacymirski, Jaroszewski, Jaryczewski, Jaryczowski, Jaśkiewicz, Jelski. K Kaliński, Kamiński, Kielecki, Kiernoski, Kiernowski, Kilarski, Kilewski, Kiliński, Kniażyński, Kniehinicki, Knihynicki, Konoplicki, Konrad, Konrade, Korendowicz, Korzeniowski, Kot, Kropiński, Krzyżanowski, Kuklinowski, Kurek, Kurzyna. L Latalski, Leski, Leszczyński, Liczkowski, Lipstowski. Ł Łagiewnicki, Ławecki, Łazarew, Łyczko, Łyczkowski. M Małgowski, Małowidzki, Margiewicz, Mazowita, Mentoński, Mentowski, Miedzianowski, Miloński, Miluński, Miłobęcki, Miłobędzki, Miłoński, Miłowski, Mordwin, Mormuzowski. N Niementowski, Niemętowski, Niemiętowski, Niewiardowski, Nowowiejski. O Obidowski, Ogrodzieński, Ogrodziński, Oporowski, Opporowski, Opulski, Oziembłowski, Oziębłowski. P Paszkiewicz, Pawłowski, Pągowski, Pęgowski, Pieczymucha, Piepol, Pipa, Pleszewski, Pleszowski, Popiel, Przeborowski, Przejuski, Przejuszyn, Przeuski, Przyborowski, Przybyłowicz, Przygodziński, Przygodzki, Przyłoski, Przyłucki, Przyłuski. R Radomski, Radwiłłowicz, Radwiłowicz, Radziwiłłowicz, Radziwiłowicz, Radziwonowicz, Radzwiłowicz, Rodywił, Rogaczewski, Rokoszek, Romka, Roski, Rowski, Rożecki, Rożycki, Rybieński, Rybiński, Ryczgorski, Rymidowicz. S Salcewicz, Samojło, Samojłowicz, Samujło, Saulewicz, Saulski, Sawicz, Skarbek, Służewski, Służowski, Smolko, Smołka, Srobski, Stanisławski, Stankiewicz, Stawiński, Strawiński, Stromski, Strumski, Strzeż, Suligowski - Sulikowski, Sulima, Sulisławski, Sulkowski, Sułkowski, Swichowski, Szajewski, Szajowski, Szalewicz, Szalowski, Szałowski, Szantyc, Szantyr, Szawirski, Szawlewicz, Szawłejko, Szawłowicz, Szawłowski, Szklarzewski, Szochroder, Szpakowicz, Szpakowski, Szredok, Szrobski, Szropski, Szrzobski, Szulakowski, Szulczewski, Szumlewicz, Szwaranowicz, Szwaroniewicz, Szymkajło. Ś Świechowski, Świętochowski. T Trublajewicz, Trzciński, Tumiłowicz, Twaranowicz, Tychonowicz. U Ulanowicz, Ulanowski, Ullanowicz, Ułanowicz, Ułanowski, Ussakowski, Uziembło, Uziębło. W Wąsowicz, Wierszowt, Włodek, Włodkowicz, Wojanowski, Wolski, Wysocki. Z Zabłocki, Zabokrzecki, Zabokrzycki, Zadarnowski, Zadernowski, Zalajewicz, Zaleński, Zaleski, Załęski, Zassowski, Zawidzki, Zawisza, Zemęcki, Ziemecki, Ziemiecki, Ziemięcki, Zylajewicz. Ż Żabokrzecki, Żabokrzycki.

Sulima is a Polish coat of arms. It was used by several noble families in the Kingdom of Poland and the Polish–Lithuanian Commonwealth. Notable people using the symbol were Zawisza Czarny—a famous Polish knight—and the Sułkowski family.

== Etymology ==
According to Maria Kowalska Bobowski, the term comes from the personal name Sulima, or Sulim. From 1394, the latter term was present in the sources Sulima with erysipelas, undoubtedly a member of this family.

Wladyslaw Semkowicz derived the name of Sulima from the village of nest Sulimów in Wielkopolska Sulina, under Kleck in the district of Gniezno, parish Dębnica. Another village with a similar name, Sulimów (now Sulmów), was in the district of Sieradz, parish Goszczanów. It was recorded in written records until 1391. From Łęczyca, goods of different families of the arms known from a later period. From about 30 km in a straight line to Sieradz Ostrowska near Uniejów, the village associated with Sulimami already in 13th in.

Another theory suggests that Sulima derived from the family name Sulimów, or the kind of medieval polearms known as sulicy.

== Description ==
The coat of arms consists of a shield split horizontally into two regions that are red and yellow. The bottom region is usually depicted as red, or blue in some cases, with three white stones and crosses adorning it. The top region is depicted as yellow—sometimes described as gold—or less commonly white—sometimes described as silver—adorned with the top half of a right-facing (Note: By the rules of blazon, the sides of a coat of arms are described from the point of view of a bearer of the shield: the left side for an observer is a right side of the knight and of his coat of arms. Compare Dexter and sinister.) eagle with its wings pointing outwards. More ornate depictions of the coat of arms include various mantling, including a helmet on top of the shield with an additional eagle on the helmet.

Variations used by individual families may change the color scheme, use a different eagle, or otherwise incorporate the entire design as part of a larger coat of arms.

== History ==
The earliest recorded uses of the Sulima coat of arms are found on three wax seals attached to documents from c. 1352 – c. 1360. One of them was owned by the curator of the collegiate church of St. Michael's Castle, Francis. In its initial form, the coat of arms consisted of only the undivided shield, but its colors remain unknown.

Among several images of the seal from the 14th century, the seal of Stanisław Gamrat from Klimontów impressed under the act of Union of Horodło in 1413.

Around the same time, Zawisza Czarny used Sulima. Fighting with the Turks and performing various missions at the side of king Sigismund, he colored the eagle black in his coat of arms (a cognomen Czarny means "black" in Polish). Associated with the figure of Zawisza is also the first colored version of Sulima. It ended up in St. Christopher's Fraternal Book on Arlberg in Tyrol (pol. Księga bracka św. Krzysztofa na Arlbergu w Tyrolu) as a donation to the fraternity for caring for travelers crossing the Alps. The arms of the eagle, the top field, and an added girdle on the eagle were silver. The bottom field was red with golden stones, with an arrangement of two stones, then one. Presumably, the Western illustrator was inspired by the eagles of Silesia (girdle and color), Germany (color) and Poland (color of the field).

In the 15th century, appearances of Sulima were featured in three Western rolls of arms. Among them is the Burgundian Armorial Toison d'Or by Jean Le Fèvre de Saint-Remy from around 1435. Armorial repeats the color scheme of Fraternal Book, but the upper field is thinner, coming closer to a third of the shield instead of the usual half. That version lacks any jewels, nor does it have any mantling. Two other Western armorials, Codex Bergshammar and Armorial Lycenich from the 1420s–1430s, scaled down the top field.

At the same time in Poland, images of Sulima already had a clear division between two fields. The seals of Władysław from Oporów and bishop of Wrocław demonstrated this design from 1435 to 1441. Similar patterns were also preserved at the castle in Oporów.

The decoration of the reliquary of St. Barbara from the years 1484–1493 has decorative fringes; the emblem is red, and the field is gold.

Subsequent elements of the full coat of arms next to labrów and jewel, appeared on the bell of the Dmosin. Dating back to 1,500 years, the foundation of a family member Oporowski occurred. This is the first presentation of Sulima Labrami and the jewel in Poland. Additionally, the helmet had a crown.

The first performance Sulima with a gold top field comes from the portrait of Peter Gamrat from the years 1541–1545. However, the top field is more like a head. Division two-pole and gold upper field shows while so-called Herbal Arsenalski from about 1535–1555. In addition, the stones are all silver. Although the silver tincture upper field appears in the 16th century, the tincture of gold became present in more coat of arms. Much of the merits of a new compendium of heraldic from 1584—Herby rycerstwa polskiego by Bartosz Paprocki. It shows the image of the coat of arms full, but does not identify the color of stones. In addition, due to an engraver's error, the eagle jewel and emblem is facing to the left, which was later replicated.

This coat of arms is found on several gothic tombstones, among others in Gniezno and Koło, as an architectural detail in several churches and in a castle in Oporów near Kutno, as well as a symbol of the founders of the various ecclesiastical jewels, precious chalices, and books.

The decline of the 14th century had the first written mention of Sulima. In 1397, the name of the family and the coat of arms appeared in court records Łęczyca voivodeship (record de cleynodio Sulima). In that same year, it mensions of a kindred Sulimów in court records Konin. Since then, it was translated in various writings heraldic, sometimes with a terse description of the coat of arms in Latin or Polish, for example, Pol Horla and trzi kamene (1423), eagle with three stones (1568), or three stones s pools eagle v black box (1580).

Sulima was also the first Polish armorial Gem attributed to Jan Długosz during the 1460s. Dlugosz describes the coat of arms without the distribution of the field. It is possible that it was omitted from this description, or based on older depictions.

The earliest mention of proklamie, another name for the coat of arms, comes from 1424.

The black eagle was a symbol of strength and the emblem of the Roman emperors as well as the Germans.

According to legend, given by Leopold von Ledebur progenitor, Sulimitów was added to the coat of arms of three precious stones to show the community of blood with his two brothers, from whom he had to distinguish by name and emblem.

Jan Dlugosz hypothesized, repeated later by other heralds (Paprocki, Bielski, Okolski, Niesiecki), that Sulimczycy were knights migrated from Germany. This would testify about the black eagle, allegedly referring to the heraldry of kings and emperors of the Reich. Niesiecki even gives an example of Prussian family Slomff that in one of the fields, the czterodzielnego coat of arms had half a black eagle and writes about them as relatives to Sulimczyków. Criterion imino clearly shows that the names of the earliest mentioned Sulimitów were purely Polish (e.g. Strzeszko, Budzisław, Wierzchosław).

Some of the common names there are for families of assumed to coat the road adoption. The first (not counting Rodywiła) documented an adopted (year 1506) was a councilor Jan Baytel (Beutel) of Toruń. In 1522, Sulimitą became Stanislaw Vitreator (Glazier - Szklarzewski), while four years later, Fedor Dawiłowicz of Vitsyebsk, children, and brothers—Saul Emanuel and Jerzy Zylajewiczami. They were adopted by Peter and John Służewski Gamrat. With the adoption came a coat of Felix of Trynczy in 1540, and it made the gem varieties (see variant versions aristocratic and alternative representations of the coat of arms). New Sulimitów admitted to the family until the end of the First Republic. Anthony, Christopher, and Valentine Deymów were knighted and given Sulima in 1768, George Trublajewicza a year later, and Melchior, Gaspar, and John Szajowskich (Szajewskich) in 1776.

Several families of foreign origin used Sulima, including Tatar and Armenian.

Stanislaw Dziadulewicz lists Tartar origin family kniaziowską Ułanowiczów (who have come from Jasiek Kazkowicza, an older line of princes Kryczyńskich; name comes from the village Ułanowicze taken in the period 1640–1650 Adam). He mentioned that in 1819, Ignatius Ułanowicz Sulima (who wrote the Ullanowicz and using the nickname "on Solms") filed an application to the Senate of the Polish Kingdom to grant him the title of earl because of his father in various transactions, the official took the title and that was registered even in metric as Count. The Commission of the Senate in 1824 recognized the evidence and awarded it. The Zablocki family name is of Tatar origin, and lists the service Tartars Polish.

Louis Corvinus, of Armenian origin, was supposed to be part of the Jaśkiewiczów family. With this family were to be among others: Jan, court physician of King Stanisław August Poniatowski, Jagiellonian University professor; Joseph, the judge rights of Armenian in Lviv 1765, king's secretary; Gabriel and Francis Xavier, secretaries of the king.

Published in 1855, a book of Russian heraldry Alexander Borisovich varnish "Heraldry Russian". The author cites the names there of the Russian nobility, which took over some of the Polish coat of arms. Among them is Sulima. The paint does not explain how such a takeover occurred. What is certain is that few Polish families settled in Russia. Native Russian families could receive the Polish coats of arms on the principle of assimilation images of their own. Sulima had the varnish to seal the family: Bantysz-Kamienski, Guriew and Sabłukow (of unspecified variety). Herb Sulima, one of the 271 Polish nobility coats of arms, has been absorbed by the Russian heraldry.

== Origin and occurrence coat ==
=== The earliest mention of evolution and the image of the coat of arms ===
Performances coat of arms Sulima over the centuries
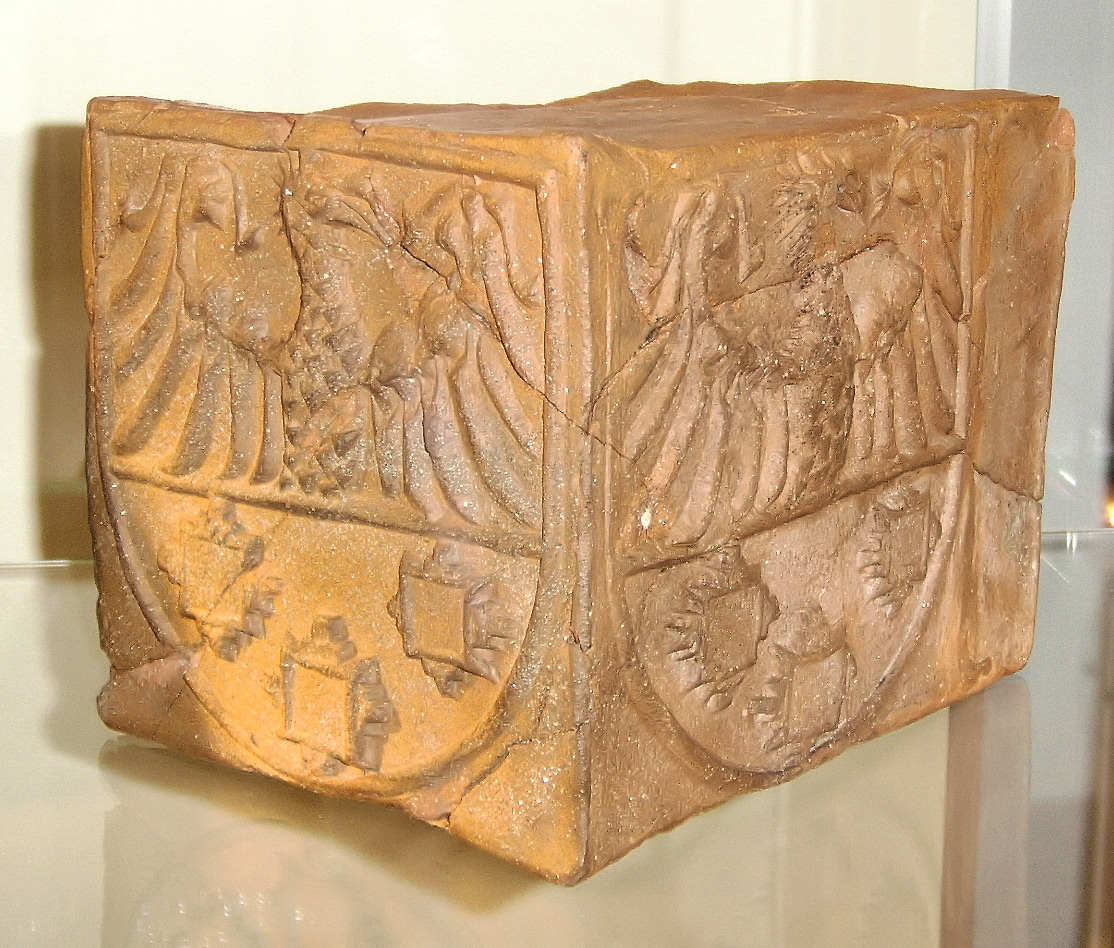
Tiles Corner Sulima coat of arms of the fifteenth century.

Fifteenth-century version Sulima - modern reconstruction

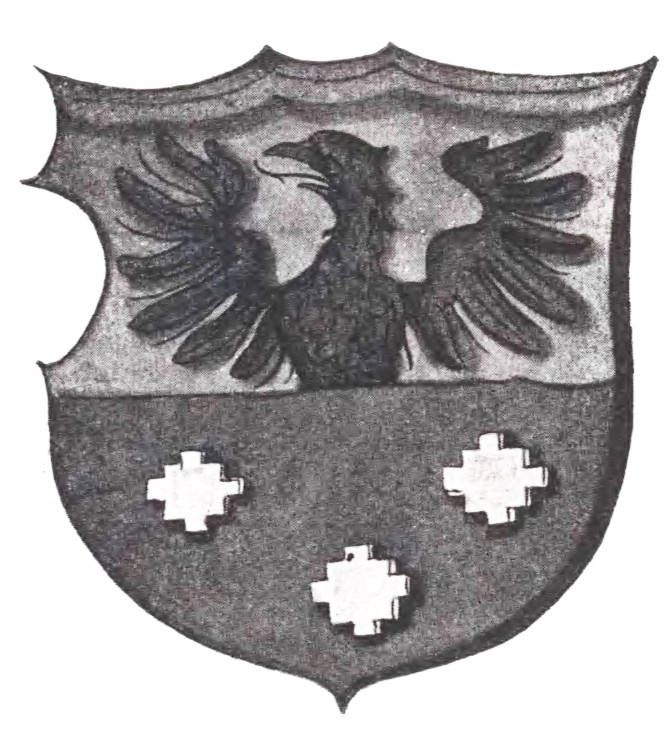
Herb Sulima in Armorial Stemmata Polonica with approx. 1540

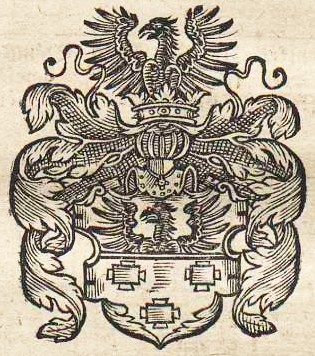
Herb Sulima of 'Jacks virtues ..' 'B. Paprocki of 1578

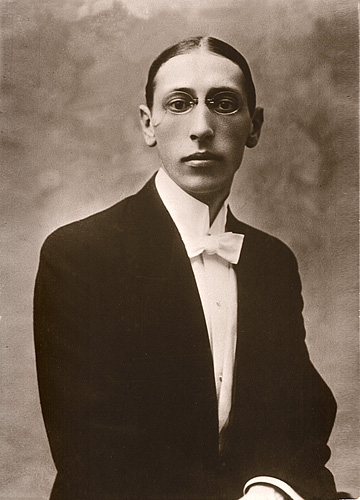
Igor Stravinsky, Herb Sulima

== Notable bearers ==
- Zawisza Czarny
- Władysław Oporowski
- Igor Stravinsky
- Piotr Gamrat
- Popiel family
- Sułkowski family
- Radomski family
- Felix Dzerzhinsky

== Gallery ==
Coat of arms of Family Seeguth-Stanisławski, 17th century

Coat of arms of Counts Seeguth-Stanisławski

Coat of arms of Sułkowski, 1732

Coat of arms of Princes Sułkowski, 1752

Coat of arms of Princes Sułkowski, 1752

Coat of arms of Sulima, 1540.

Coat of arms of Primate Władysław Oporowski

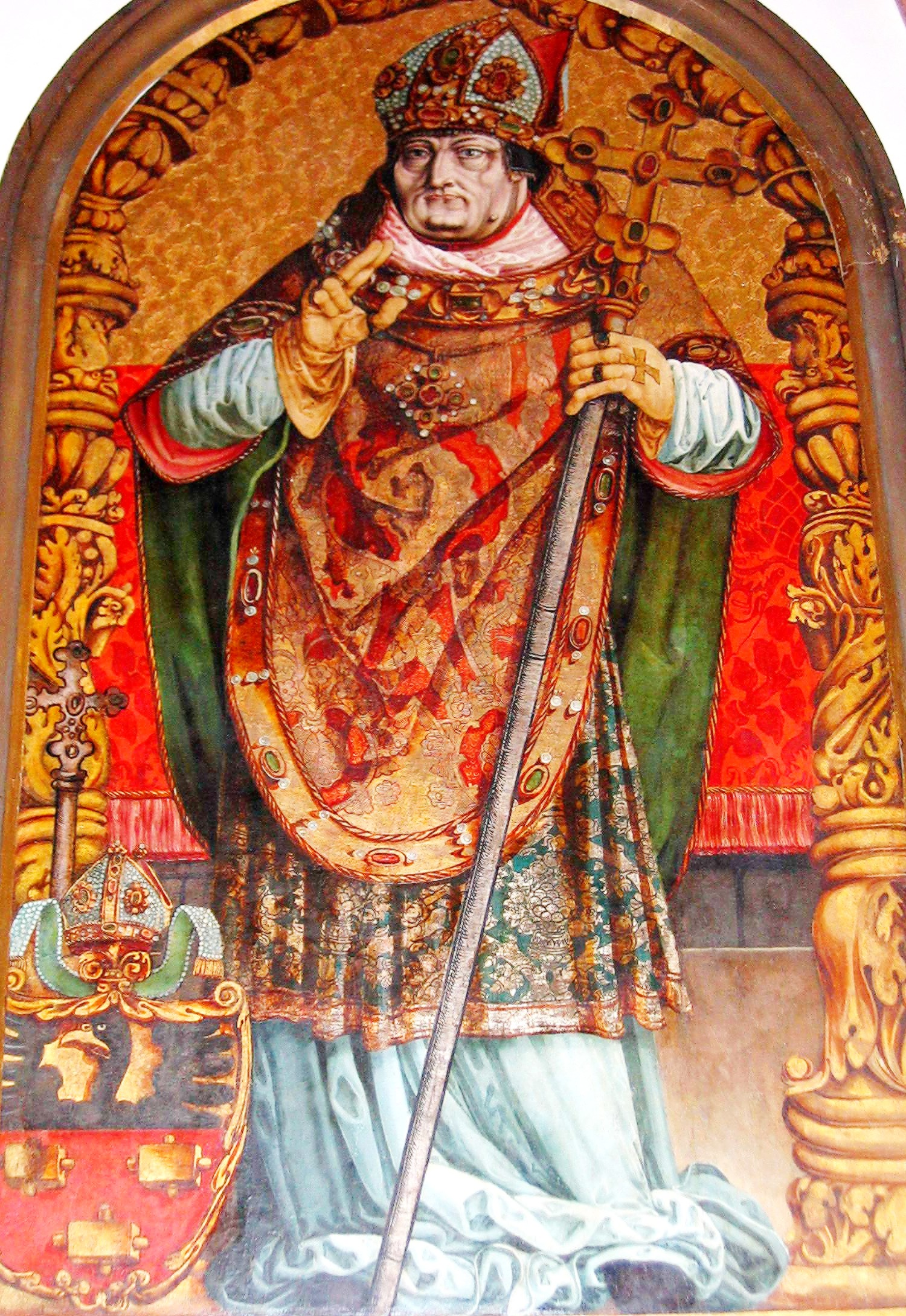
Sulima on the painting of Piotr Gamrat

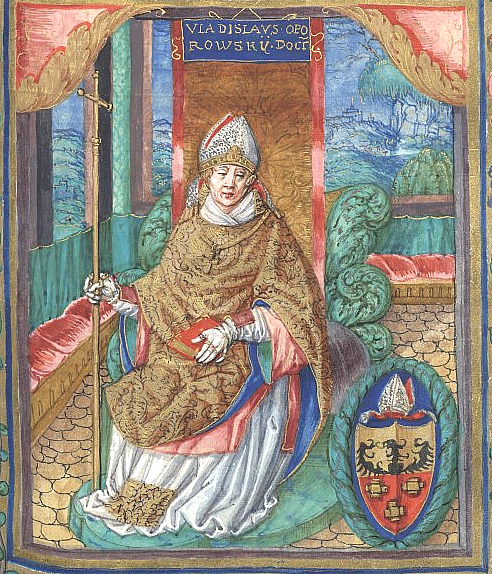
Sulima on the painting of Władysław Oporowski

== See also ==
- Polish heraldry
- Heraldry
- Coat of arms
