= Zbigniew Oleśnicki (cardinal) =

Polish Catholic cardinal, statesman, and diplomat (1389–1455)

His Eminence Zbigniew Oleśnicki
- Cardinal Archbishop of Kraków
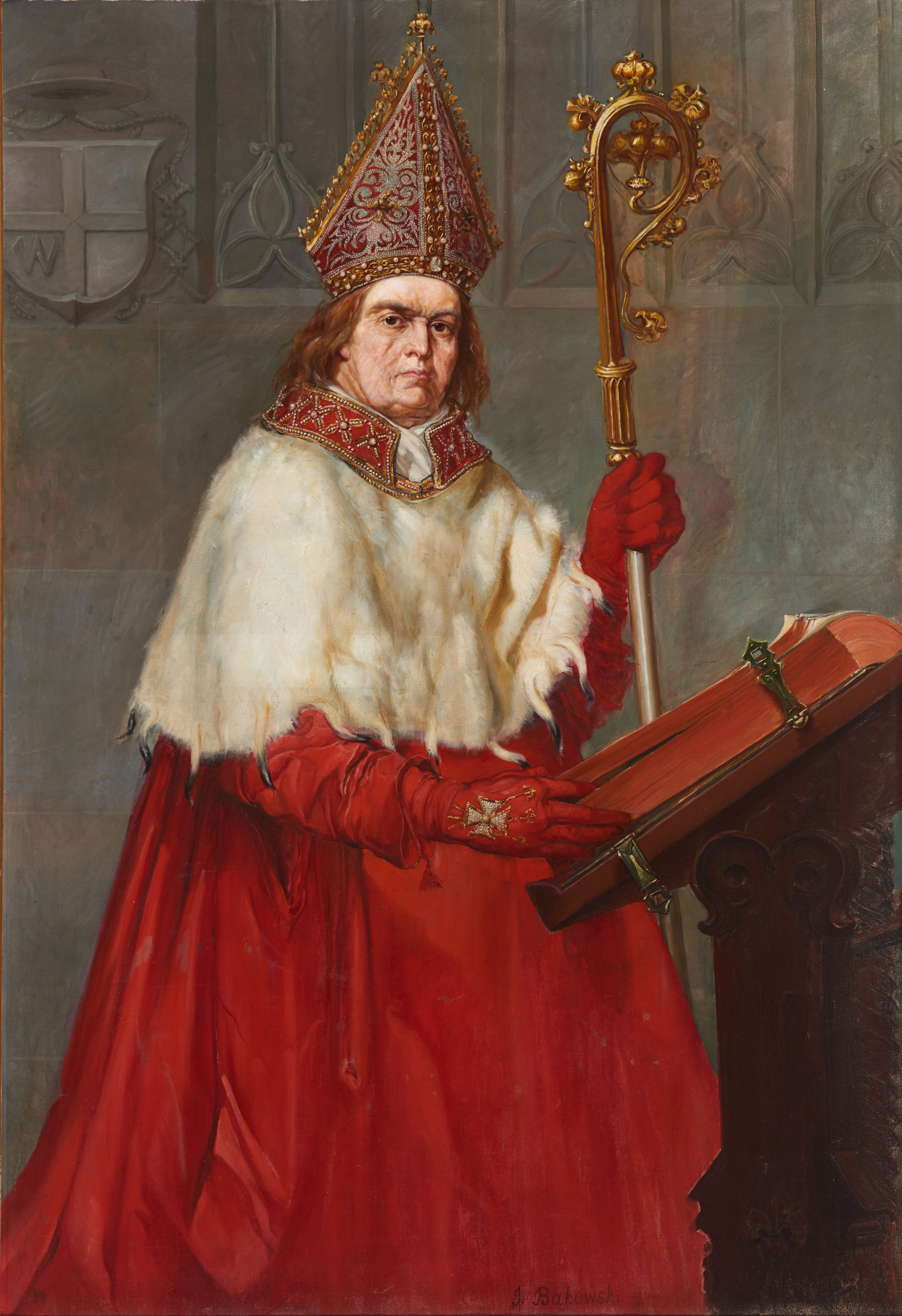
- Oleśnicki painted by Jan Bąkowski, 1900.
- Installed: 1423
- Term ended: 1455
- Predecessor: Wojciech Jastrzębiec
- Successor: Tomasz Strzępiński
- Other posts: Statesman and diplomat

Personal details
- Born: 5 December 1389 Sienno, Kingdom of Poland
- Died: 1 April 1455 (aged 65) Sandomierz, Kingdom of Poland
- Buried: Wawel Cathedral
- Denomination: Roman Catholic
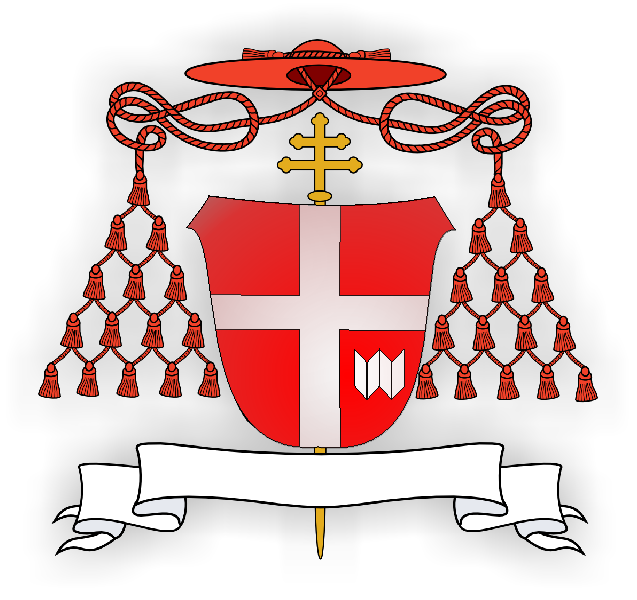
- Coat of arms

Zbigniew Oleśnicki (Polish: [ˈzbiɡɲɛf ɔlɛɕˈɲit͡skʲi]; 5 December 1389 – 1 April 1455), known in Latin as Sbigneus, was a high-ranking Roman Catholic clergyman and an influential Polish statesman and diplomat. He served as Bishop of Kraków from 1423 until his death in 1455. He took part in the management of the country's most important affairs, initially as a royal secretary under King Władysław II Jagiełło and later as the effective regent during King Władysław III's minority. In 1439, he became the first native Polish cardinal.

== Biography ==
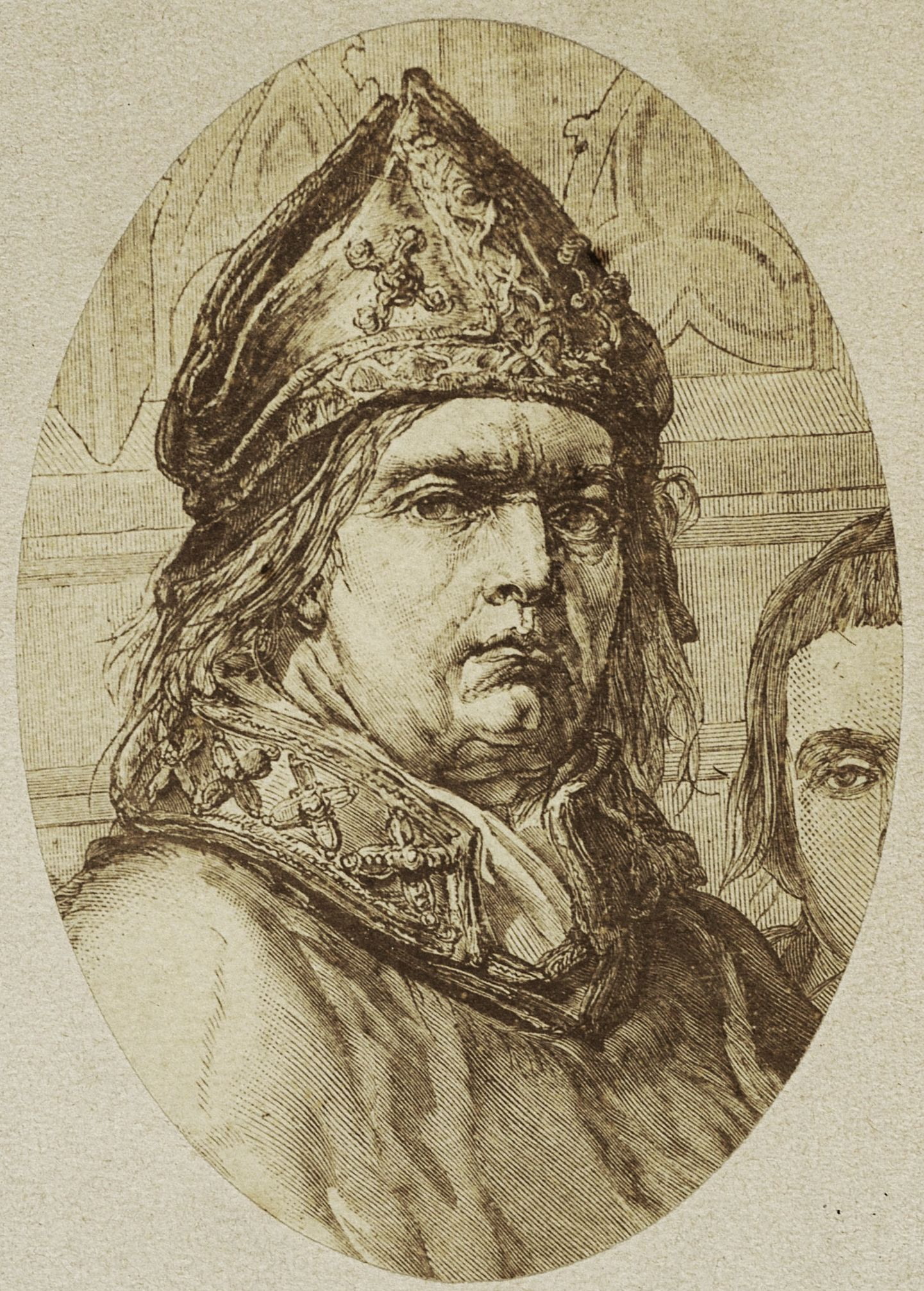
Oleśnicki according to a sketch by Jan Matejko

Shortly before his birth, his father, Jan Oleśnicki, was dispatched by King Władysław II Jagiełło to serve as captain of Vilnius and to bring a detachment of knights there. At the beginning of the Lithuanian Civil War the city was under the governance of the Polish king's brother, Skirgaila, and came under siege by the combined forces of the pagan Samogitians under Jagiello's cousin and rival Vytautas and the army of the Teutonic Order with their guest crusaders from France, England, and the Holy Roman Empire. He was apparently successful in his mission as, despite repeated sieges, the Teutonic Order was never able to take Vilnius.

At the age of twenty, he was secretary to King Władysław II Jagiełło, and fought with him in the battle of Grunwald on 15 July 1410. A favourite with the king, he took part in the management of the country's most important affairs. His influence with the king greatly aided him in opposing the Hussites, who had gained royal favour. On 9 July 1423, he was appointed to the episcopal See of Kraków, and in 1433 he was sent by the king as legate to the council of Basle, where he endeavoured to be on friendly terms with both parties.

In the 1430s, he opposed Spytko III of Melsztyn in a conflict which led to a short lived civil war and Spytko's death in 1439.

On 18 December 1439, he was created cardinal priest with the titular church of St. Prisca, by Pope Eugene IV. (The antipope Felix V also made him a cardinal on 20 January 1440.). As cardinal, his influence in Poland was second only to that of the king, and, during the frequent absence of Casimir IV in Lithuania, he transacted the affairs of the State.

He was recognized as one of the two most important Polish magnates of his time (the other one was magnate Jan Tęczyński).

In 1449, after the death of archbishop of Gniezno and primate of Poland Wincenty Kot, the position was proposed to Oleśnicki, but he refused it. It then passed to his political rival, bishop Władysław Oporowski.

In his conduct of Poland's affairs, Oleśnicki entertained far-reaching imperial dreams, which included a complete assimilation of Lithuania into the Polish state and the conquest of Silesia from the Kingdom of Bohemia. In particular, Oleśnicki pursued the idea of a Crusading alliance with Hungary against the Ottoman Turks, with the ultimate aim of extending Poland's boundaries to the Black Sea. This was manifested in promoting Władysław III's taking the Hungarian Crown - to which some Polish magnates were strongly opposed. However, all these aspirations came to naught with King Władysław's death at the Battle of Varna.

Being a man of great learning, he advanced the study of arts and letters in every possible way, and the flourishing condition of the University of Krakow during his episcopacy is due chiefly to his efforts. The well-known chronicler Jan Długosz was his secretary. To repress the spread of Hussitism he called Giovanni da Capistrano (then in Breslau) and the Minorites to Kraków.

Da Capistrano, whom Oleśnicki invited, was also known for his anti-Jewish zeal, in which he engaged in Poland as in other countries. Oleśnicki's own Anti-Jewish intolerance was manifested in his strongly criticising Casimir IV Jagiellon for reaffirming in 1453 the tolerant measures towards Jews enacted by Casimir III the Great. Under Oleśnicki's influence, the 1454 Statutes of Nieszawa included the provisions that Jews' rights be "restricted when they contradict canon law" and that Polish Jews be compelled to wear distinctive clothing. However, this was never enforced in practice.

== Bibliography ==
- "Oleśnicki Zbigniew". Internetowa encyklopedia PWN (in Polish). Wydawnictwo Naukowe PWN. Archived from the original on 2011-06-07.
- "Oleśnicki Zbigniew". WIEM Encyklopedia (in Polish). Archived from the original on 2006-11-26.

Preceded by Wojciech Jastrzębiec	Bishop of Kraków; 1423 – 1455	Succeeded by Tomasz Strzępiński
