= Jaworzyna =

Jaworzyna may refer to the following places:

- Jaworzyna, Łódź Voivodeship (central Poland)
- Jaworzyna, a mountain in the Silesian Beskids in Poland
- Polish name for Tatranská Javorina in Slovakia
