= Szczyt, Łódź Voivodeship =

Szczyt
- Village
- Location within Poland
- Coordinates: 52°14′N 19°30′E
- Country: Poland
- Voivodeship: Łódź
- County: Kutno
- Gmina: Oporów

Szczyt [ʂt͡ʂɨt] is a village in the administrative district of Gmina Oporów, within Kutno County, Łódź Voivodeship in central Poland, approximately 5 km (3 mi) west of Oporów, 10 km (6 mi) east of Kutno, and 50 km (31 mi) north of the regional capital Łódź.
