= Kurów-Wieś =

- Village
- Location within Poland
- Coordinates: 52°16′54″N 19°32′20″E
- Country: Poland
- Voivodeship: Łódź
- County: Kutno
- Gmina: Oporów

Kurów-Wieś (Polish pronunciation: [ˈkuruv ˈvjɛɕ]) is a village in the administrative district of Gmina Oporów, within Kutno County, Łódź Voivodeship, in central Poland.
