= Skarżyn, Łódź Voivodeship =

Skarżyn
- Village
- Location within Poland
- Coordinates: 52°17′57″N 19°32′22″E
- Country: Poland
- Voivodeship: Łódź
- County: Kutno
- Gmina: Oporów

Skarżyn [ˈskarʐɨn] is a village in the administrative district of Gmina Oporów, within Kutno County, Łódź Voivodeship, in central Poland.
