= Mnich-Ośrodek =

- Village
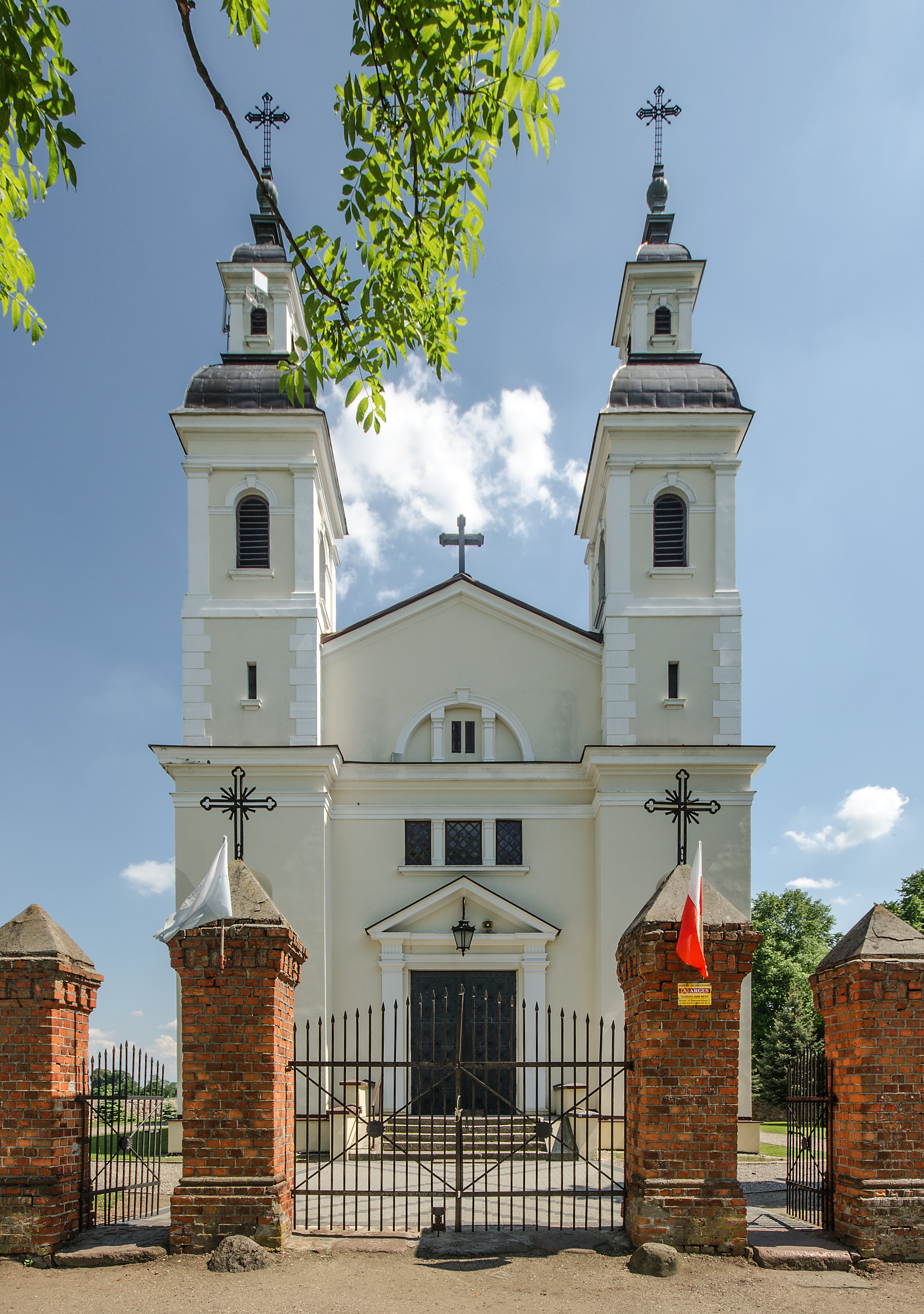
- Catholic church

- Location within Poland
- Coordinates: 52°15′15″N 19°28′53″E
- Country: Poland
- Voivodeship: Łódź
- County: Kutno
- Gmina: Oporów

Mnich-Ośrodek [ˈmnix ɔˈɕrɔdɛk] is a village in the administrative district of Gmina Oporów, within Kutno County, Łódź Voivodeship, in central Poland.
