= Dmosin Drugi =

- Village
- Location within Poland
- Coordinates: 51°55′50″N 19°45′15″E
- Country: Poland
- Voivodeship: Łódź
- County: Brzeziny
- Gmina: Dmosin
- Population: 350

Dmosin Drugi [ˈdmɔɕin ˈdruɡi] ("Dmosin the second") is a sołectwo in the administrative district of Gmina Dmosin, within Brzeziny County, Łódź Voivodeship, in central Poland. It is one of three sołectwos (Dmosin, Dmosin Pierwszy and Dmosin Drugi) making up the location commonly referred to as Dmosin.
