= Mnich-Południe =

- Village
- Location within Poland
- Coordinates: 52°15′22″N 19°27′46″E
- Country: Poland
- Voivodeship: Łódź
- County: Kutno
- Gmina: Oporów

Mnich-Południe [ˈmnix pɔˈwudɲɛ] is a village in the administrative district of Gmina Oporów, within Kutno County, Łódź Voivodeship, in central Poland.
