= Podgajew, Łódź Voivodeship =

Podgajew
- Village
- Location within Poland
- Coordinates: 52°14′20″N 19°28′17″E
- Country: Poland
- Voivodeship: Łódź
- County: Kutno
- Gmina: Oporów

Podgajew [pɔdˈɡajɛf] is a village in the administrative district of Gmina Oporów, within Kutno County, Łódź Voivodeship, in central Poland.
