= Kolonia Oporów =

- Village
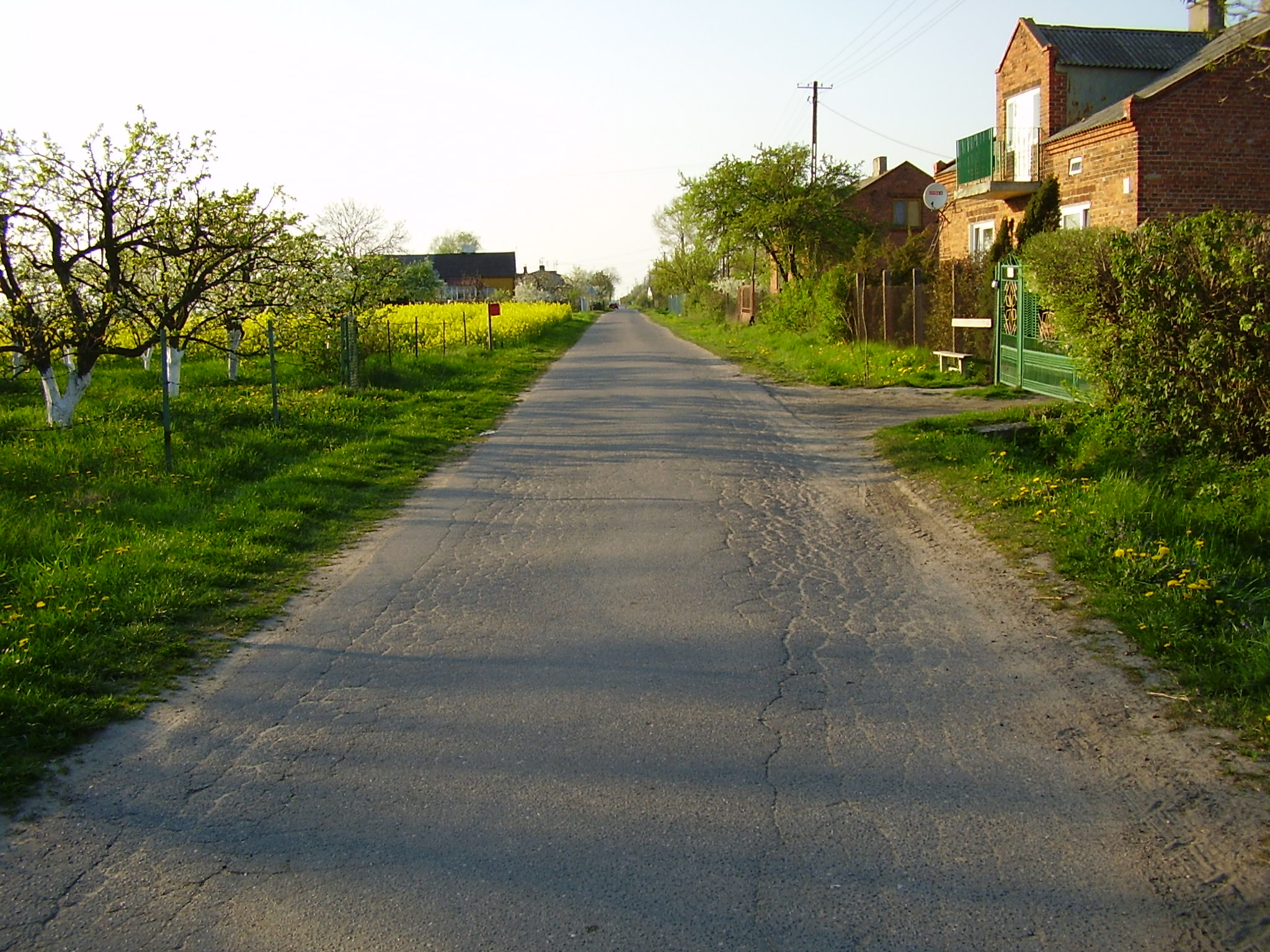

- Location within Poland
- Coordinates: 52°15′N 19°34′E
- Country: Poland
- Voivodeship: Łódź
- County: Kutno
- Gmina: Oporów
- Population (approx.): 140

Kolonia Oporów [kɔˈlɔɲa ɔˈpɔruf] is a village in the administrative district of Gmina Oporów, within Kutno County, Łódź Voivodeship, in central Poland.

The village has an approximate population of 140. Until 1 January 2018, its name was Oporów-Kolonia.
