= Świechów =

- Village
- Location within Poland
- Coordinates: 52°16′N 19°35′E
- Country: Poland
- Voivodeship: Łódź
- County: Kutno
- Gmina: Oporów

Świechów (Polish pronunciation: [ˈɕfjɛxuf]) is a village in the administrative district of Gmina Oporów, within Kutno County, Łódź Voivodeship, in central Poland.
