= Jurków Pierwszy =

- Village
- Location within Poland
- Coordinates: 52°14′48″N 19°34′12″E
- Country: Poland
- Voivodeship: Łódź
- County: Kutno
- Gmina: Oporów

Jurków Pierwszy [ˈjurkuf ˈpjɛrfʂɨ] is a village in the administrative district of Gmina Oporów, within Kutno County, Łódź Voivodeship, in central Poland.
