= Jastrzębia, Kutno County =

Jastrzębia
- Village
- Location within Poland
- Coordinates: 52°16′12″N 19°36′3″E
- Country: Poland
- Voivodeship: Łódź
- County: Kutno
- Gmina: Oporów

Jastrzębia [jasˈtʂɛmbja] is a village in the administrative district of Gmina Oporów, within Kutno County, Łódź Voivodeship, in central Poland.
