= Samogoszcz, Łódź Voivodeship =

Samogoszcz
- Village
- Location within Poland
- Coordinates: 52°16′31″N 19°30′40″E
- Country: Poland
- Voivodeship: Łódź
- County: Kutno
- Gmina: Oporów

Samogoszcz [saˈmɔɡɔʂt͡ʂ] is a village in the administrative district of Gmina Oporów, within Kutno County, Łódź Voivodeship, in central Poland.
