= Golędzkie =

- Village
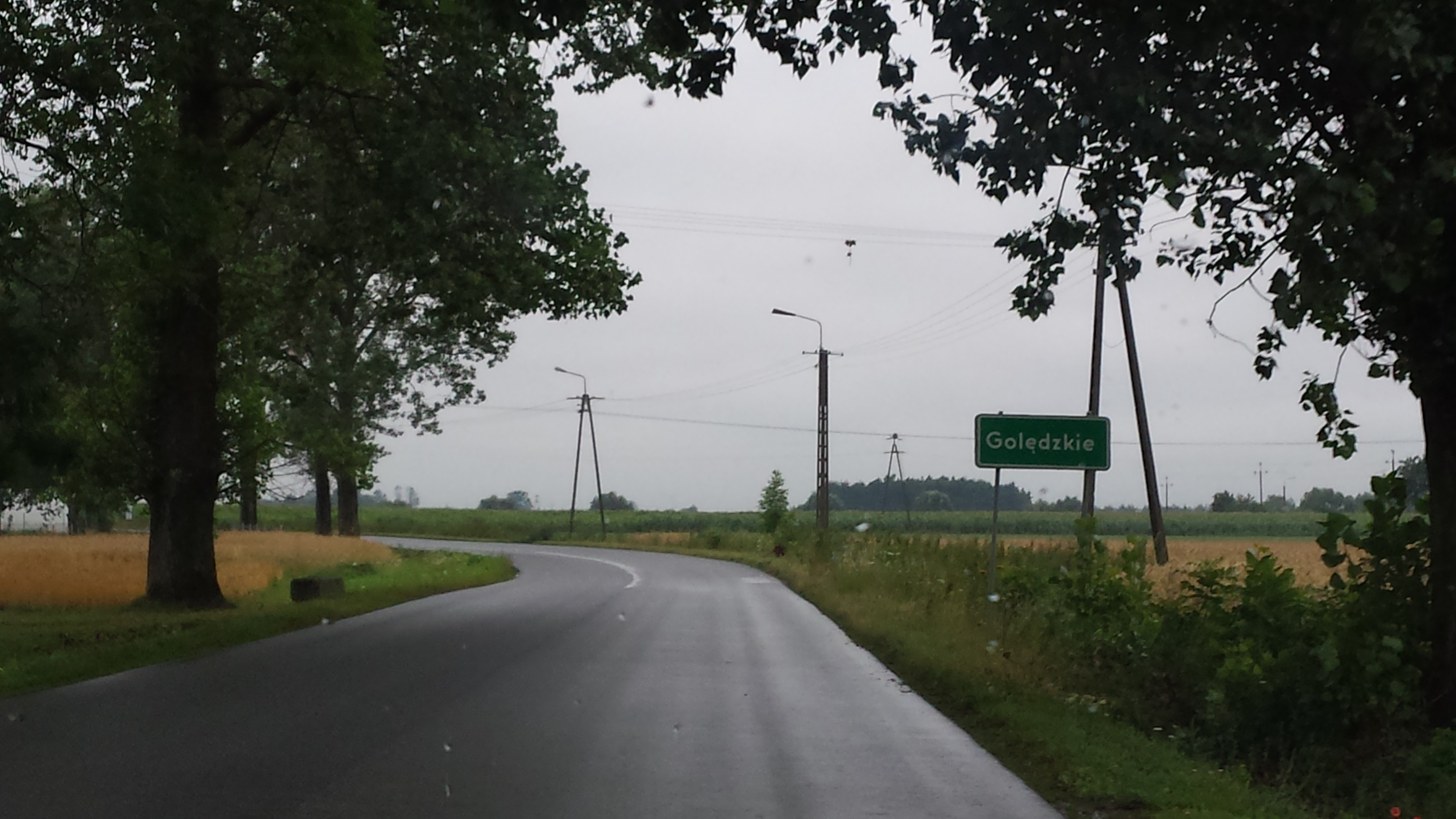

- Location within Poland
- Coordinates: 52°15′33″N 19°30′46″E
- Country: Poland
- Voivodeship: Łódź
- County: Kutno
- Gmina: Oporów

Golędzkie [ɡɔˈlɛnt͡skʲɛ] is a village in the administrative district of Gmina Oporów, within Kutno County, Łódź Voivodeship, in central Poland.
