= Janów, Gmina Oporów =

Janów
- Village
- Location within Poland
- Coordinates: 52°16′26″N 19°34′56″E
- Country: Poland
- Voivodeship: Łódź
- County: Kutno
- Gmina: Oporów

Janów [ˈjanuf] is a village in the administrative district of Gmina Oporów, within Kutno County, Łódź Voivodeship, in central Poland.
