= Skórzewa =

- Village
- Location within Poland
- Coordinates: 52°17′N 19°29′E
- Country: Poland
- Voivodeship: Łódź
- County: Kutno
- Gmina: Oporów

Skórzewa [skuˈʐɛva] is a village in the administrative district of Gmina Oporów, within Kutno County, Łódź Voivodeship, in central Poland.
