= Kurów-Parcel =

- Village
- Location within Poland
- Coordinates: 52°17′8″N 19°33′2″E
- Country: Poland
- Voivodeship: Łódź
- County: Kutno
- Gmina: Oporów

Kurów-Parcel [ˈkuruf ˈpart͡sɛl] is a village in the administrative district of Gmina Oporów, within Kutno County, Łódź Voivodeship, in central Poland.
