= Dmosin Pierwszy =

- Village
- Location within Poland
- Coordinates: 51°55′22″N 19°44′8″E
- Country: Poland
- Voivodeship: Łódź
- County: Brzeziny
- Gmina: Dmosin
- Population: 190

Dmosin Pierwszy [ˈdmɔɕin ˈpjɛrfʂɨ] ("Dmosin the first") is a sołectwo in the administrative district of Gmina Dmosin, within Brzeziny County, Łódź Voivodeship, in central Poland. It is one of three sołectwos (Dmosin, Dmosin Pierwszy and Dmosin Drugi) making up the location commonly referred to as Dmosin.
