= Stanisławów, Gmina Oporów =

Stanisławów
- Village
- Location within Poland
- Coordinates: 52°16′13″N 19°29′8″E
- Country: Poland
- Voivodeship: Łódź
- County: Kutno
- Gmina: Oporów

Stanisławów [staniˈswavuf] is a village in the administrative district of Gmina Oporów, within Kutno County, Łódź Voivodeship, in central Poland.
