= Wincenty Kot =

Polish archbishop

His Excellency Wincenty Kot
- Archbishop of Gniezno; Primate of Poland
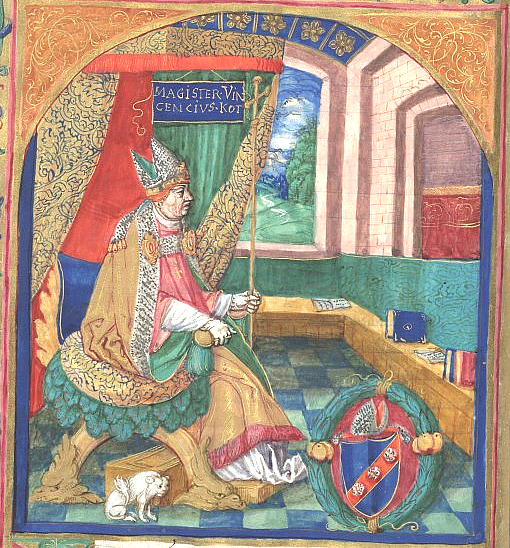
- Church: Roman Catholic
- Archdiocese: Gniezno
- Installed: 1437
- Term ended: 1448

Personal details
- Born: 1395
- Died: 14 August 1448 (aged 52–53) Gniezno
- Coat of arms

Wincenty II Kot (c. 1395–1448) was a 15th-century Roman Catholic Archbishop of Gniezno, in Poland.

== Early life ==
He was born around 1395. Before he was elected Archbishop of Gniezno he was a teacher and tutor of the king's sons Wladyslaw and Kazimierz. Kot caught the attention of Wladyslaw Jagiello on a visit to Lithuania. Kot soon after moved to the Wawel Castle, where the royal family lived.

At the end of May 1434 Wladyslaw Jagiello contracted pneumonia while out listening to the songs of nightingales in the woods near Przemyśl and died on 1 June at the age of 83. Two years later, when the post of archbishop of Gniezno became vacant, the new king put his tutor into the office. He was consecrated on 15 March 1437 by the then Bishop of Cracow, Zbigniew Oleśnicki. Bishop Kot held the office of the Archbishop of Gniezno for 12 years. He was also titular bishop of San Crisogono and Vice-Chancellor of the Crown.

== Bishop ==
Bishop Kot went to work in the archdiocese with great enthusiasm. He consistently defended the purity of faith and persistently worked on raising the religious life of the clergy and the faithful. He also took care of the Cathedral of Gniezno, which he found to be dirty and worn. He was known as a "man commonly known and revered for science, a truly priestly soul and rare nobility of character." And he was able to lead in financial management.

He also took care of those who worked in the church estates, especially the peasants, whose fate especially lay in his heart.

Kot was also a statesman of great stature, skillfully moving through court and church politics and operating in diplomatic channels.

- In 1447 he crowned his younger pupil Casimir. However, in 1448, there was a problem of priority when the Bishop of Krakow Olesnicki received the long-awaited cardinal's hat and claimed priority over the primate. The dispute took three years to resolve, when it was decided that both bishops should take part in the deliberations of the Royal Council.
- He supported the antipope Felix V, who made him a cardinal (c. 1441) but later went to recognize Pope Nicholas V in Rome.
- He fought the influence Hussitism, supporting Bishop Zbigniew Oleśnicki, in the Battle of Grotniki 1439.

He took a particular liking to Łowicz, where he usually lived.

He died on 14 August 1448, in Uniejów, and on 19 August was buried in the Cathedral of Gniezno. He was about 53 years old. He was remembered at that time as "extremely shrewd, energetic and devout, looking forward to universal respect and trust".

Religious titles
Preceded by Wojciech I Jastrzębiec	Archbishop of Gniezno; 1437–1448	Succeeded by Władysław I Oporowski
