= Wólka-Lizigódź =

- Village
- Location within Poland
- Coordinates: 52°15′02″N 19°32′05″E
- Country: Poland
- Voivodeship: Łódź
- County: Kutno
- Gmina: Oporów

Wólka-Lizigódź [ˈvulka liˈʑiɡut͡ɕ] is a village in the administrative district of Gmina Oporów, within Kutno County, Łódź Voivodeship, located seventy-seven miles west of Warsaw, Poland.
