= Pobórz =

- Village
- Location within Poland
- Coordinates: 52°18′N 19°32′E
- Country: Poland
- Voivodeship: Łódź
- County: Kutno
- Gmina: Oporów

Pobórz [ˈpɔbuʂ] is a village in the administrative district of Gmina Oporów, within Kutno County, Łódź Voivodeship, in central Poland.
