= Jurków Drugi =

- Village
- Location within Poland
- Coordinates: 52°16′16″N 19°32′13″E
- Country: Poland
- Voivodeship: Łódź
- County: Kutno
- Gmina: Oporów

Jurków Drugi [ˈjurkuf ˈdruɡi] is a village in the administrative district of Gmina Oporów, within Kutno County, Łódź Voivodeship, in central Poland.
