= Dmosin =

- Village
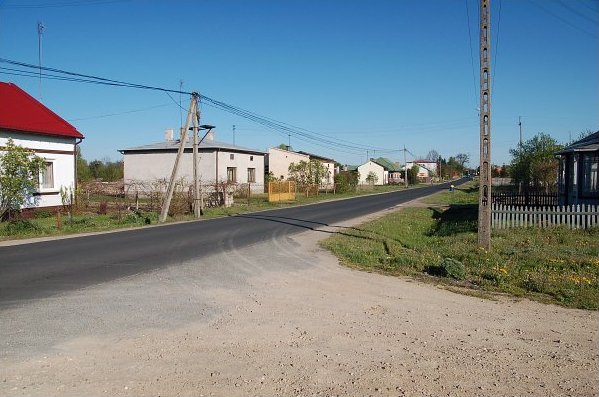
- Głowno - Kołacin road passing through Dmosin

- Location within Poland
- Coordinates: 51°55′33″N 19°45′24″E
- Country: Poland
- Voivodeship: Łódź
- County: Brzeziny
- Gmina: Dmosin
- Population (approx.): 1,500

Dmosin [ˈdmɔɕin] is a village in Brzeziny County, Łódź Voivodeship, in central Poland. It is the seat of the gmina (administrative district) called Gmina Dmosin. It consists of three sołectwos: Dmosin, Dmosin Pierwszy ("first Dmosin") and Dmosin Drugi ("second Dmosin").

The village has an approximate population of 1,500.
