= Jaworzyna, Łódź Voivodeship =

Jaworzyna
- Village
- Location within Poland
- Coordinates: 52°16′54″N 19°30′48″E
- Country: Poland
- Voivodeship: Łódź
- County: Kutno
- Gmina: Oporów

Jaworzyna [javɔˈʐɨna] is a village in the administrative district of Gmina Oporów, within Kutno County, Łódź Voivodeship, in central Poland.
