= Mnich, Kutno County =

Mnich
- Village
- Location within Poland
- Coordinates: 52°15′23″N 19°28′38″E
- Country: Poland
- Voivodeship: Łódź
- County: Kutno
- Gmina: Oporów

Mnich [mnix] is a village in the administrative district of Gmina Oporów, within Kutno County, Łódź Voivodeship, in central Poland.
