= Casimir IV Jagiellon =

King of Poland (1447–1492) and Grand Duke of Lithuania (1440–1492)

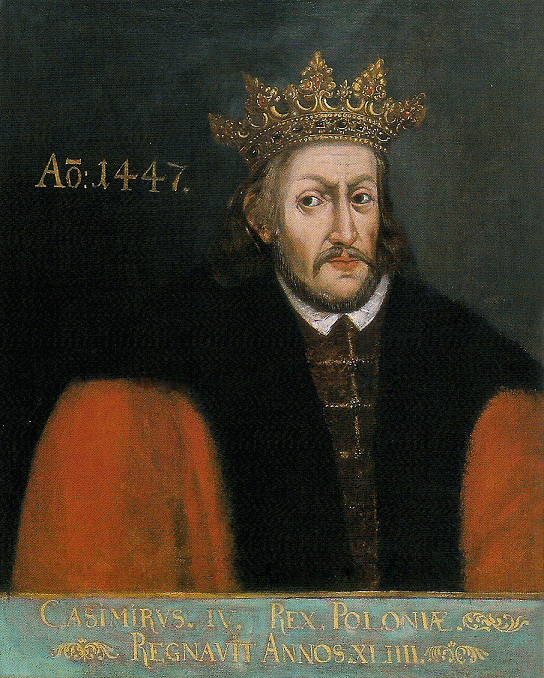
- Casimir IV, 17th century depiction by an unknown artist

Grand Duke of Lithuania
- Reign: 29 June 1440 – 7 June 1492
- Coronation: 29 June 1440 in Vilnius Cathedral
- Predecessor: Władysław and Sigismund Kęstutaitis
- Successor: Alexander and John Albert (Note: John Albert styled himself as the Supreme Duke sometime after Alexander's election as the Grand Duke in July 1492. His title was recognized by Alexander but not by Lithuanian Council of Lords.)
- Co-ruler: Władysław (1440–1444)

King of Poland
- Reign: 25 June 1447 – 7 June 1492
- Coronation: 25 June 1447 in Wawel Cathedral
- Predecessor: Władysław III
- Successor: John I Albert
- Born: 30 November 1427; Kraków, Kingdom of Poland
- Died: 7 June 1492 (aged 64); Old Grodno Castle
- Burial: Wawel Cathedral, Kraków
- Spouse: Elisabeth of Austria (m. 1454)
- Issue more...: Vladislaus II, King of Bohemia and Hungary; Hedwig, Duchess of Bavaria; St. Casimir Jagiellon; John I Albert, King of Poland; Alexander, King of Poland; Sophia, Margravine of Brandenburg; Sigismund I, King of Poland; Frederick, Archbishop of Gniezno; Anna, Duchess of Pomerania; Barbara, Duchess of Saxony
Names
- Casimir Andrew Jagiellon
- Dynasty: Jagiellon
- Father: Władysław II Jagiełło
- Mother: Sophia of Halshany

Casimir Andrew Jagiellon (Polish: Kazimierz Andrzej Jagiellończyk [kaˈʑimjɛʂ jaɡʲɛ(l)ˈlɔj̃t͡ʂɨk]; Lithuanian: Kazimieras Andrius Jogailaitis; Belarusian: Казімір Андрэй Ягайлавіч; 30 November 1427 – 7 June 1492) was Grand Duke of Lithuania from 1440 and King of Poland as Casimir IV from 1447 until his death in 1492. He was one of the most active Polish-Lithuanian rulers; under him, Poland defeated the Teutonic Knights in the Thirteen Years' War and recovered Pomerania.

The Jagiellonian dynasty became one of the leading royal houses in Europe. The great triumph of his reign was bringing Prussia under Polish rule. The rule of Casimir corresponded to the age of "new monarchies" in western Europe. By the 15th century, Poland had narrowed the distance separating it from Western Europe and became a significant power in international relations. The demand for raw materials and semi-finished goods stimulated trade, producing a positive balance, and contributed to the growth of crafts and mining in the entire country. He was a recipient of the English Order of the Garter (KG), the highest order of chivalry and the most prestigious honour in England.

Casimir IV died in 1492 and was buried in the Holy Cross Chapel of Wawel Cathedral, in a tomb sculpted in red marble by Veit Stoss between 1492 and 1496. Following Casimir IV's death in 1492, John I Albert succeeded him as the King of Poland, and Alexander Jagiellon was proclaimed Grand Duke of Lithuania with John Albert claiming the status of his senior co-ruler and the Supreme Duke.

== Youth ==
Casimir Jagiellon was the third and youngest son of King Władysław II Jagiełło (known as Jogaila) and his fourth wife, Sophia of Halshany. Casimir's mother was 40 to 50 years younger than his father, which caused widespread speculations that the children were the product of adultery. A scandal erupted when Sophia was accused of marital infidelity and two of her ladies-in-waiting were subsequently arrested and tortured for disseminating the rumours. To eliminate hearsay, Władysław II placed Sophia before a court. It is likely that the Teutonic Order and Grand Master Paul von Rusdorf were implicated. Following Casimir's birth, Sophia pledged an oath of innocence (iuramentum purgatorium) and the charges were dismissed. The question of paternity did not persist long as many of the children, including Casimir, closely resembled their elderly father.

He was baptised on 21 December 1427 and was named after his deceased brother. Stanisław Ciołek, Bishop of Poznań, or Mikołaj z Radomia composed a panegyric contrafactum titled Hystorigraphi aciem in honour of his birth, which was sung at the christening ceremony. In his early years, Casimir was nursed by his mother and supervised by vice-chancellor Wincenty Kot, the future Archbishop of Gniezno and Primate of Poland, as well as by a knight named Piotr of Rytro. Casimir often relied on his instinct and feelings and had little political knowledge, but shared a great interest in the diplomacy and economic affairs of the country. After the accession of his brother, Władysław III, to the throne of Poland, the tutelage was assigned to Cardinal Zbigniew Oleśnicki; however, the cleric neglected his duties as he felt a strong reluctance towards Casimir, believing that he would be an unsuccessful monarch following Władysław's death.

== Grand Duke of Lithuania ==
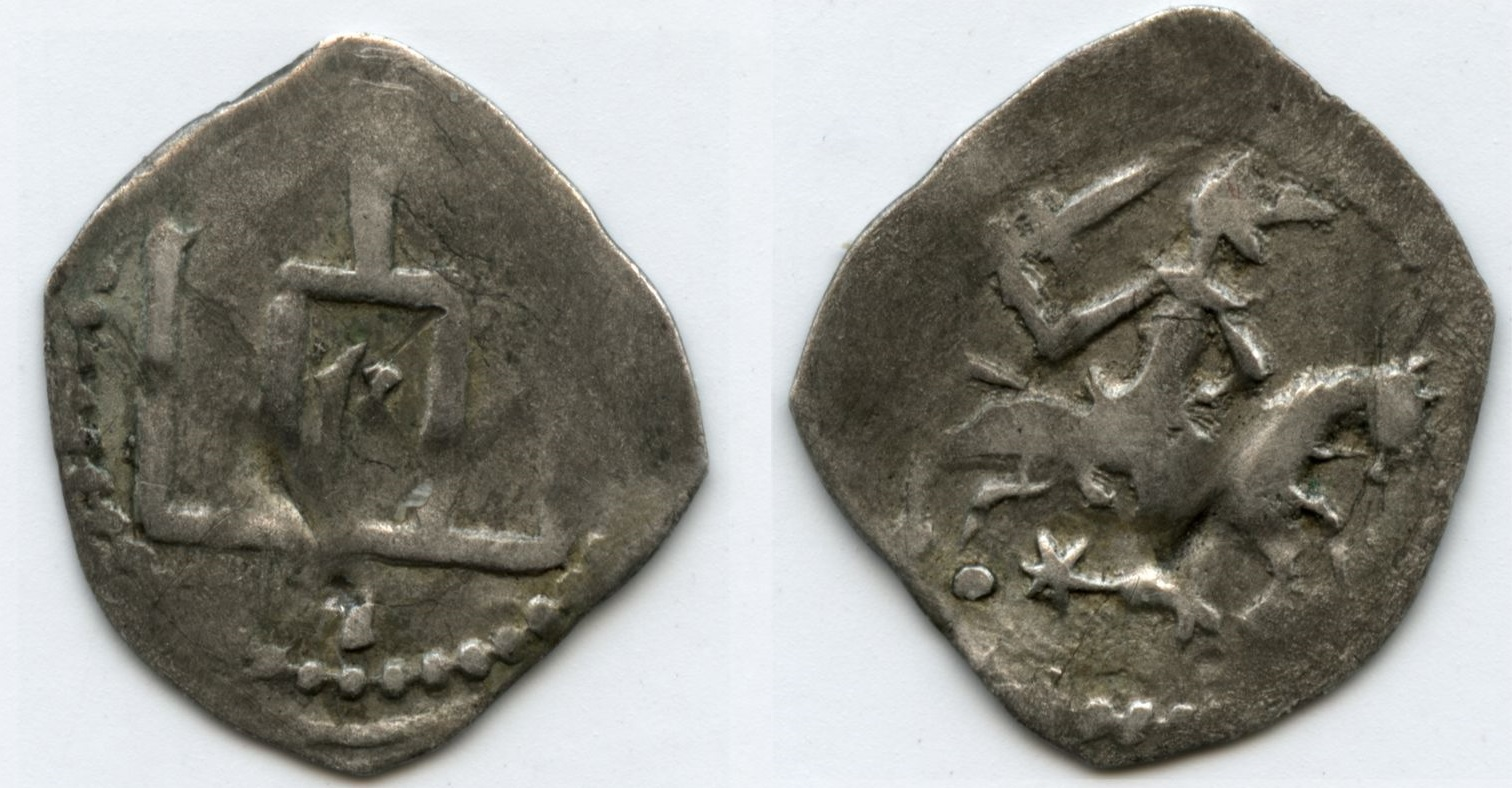
Lithuanian coin of Grand Duke Casimir IV Jagiellon with the Columns of the Gediminids and Vytis (Pogonia)

The sudden death of Sigismund Kęstutaitis left the Grand Duchy of Lithuania without a monarch, thus increasing its vulnerability. His assassination, reportedly orchestrated by political opponents associated with Švitrigaila, created a power vacuum that intensified the ongoing rivalry between factions in the Grand Duchy. The Voivode of Trakai, Jonas Goštautas, and other magnates of Lithuania, supported Casimir as a candidate to the Lithuanian throne. However, many Polish nobles hoped that the thirteen-year-old boy would become a vice-regent for Poland in Lithuania to secure Polish interests there. Casimir was invited by the Lithuanian magnates to Lithuania, and when he arrived in Vilnius in 1440, he was proclaimed as the Grand Duke of Lithuania on 29 June 1440 by the Council of Lords, contrary to the wishes of the Polish noble lords — an act supported and coordinated by Goštautas.

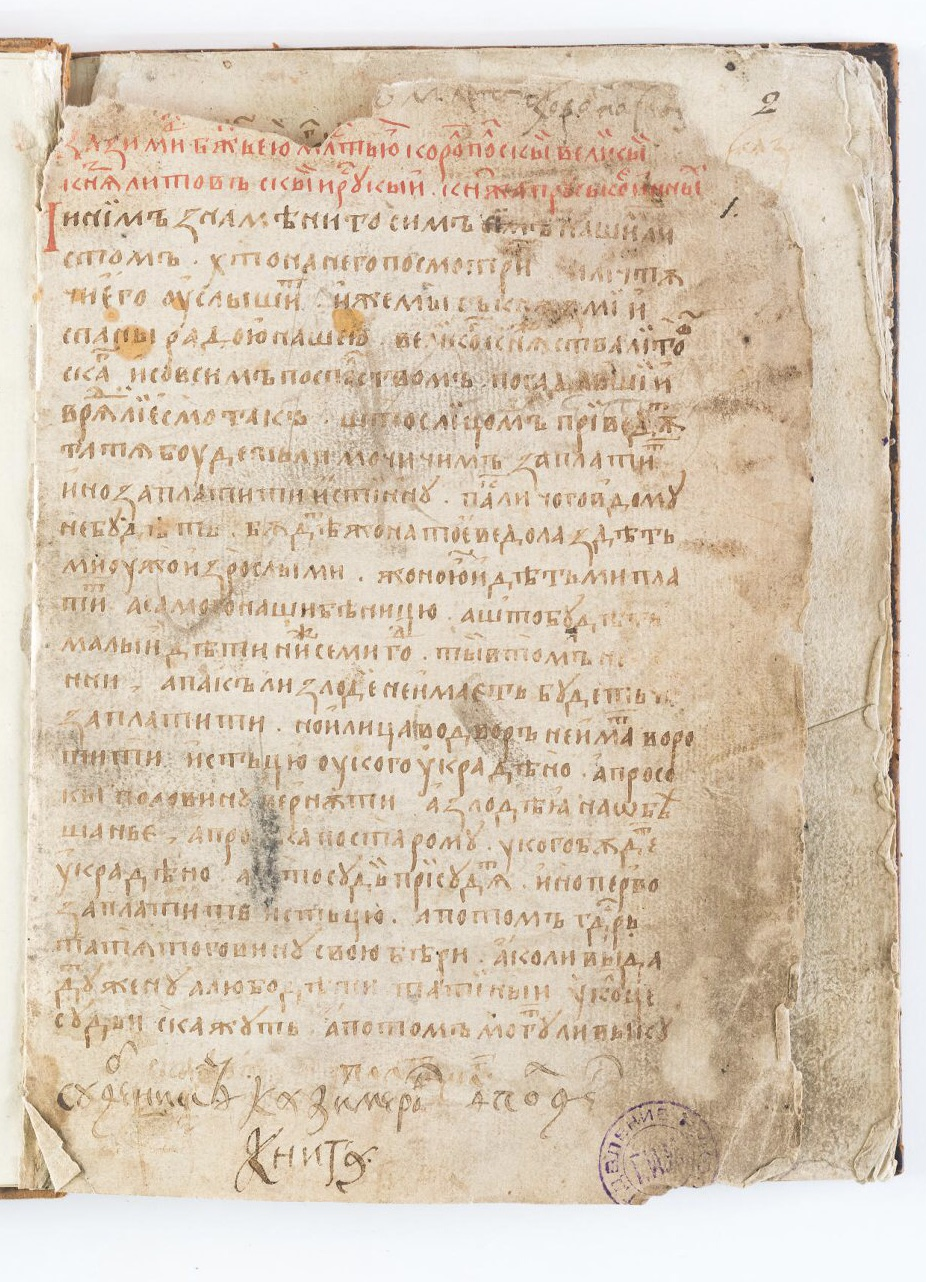
A page from Casimir's Code (Sudebnik of 1468), written in the Ruthenian language.

During Casimir IV's reign, the Ruthenian language remained the primary language of the chancery and legal documentation in the Grand Duchy of Lithuania. This is evidenced by his own Latin charters, where he used Ruthenian words to explain Latin legal terms, marking them as "in vulgari" (in the vernacular). For example, in a 1441 charter to the burghers of Vilnius he used "Schrotarstwo" (carpentry/guild), and in a 1449 charter he used "dworecz" (manor). Furthermore, the Ruthenian Orthodox aristocracy competed for influence in the Grand Duchy during his rule, and the literary Ruthenian language maintained its status in state affairs.Casimir's Code (Sudebnik of 1468), the first unified code of criminal and procedural law of the Grand Duchy of Lithuania, was written in Ruthenian. During his reign, Casimir IV maintained a policy of religious tolerance in the Grand Duchy of Lithuania. He confirmed the rights and privileges of the Eastern Orthodox Church, which was the dominant faith among the Ruthenian population.

When the news arrived in the Kingdom of Poland concerning the proclamation of Casimir as the Grand Duke of Lithuania, it was met with hostility, even to the point of military threats against Lithuania. The Polish side had expected to oversee the transition of power in Lithuania and feared the loss of leverage over its eastern partner. Throughout the early 1440s, there were repeated efforts by Polish envoys to reassert influence over Lithuania or to compel Casimir to recognise Poland's suzerainty. These efforts were rebuffed by the Lithuanians, who used Casimir's youth and local presence as a political tool. Despite the fraternal relationship between Casimir IV and Władysław III, no formal reconciliation occurred during this time. Tensions remained unresolved, partly because Władysław, after assuming the Hungarian crown in 1440, became increasingly entangled in affairs beyond the Carpathians, including preparations for a crusade against the Ottoman Empire. His focus on Hungary and the Balkan frontier diverted attention from Lithuanian affairs, allowing Casimir to solidify independent rule.

Since the young Grand Duke was underage, the supreme control over the Grand Duchy of Lithuania was in the hands of the Council, personally presided by Goštautas. Furthermore, Casimir was taught the Lithuanian language and the customs of Lithuania by appointed court officials. During Casimir's rule the rights of the Lithuanian nobility — dukes, magnates, and boyars (lesser nobles), irrespective of their religion and ethnicity — were put on an equal footing to those of the Polish szlachta. Additionally, Casimir promised to protect the Grand Duchy's borders and not to appoint persons from the Polish Kingdom to the offices of the Grand Duchy. He accepted that decisions on matters concerning the Grand Duchy would not be made without the Council of Lords' consent. He also granted the subject region of Samogitia the right to elect its own elder. Casimir was the first ruler of Lithuania to be baptised at birth, becoming the first native Roman Catholic Grand Duke.

== King of Poland ==
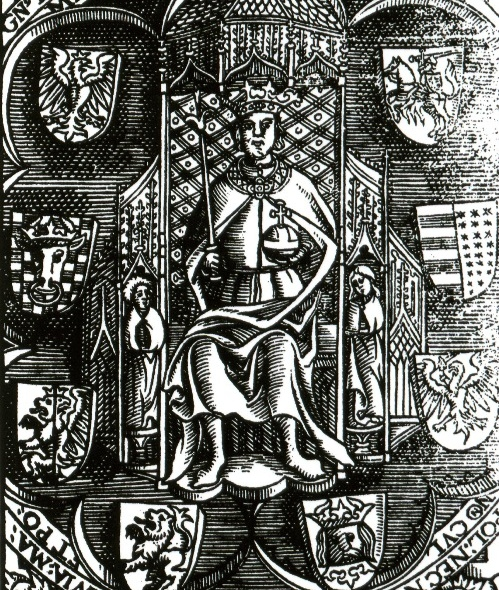
15th century seal depicting Casimir IV on the throne.

=== Dynastic struggle ===
In 1427, the Polish nobility initiated an anti-Jagiellonian opposition and attempted to have Władysław II Jagiełło's sons Władysław III and Casimir IV Jagiellon declared illegitimate to the Polish throne as they, being sons of a Lithuanian noblewoman Sophia of Halshany, had no blood link to the previous ruling Polish dynasty, the Piasts, however Casimir's father ensured the succession for his sons. Moreover, the death of Casimir's elder brother, Władysław III, at the Battle of Varna (1444) during a crusade against the Ottoman Empire, created a potentially dangerous leadership vacuum. Władysław's death left Poland without a clear successor and Casimir was fraught with political manoeuvring and rivalries within the Polish nobility class.

After a three-year interregnum marred by political contestation and negotiations, Casimir was elected King of Poland in 1447. His ascension was supported by key factions, but not without opposition. The Prussian Confederation, composed of the cities in the region of Prussia, as well as some nobles, viewed his reign as a shift towards centralisation. Casimir's acceptance of the Polish crown was contingent upon his willingness to adopt a dual role as both King of Poland and Grand Duke of Lithuania, thereby maintaining the balance of power between the two realms. At his coronation on 25 June 1447, Casimir became both the King of Poland and Grand Duke of Lithuania, a position he would hold until his death.

=== Royal authority ===
The question of the political relationship between Poland and Lithuania was an ongoing handicap throughout Casimir IV's reign. While the two states had been bound together in personal union since the Union of Krewo (1385), they were politically distinct entities, each with its own laws and institutions. Poland then was more of a homogenous and Catholic society, whereas Lithuania remained multicultural and a predominantly Eastern Orthodox dominion that expanded across vast regions once part of the Kievan Rus. It was also highly decentralised.

Casimir worked to harmonise the interests of the Polish and Lithuanian nobility while also maintaining his position as the supreme ruler of both states. The Tęczyński family often mediated between the crown and the upper class. Their influence ensured that Casimir had strong support within the domestic sphere while advancing his diplomatic agenda abroad. In Lithuania, the Grand Chancellor of Lithuania, Mikołaj II Radziwiłł, was instrumental in strengthening ties with the Polish Crown while safeguarding Lithuanian autonomy. He was nicknamed "Amor Poloniae" by contemporaries due to his pro-Polish stance and sentiment. Casimir's reign was marked by efforts to enhance cooperation, and he also strived to secure the southern and eastern frontiers, which were constantly threatened by the Crimean Tatars and the Grand Duchy of Moscow.

=== Thirteen Years' War ===
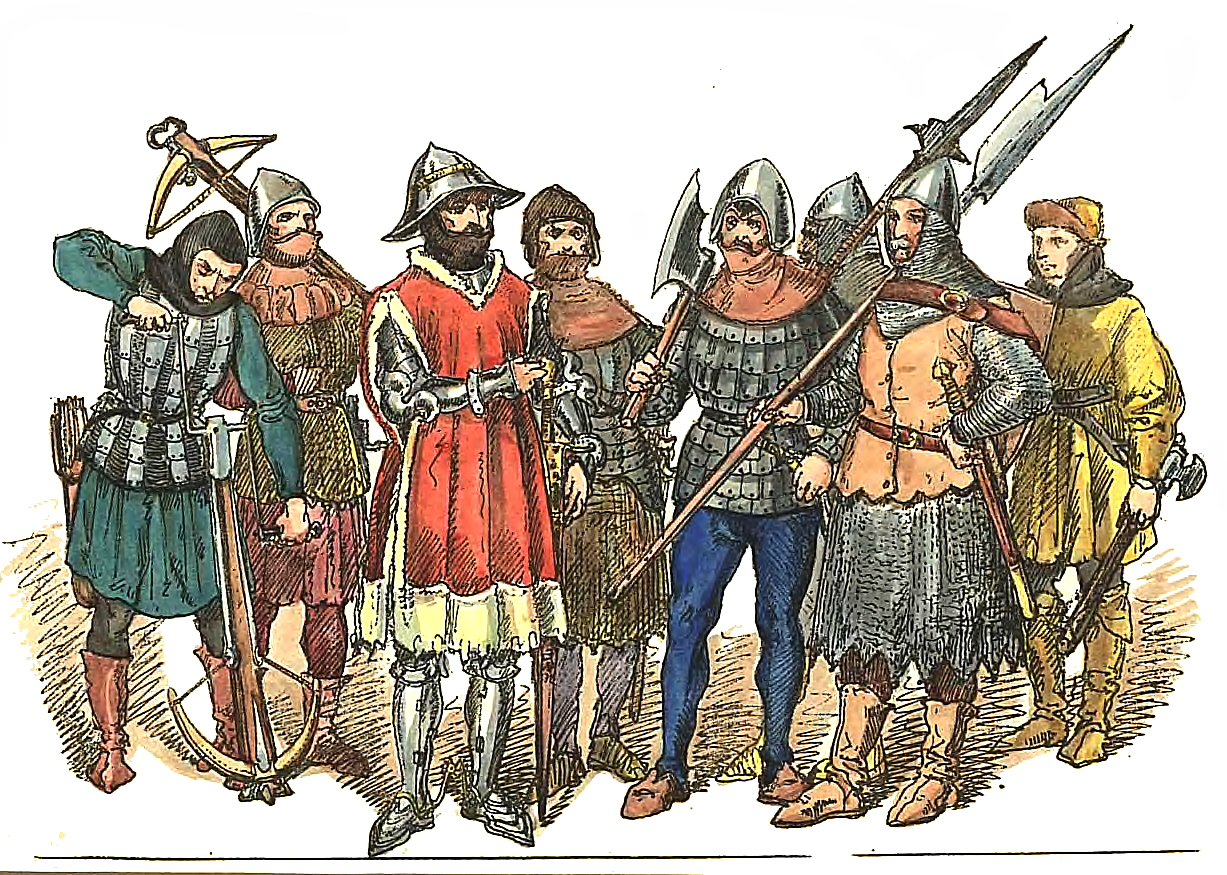
Polish knights and soldiers during the Thirteen Years' War (1454–1466)

In 1454, Casimir was approached by the Prussian Confederation for aid against the Teutonic Order, which he promised, by making the separatist Prussian regions a protectorate of the Polish Kingdom. However, when the insurgent cities rebelled against the Order, it resisted and the Thirteen Years' War (1454–1466) ensued. Beginning in 1457, the Teutonic army from Königsberg unsuccessfully besieged their former seat at Marienburg and lost the nearby town of Marienburg (Malbork) in effect. At the Battle of Świecino (Schlacht bei Schwetzin) in September 1462, the Polish army and hired mercenaries decimated the Teutonic force, simultaneously cutting their future supply routes from Western Europe. A year later, the Teutonic rescue fleet was sunk at the Battle of Vistula Lagoon, resulting in the decisive end of the Teutonic Order's navy. In the Second Peace of Thorn (1466), the declining Order recognised Polish sovereignty over the seceded western Prussian regions, Royal Prussia, and the Polish crown's overlordship over the remaining Teutonic Monastic State. It was transformed following Casimir's death into a duchy, which became known as Ducal Prussia (1525).

=== Foreign relations and diplomacy ===
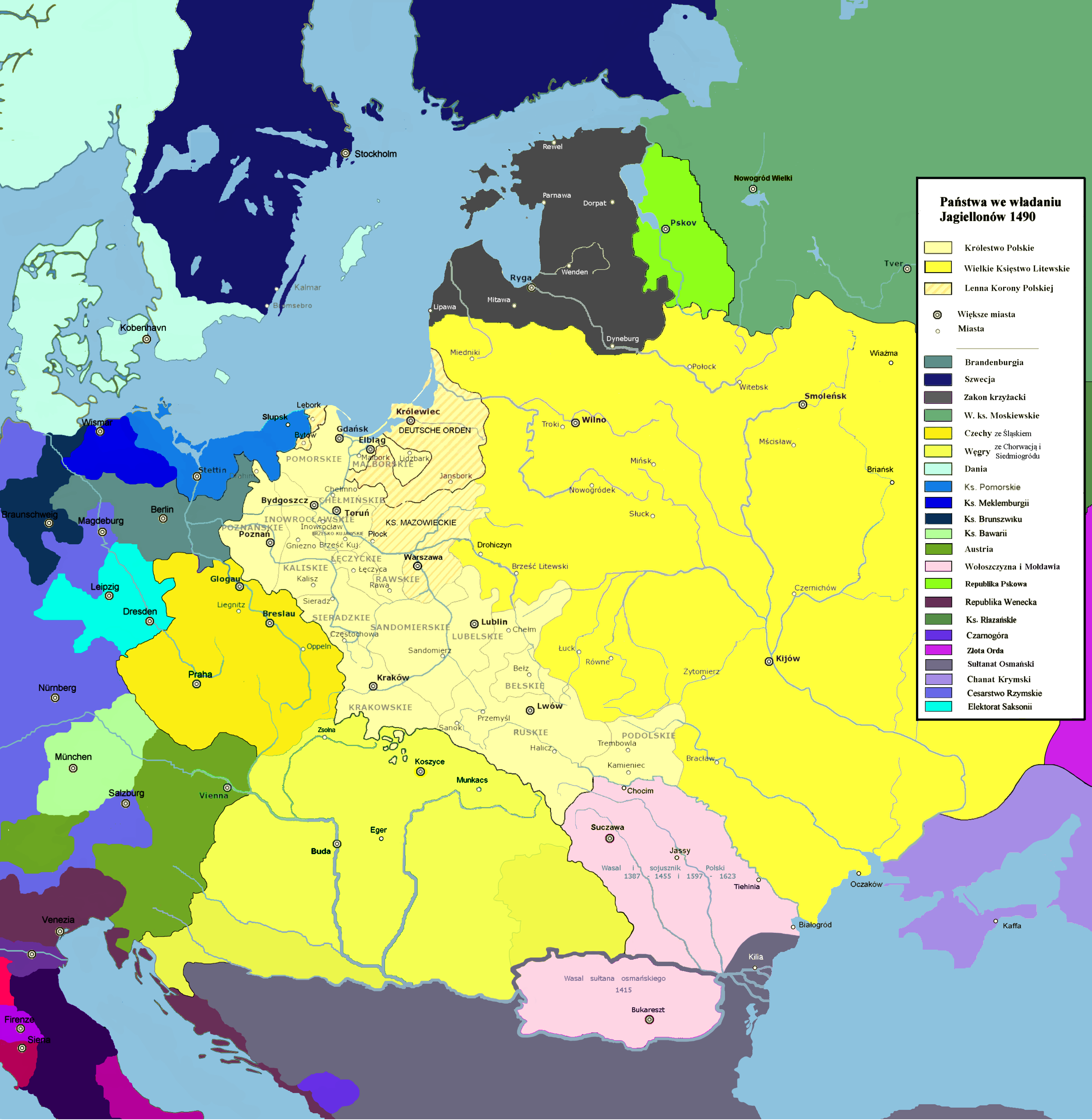
Countries ruled by the Jagiellonian dynasty in 1490

Casimir sought to maintain influential relations with the Habsburgs and the Holy Roman Empire. In 1454, he married Elizabeth of Austria, daughter of King Albert II of Germany and Elizabeth of Luxembourg, a descendant of King Casimir III of Poland. Her distant relative was Frederick III, Holy Roman Emperor. The marriage strengthened the ties between the house of Jagiellon and the sovereigns of Hungary-Bohemia and put Casimir at odds with the emperor through internal Habsburg rivalry. Elisabeth's only brother Ladislaus, king of Bohemia and Hungary died in 1457, and after that, Casimir and Elizabeth's dynastic interests were directed also towards her brother's kingdoms.

The threat from the Ottoman Empire, which was expanding rapidly in the Balkans and along the Black Sea, loomed over Eastern Europe during Casimir's reign. While Poland-Lithuania did not engage directly in military conflict with the Turks, Casimir faced increasing pressure from the Ottomans' allies, including the Crimean Tatars, whose raids intensified. He was, nonetheless, able to maintain a semblance of stability on the eastern border, skillfully negotiating with the Muscovites and the Crimean Khanate to avoid full-scale war. His diplomacy helped prevent the dissolution of the Polish-Lithuanian alliance and ensured territorial integrity. In around 1480, Casimir was allied with the Great Horde against Muscovy and Crimea; however, his failure to support Khan Akhmed at the Great stand on the Ugra River contributed to Russia gaining its independence from the steppe nomads.

The intervention of the Roman curia, which hitherto had been hostile to Casimir, was due to the permutations of European politics. The pope was anxious to get rid of the Hussite King of Bohemia, George Podebrad, as the first step towards the formation of a league against the Ottoman Turks. Casimir was to be a leading factor in this combination, and he took advantage of it to procure the election of his son Vladislaus II as the King of Bohemia. But he would not commit himself too far, and his ulterior plans were frustrated by the rivalry of Matthias Corvinus, King of Hungary, who even went so far as to stimulate the Teutonic Order to rise against Casimir. The death of Matthias in 1490 was a great relief to Poland, and Casimir employed the two remaining years of his reign in consolidating his position still further.

In 1490, Casimir's son John Albert was elected the King of Hungary by a party among the Hungarian nobles. He was, however, defeated by his older brother, King Vladislaus II of Bohemia. Casimir, who wanted to secure a separate realm for his sons, proposed John Albert. Most Hungarian barons and prelates preferred Vladislaus because his rule in Bohemia had indicated that he would respect their liberties. Vladislaus was crowned King of Hungary on 18 September 1490 in Székesfehérvár.

== Personal life and appearance ==
According to the Chronica Polonorum by Maciej Miechowita, Casimir was of tall stature and completely bald at the mid-frontal point (advanced receding hairline); his face was oval and lean. Miechowita also writes that the king spoke with a speech impairment (lisp) and was an avid huntsman from his youth. He often hunted in the primeval tranquil woodlands extending over the Grand Duchy of Lithuania, which were abundant in game. Casimir appeared modest and did not exude a sense of pride, but is said to have enjoyed occasional opulence and splendor for significant conventions. At times, his lack of frugality and preference for field sports over the affairs of state were met with staunch disapproval. Records show that the king was fond of birthday celebrations for his children and watched tournaments. He was also known to be a teetotaller, and abstained from drinking wine, mead or beer at banquets. Historian Julian Bartoszewicz described the king as "wise [in thought], driven by reason and characterised by longanimity and forbearance". Casimir cared deeply for his children's education and employed the finest tutors, chiefly Jan Długosz, to supervise his sons John Albert and Alexander. It is likely that Casimir was Poland's last illiterate monarch as there are no surviving signatures, initials or monograms present on official edicts, though this claim is disputed.

== Tomb ==
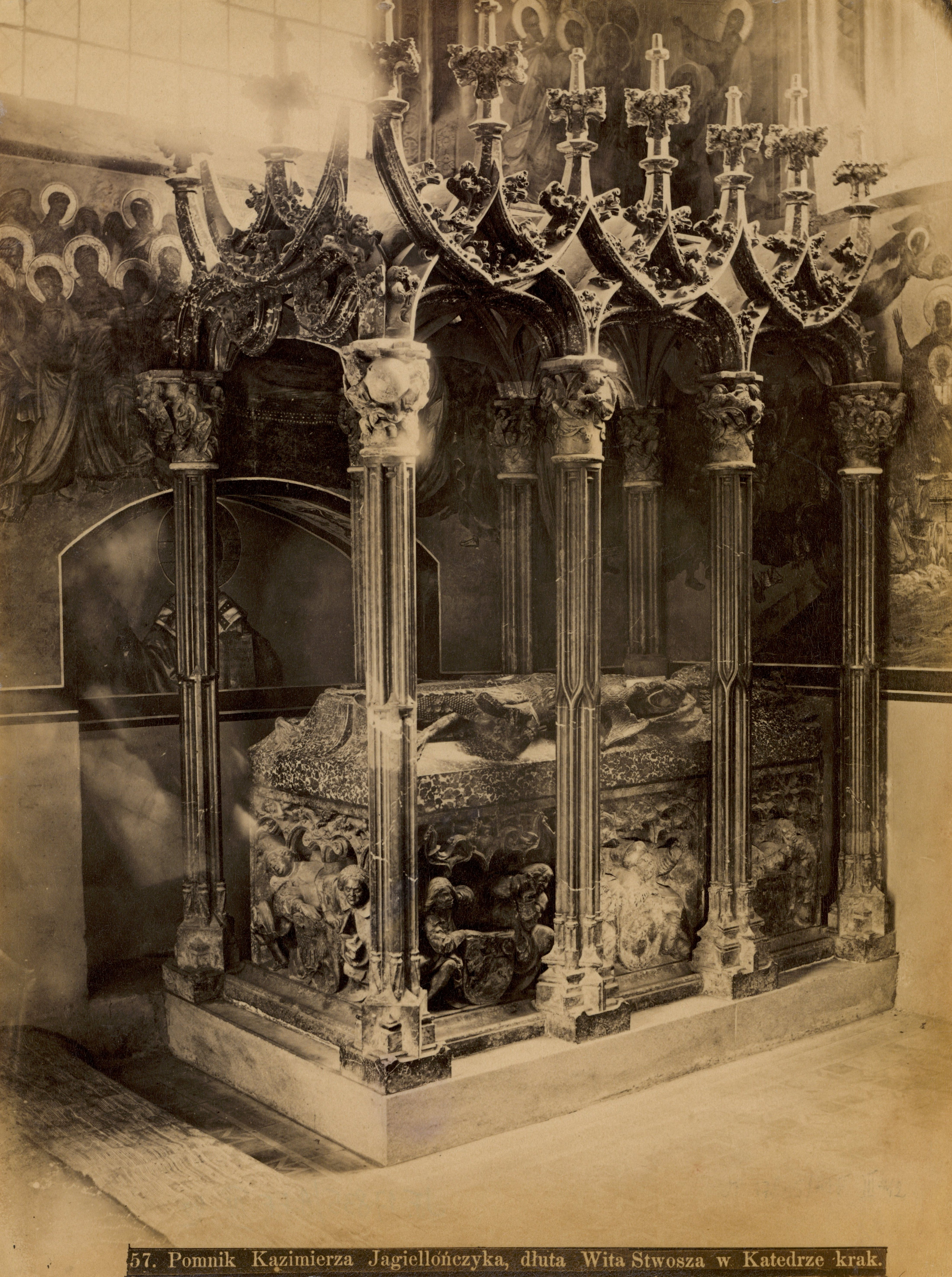
Tomb of Casimir IV in the Wawel Cathedral, late Gothic masterpiece by Veit Stoss.The Byzantine-Ruthenian frescoes visible in the background of the tomb

Casimir IV continued the cultural policy of his father, Jogaila. He commissioned the construction of the Holy Cross Chapel at Wawel Cathedral, adorned by Byzantine-Ruthenian frescoes from 1470. Casimir was interred in the Chapel, in a red marble tomb sculpted by Veit Stoss. In 1973 a research team of 12 experts opened the tomb. Shortly afterwards, 10 of the team died prematurely. It was subsequently found that the deaths were caused by toxins originating from the fungus present in the tomb.

== Children ==
Casimir and Elizabeth had:

1. Vladislaus (1 March 1456 – 13 March 1516); combined the thrones of Hungary and Bohemia as Vladislaus II;
2. Hedwig Jagiellon (21 September 1457 – 18 February 1502); married George the Rich, of the Wittelsbach dynasty of Bavaria. Delegates had gone to Kraków to negotiate the marriage, and their "Landshut Wedding" took place in Bavaria with much pomp and celebration in 1475, starting a tradition which continues to this day;
3. Casimir Jagiellon (3 October 1458 – 4 March 1484); was to have married Kunigunde of Austria, but instead chose religious life, eventually being canonised as Saint Casimir;
4. John I of Poland (27 December 1459 – 17 June 1501); succeeded Casimir IV as the king of Poland (1492–1501);
5. Alexander I of Poland (5 August 1461 – 19 August 1506); King of Poland (1501–1506);
6. Sophie (6 May 1464 – 5 October 1512); married to Margrave Frederick V of Brandenburg-Ansbach;
7. Sigismund I the Old (1 January 1467 – 1 April 1548); King of Poland (1506–1548);
8. Frederick Jagiellon (27 April 1468 – 14 March 1503); Bishop of Kraków (1488–1503), Archbishop of Gniezno and Primate of Poland (1493–1503);
9. Anna Jagiellon (12 March 1476 – 12 August 1503); married Bogislaw X, Duke of Pomerania; they had eight children, including Sophie of Pomerania, who became queen of Denmark;
10. Barbara (15 July 1478 – 15 February 1534); married George, Duke of Saxony;
11. Elizabeth Jagiellon (13 November 1482 – 16 February 1517); married Frederick II of Legnica;
12. Two additional daughters named Elizabeth.

== Gallery ==
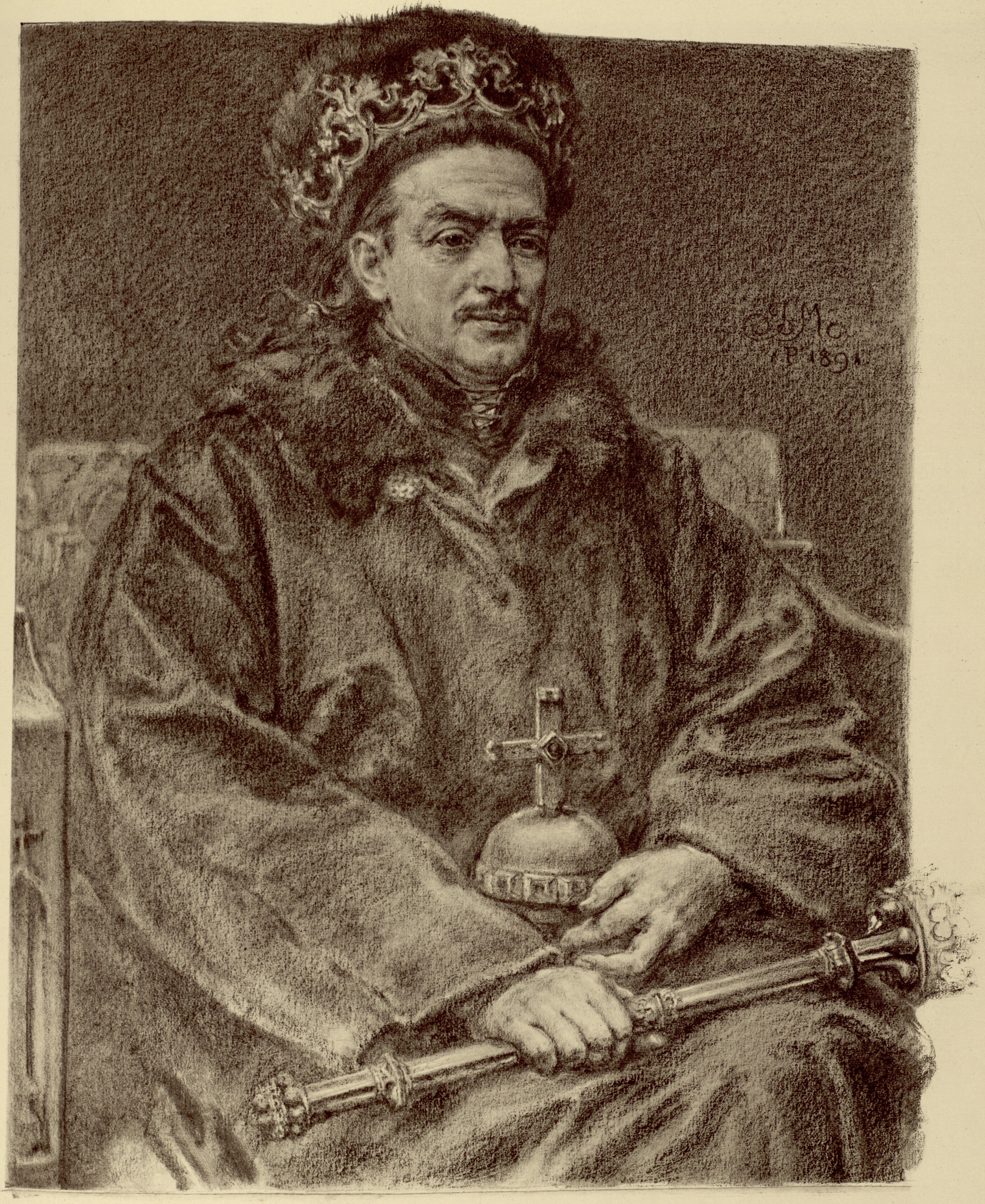
Casimir IV in advanced age, by Jan Matejko

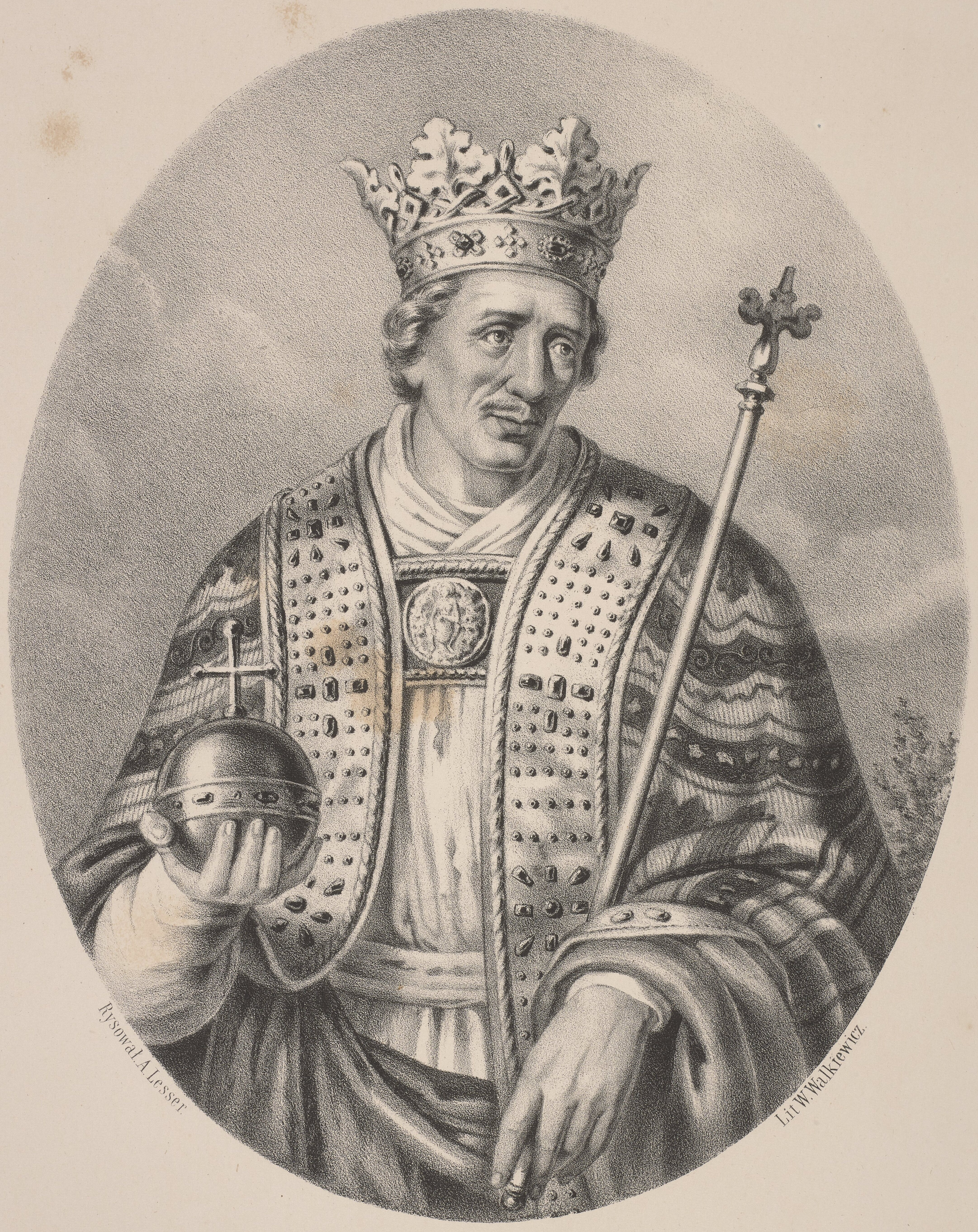
Portrait of King Casimir, by Aleksander Lesser, 1860

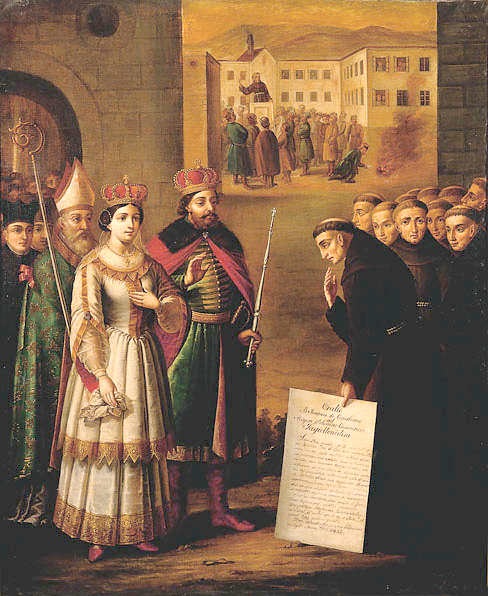
Giovanni da Capistrano and King Casimir IV

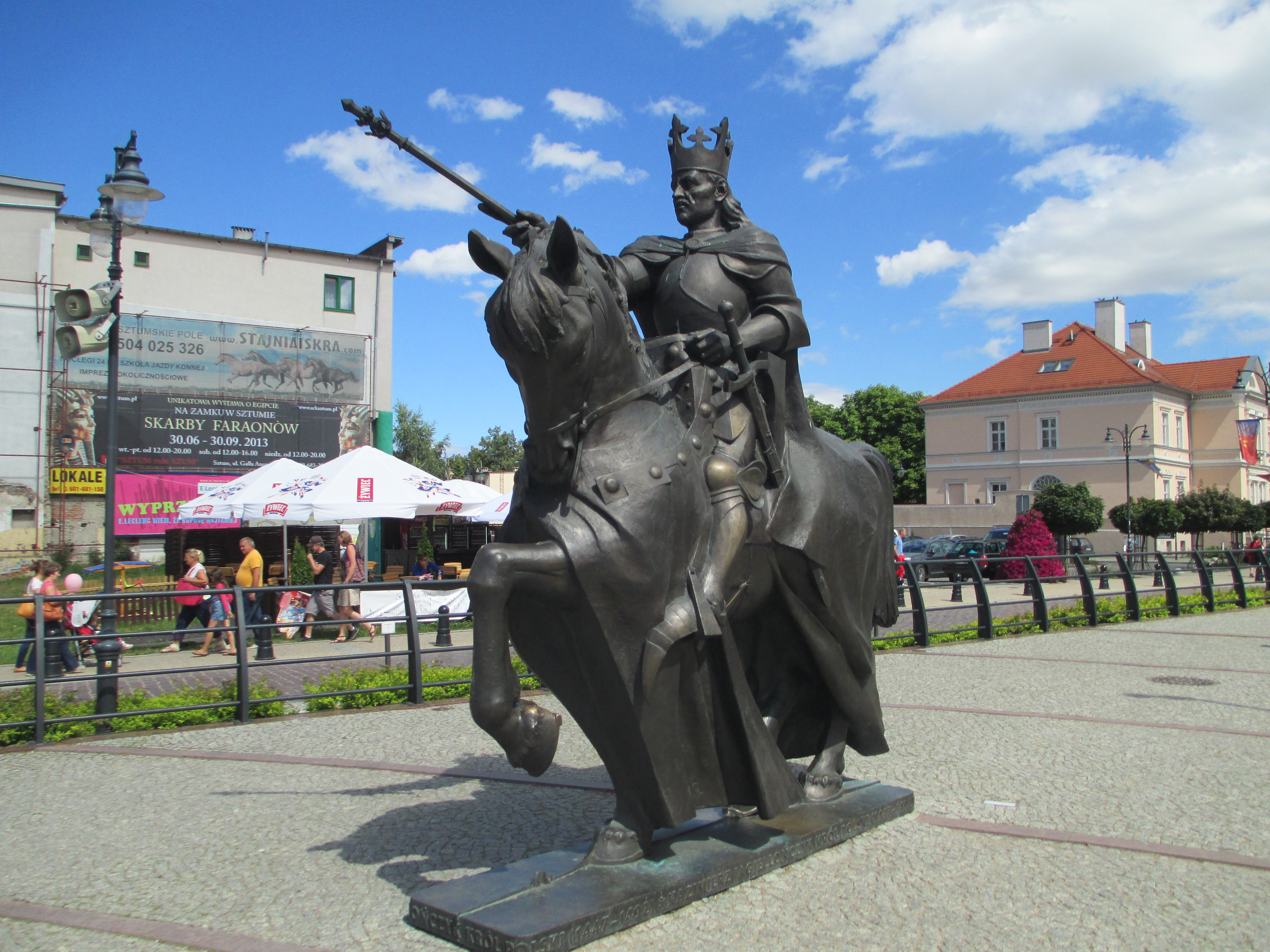
Statue of Casimir IV Jagiellon in Malbork

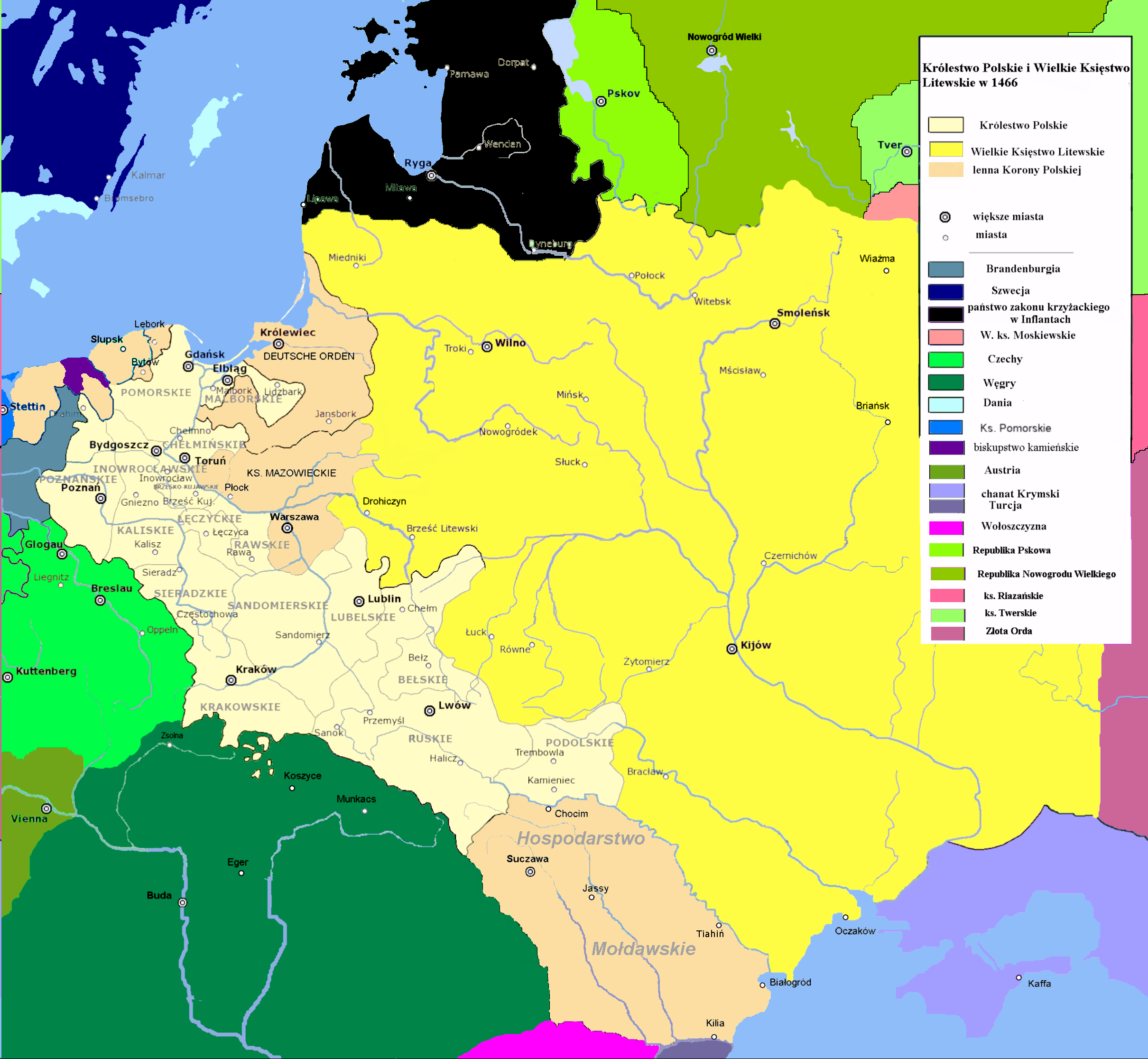
Poland and Lithuania in 1466, under Casimir's rule

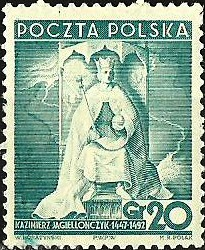
Polish stamp, 1938

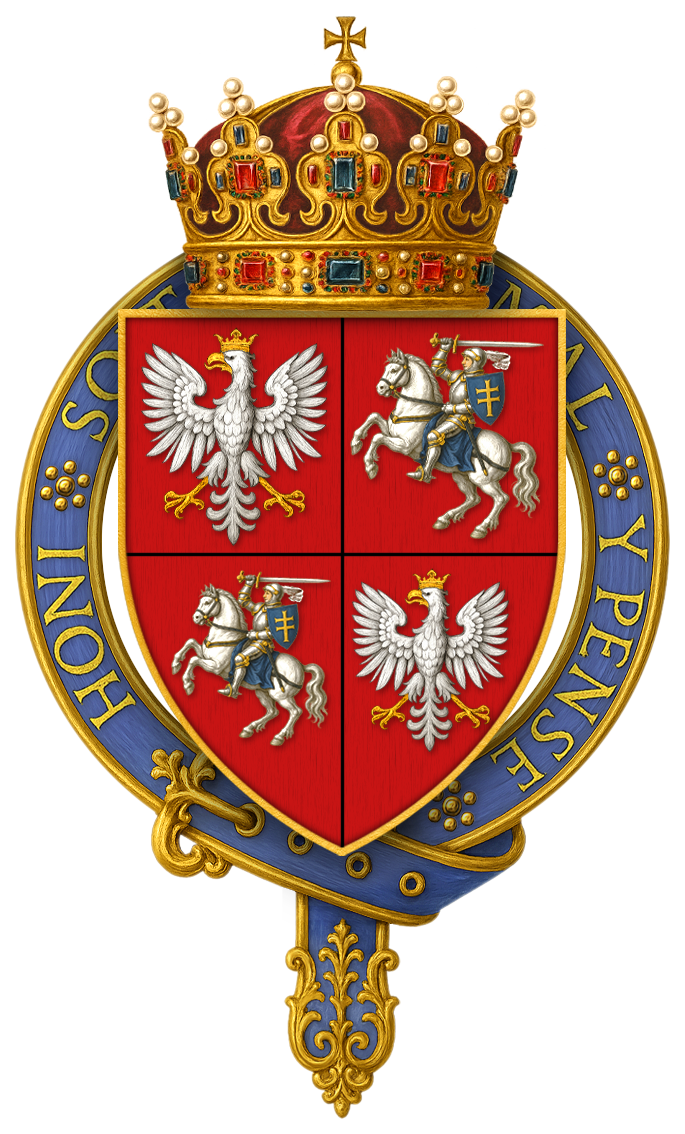
Garter-Encircled Arms of Casimir IV, King of Poland, KG

== See also ==
- History of Poland during the Jagiellonian dynasty
- History of Lithuania
- History of Belarus
- List of Poles
- Statutes of Nieszawa

== Bibliography ==
- Biskup, Marian; Górski, Karol (1987). Kazimierz Jagiellończyk (in Polish). Warszawa (Warsaw): PWN. ISBN 9788301072919.
- Bogucka, Maria (1978). Kazimierz Jagiellończyk (in Polish). Warszawa (Warsaw): Książka i Wiedza. OCLC 831031178.
- Encyklopedia powszechna (in Polish). Vol. 14. Warszawa (Warsaw): S. Orgelbrand. 1863. OCLC 835929692.
- Frost, Robert (2015). The Making of the Polish-Lithuanian Union 1385–1569, Volume 1. Oxford: Oxford University Press. ISBN 9780198208693.
- Kowalska, Zofia (1993). Stanisław Ciołek, podkanclerzy królewski, biskup poznański, poeta dworski (in Polish). Kraków: Universitas. ISBN 9788370521813.
- Kuropieska, Józef (1992). Od października do marca (in Polish). Vol. 1. Warszawa (Warsaw): BGW. ISBN 9788370662172.
- Nowakowska, Natalia, ed. (2019). Remembering the Jagiellonians. Routledge. ISBN 978-1-138-56239-4.
- Samsonowicz, Henryk (2007). Historia Polski (in Polish). Vol. 1. Warszawa (Warsaw): PWN. ISBN 9788301150389.
- Ward, A. W.; Prothero, G. W.; Leathes, Stanley, eds. (1934). The Cambridge Modern History. Vol. XIII. Cambridge University Press.

Preceded by Władysław III of Poland and Sigismund Kestutian	Grand Duke of Lithuania with Władysław III of Poland as Supreme Duke (1340–1344); 1440 – 1492	Succeeded by John I Albert and Alexander
Preceded by Władysław III	King of Poland; 1447 – 1492	Succeeded by John I Albert
