= Kamienna, Kutno County =

Kamienna
- Village
- Location within Poland
- Coordinates: 52°14′31″N 19°30′21″E
- Country: Poland
- Voivodeship: Łódź
- County: Kutno
- Gmina: Oporów

Kamienna [kaˈmjɛnna] is a village in the administrative district of Gmina Oporów, within Kutno County, Łódź Voivodeship, in central Poland.
