= Wojciech Jastrzębiec =

Polish mediaeval politician and religious leader

His Excellency Wojciech Jastrzębiec
- Archbishop of Gniezno; Primate of Poland
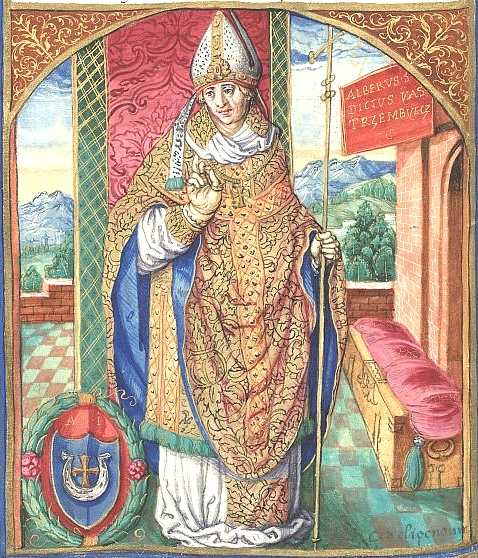
- Church: Roman Catholic
- Archdiocese: Gniezno
- Installed: 1423
- Term ended: 1436

Orders
- Ordination: 1384
- Consecration: 1399

Personal details
- Born: 1362 Łubnice
- Died: 2 September 1436 (aged 73–74) Mnichowice
- Buried: Beszowa
- Coat of arms

Wojciech of Jastrzębiec (c. 1362–1436) was a Polish mediaeval politician and religious leader. A bishop of Cracow and Poznań, he also held prominent posts at the court of the king Władysław II of Poland.

Initially a chancellor to king Jadwiga of Poland and one of the advisors to the king Władysław, on 26 April 1399 he was ordained an archbishop of Gniezno and hence Primate of Poland. However, he gave up that post on the king's insistence.

Wojciech authored numerous religious works and became the person to crown king Władysław III of Poland in the Wawel Cathedral on 25 July 1434.

Catholic Church titles
Preceded by Mikołaj II Trąba	Primate of Poland; Archbishop of Gniezno; 1423–1436	Succeeded by Wincenty Kot
