= Gmina Oporów =

Gmina Oporów Oporów Commune
- Gmina
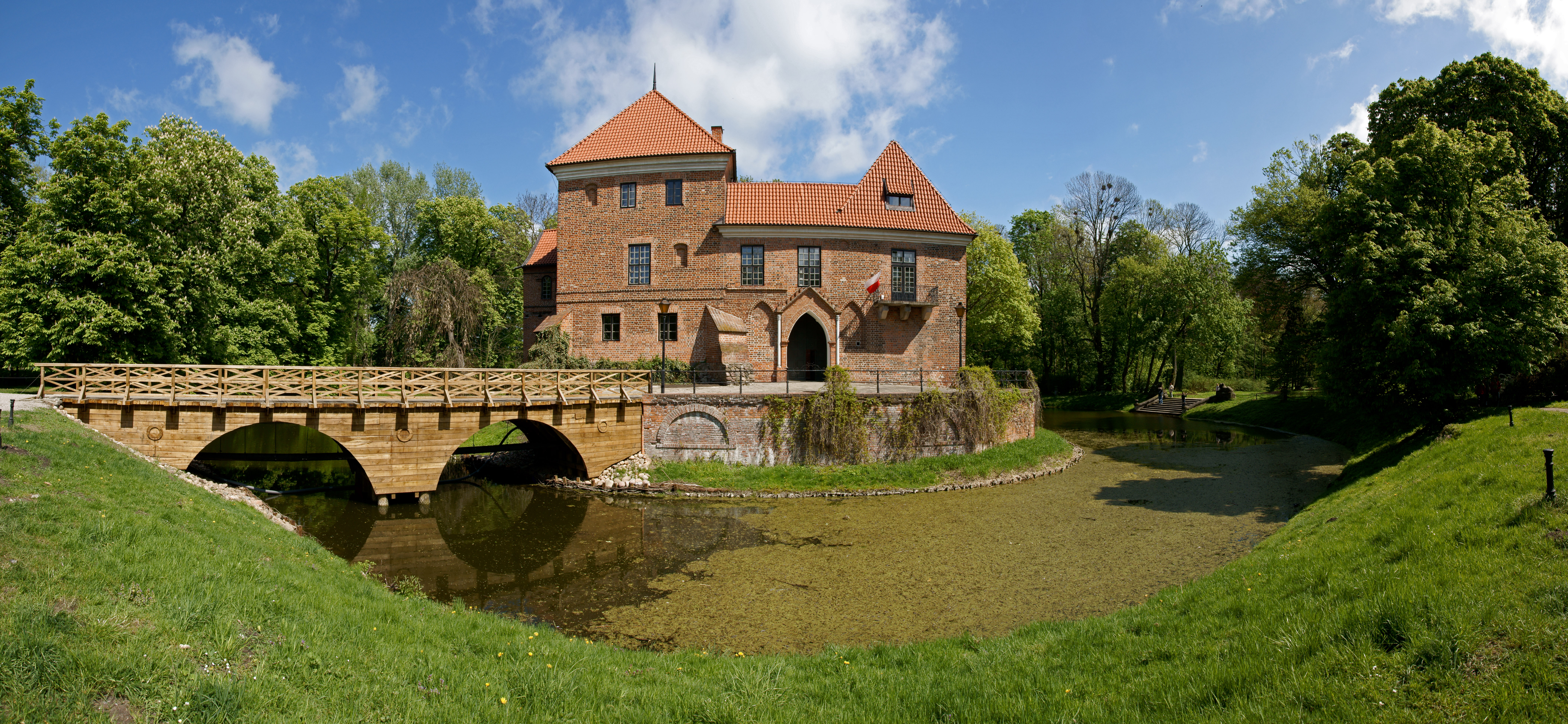

- Coat of arms
- Interactive map of Gmina Oporów
- Coordinates (Oporów): 52°15′N 19°34′E
- Country: Poland
- Voivodeship: Łódź
- County: Kutno
- Seat: Oporów

Area
  - Total: 67.7 km^{2} (26.1 sq mi)

Population (2006)
  - Total: 2,753
  - Density: 40.7/km^{2} (105/sq mi)
- Website: www.oporow.pl

Gmina Oporów is a rural gmina (administrative district) in Kutno County, Łódź Voivodeship, in central Poland. Its seat is the village of Oporów, which lies 14 kilometres (9 mi) east of Kutno and 53 km (33 mi) north of the regional capital Łódź.

Spanning an area of 67.7 square kilometres (26.1 sq mi), as of 2006 the total population of the gmina was 2,753.

== Villages ==
Gmina Oporów contains the villages and settlements of:

- Golędzkie
- Janów
- Jastrzębia
- Jaworzyna
- Jurków Drugi
- Jurków Pierwszy
- Kamienna
- Kurów-Parcel
- Kurów-Wieś
- Mnich
- Mnich-Ośrodek
- Mnich-Południe
- Oporów
- Oporów-Kolonia
- Pobórz
- Podgajew
- Samogoszcz
- Skarżyn
- Skórzewa
- Stanisławów
- Świechów
- Szczyt
- Wola Owsiana
- Wola Prosperowa
- Wólka-Lizigódź

== Neighbouring gminas ==
Gmina Oporów is bordered by the gminas of Bedlno, Krzyżanów, Kutno, Pacyna, Strzelce, Szczawin Kościelny and Żychlin.
