= Oporów, Łódź Voivodeship =

Oporów
- Village
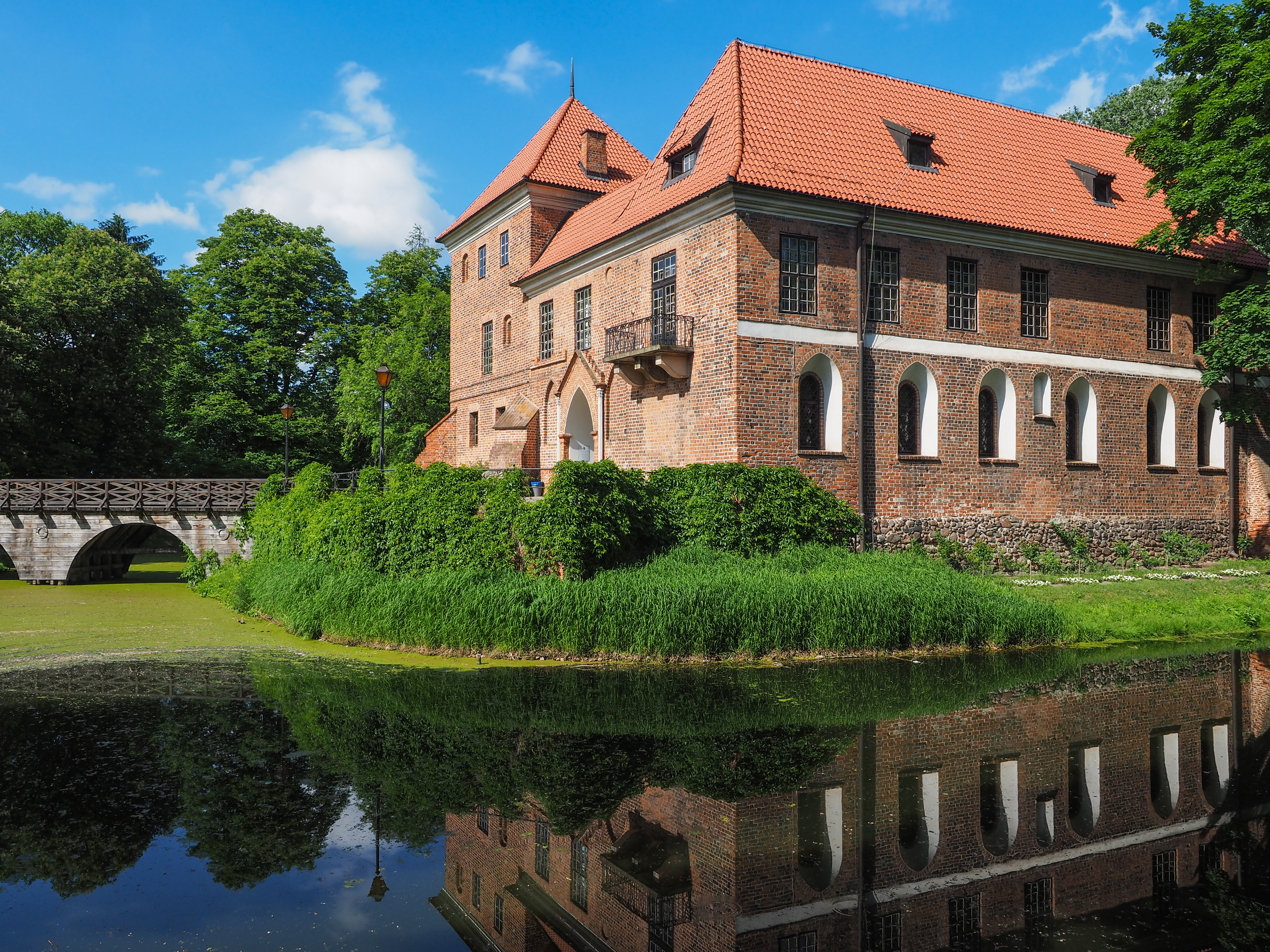
- Oporów Castle

- Coat of arms

- Location within Poland
- Coordinates: 52°15′N 19°34′E
- Country: Poland
- Voivodeship: Łódź
- County: Kutno
- Gmina: Oporów

Population
  - Total: 280

Oporów [ɔˈpɔruf] is a village in Kutno County, Łódź Voivodeship, in central Poland. It is the seat of the gmina (administrative district) called Gmina Oporów. It's 14 km (9 mi) east of Kutno and 53 km (33 mi) north of the regional capital Łódź.

== History ==
Oporów was a private town, administratively located in the Orłów County in the Łęczyca Voivodeship in the Greater Poland Province of the Kingdom of Poland.

A monastery was founded in 1453, which still has a few monks.

The Oporów Castle was constructed in the mid-15th century for defensive purposes.
