= Łódź Voivodeship =

Voivodeship of Poland

Łódź Voivodeship Województwo łódzkie
- Voivodeship
- Flag Coat of arms Brandmark

- Location within Poland

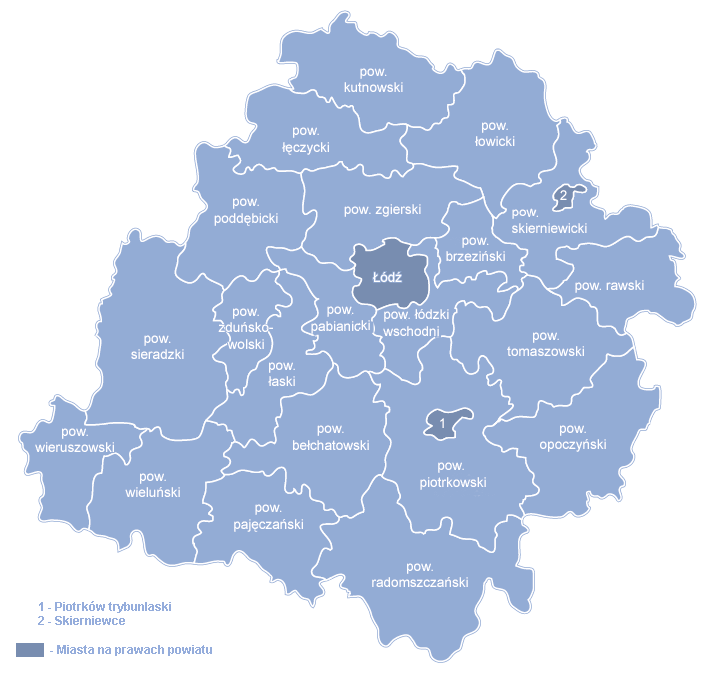
- Division into counties
- Coordinates (Łódź): 51°40′N 19°26′E
- Country: Poland
- Capital: Łódź
- Counties: 3 cities, 21 land counties^{*}: Łódź; Piotrków Trybunalski; Skierniewice; Bełchatów County; Brzeziny County; Kutno County; Łask County; Łęczyca County; Łódź East County; Łowicz County; Opoczno County; Pabianice County; Pajęczno County; Piotrków County; Poddębice County; Radomsko County; Rawa County; Sieradz County; Skierniewice County; Tomaszów County; Wieluń County; Wieruszów County; Zduńska Wola County; Zgierz County

Government
  - Body: Łódź Voivodeship executive board
  - Voivode: Dorota Ryl (PO)
  - Marshal: Joanna Skrzydlewska (PO)
  - EP: Łódź

Area
  - Total: 18,219 km^{2} (7,034 sq mi)

Population (31 December 2021)
  - Total: 2,416,902 ▼
  - Density: 132.66/km^{2} (343.58/sq mi)
  - Urban: 1,499,697 ▼
  - Rural: 917,205 ▼

GDP
  - Total: €50.902 billion (2024)
  - Per capita: €22,016 (2024)
- Time zone: UTC+1 (CET)
  - Summer (DST): UTC+2 (CEST)
- ISO 3166 code: PL-10
- Vehicle registration: E
- HDI (2019): 0.875 very high · 7th
- Website: www.lodzkie.pl
- ^{*}Further divided into 177 gminas

Łódź Voivodeship (Polish: województwo łódzkie [vɔjɛˈvut͡stfɔ ˈwut͡skʲɛ]) is a voivodeship (province) of Poland. The province is named after its capital and largest city, Łódź (pronounced [wut͡ɕ]).

Łódź Voivodeship is bordered by six other voivodeships: Masovian to the north and east, Świętokrzyskie to the south-east, Silesian to the south, Opole to the south-west, Greater Poland to the west, and Kuyavian-Pomeranian for a short stretch to the north. Its territory belongs to three historical provinces of Poland – Masovia (in the east), Greater Poland (in the west) and Lesser Poland (in the southeast, around Opoczno).

== Cities and towns ==
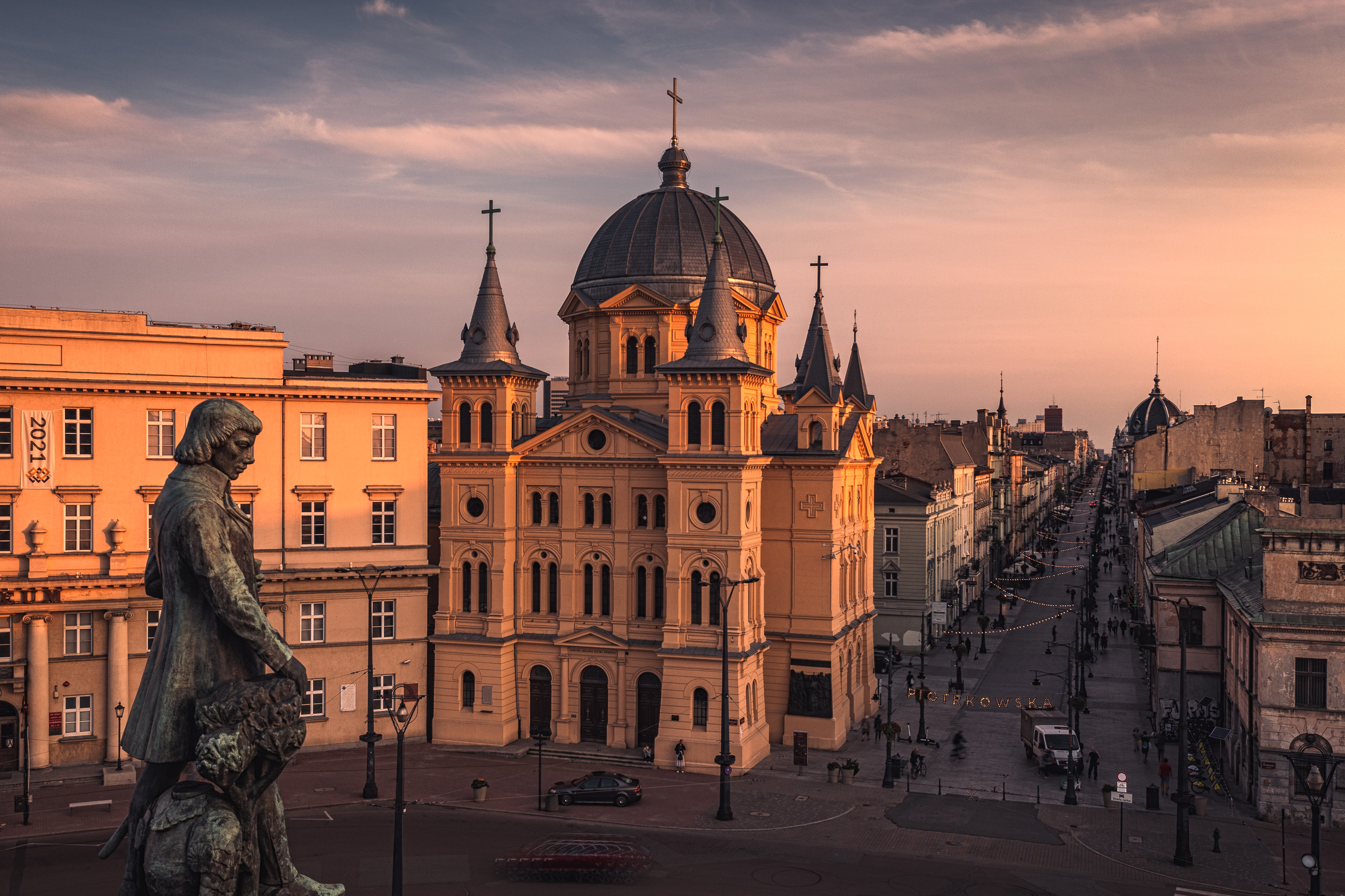
Łódź

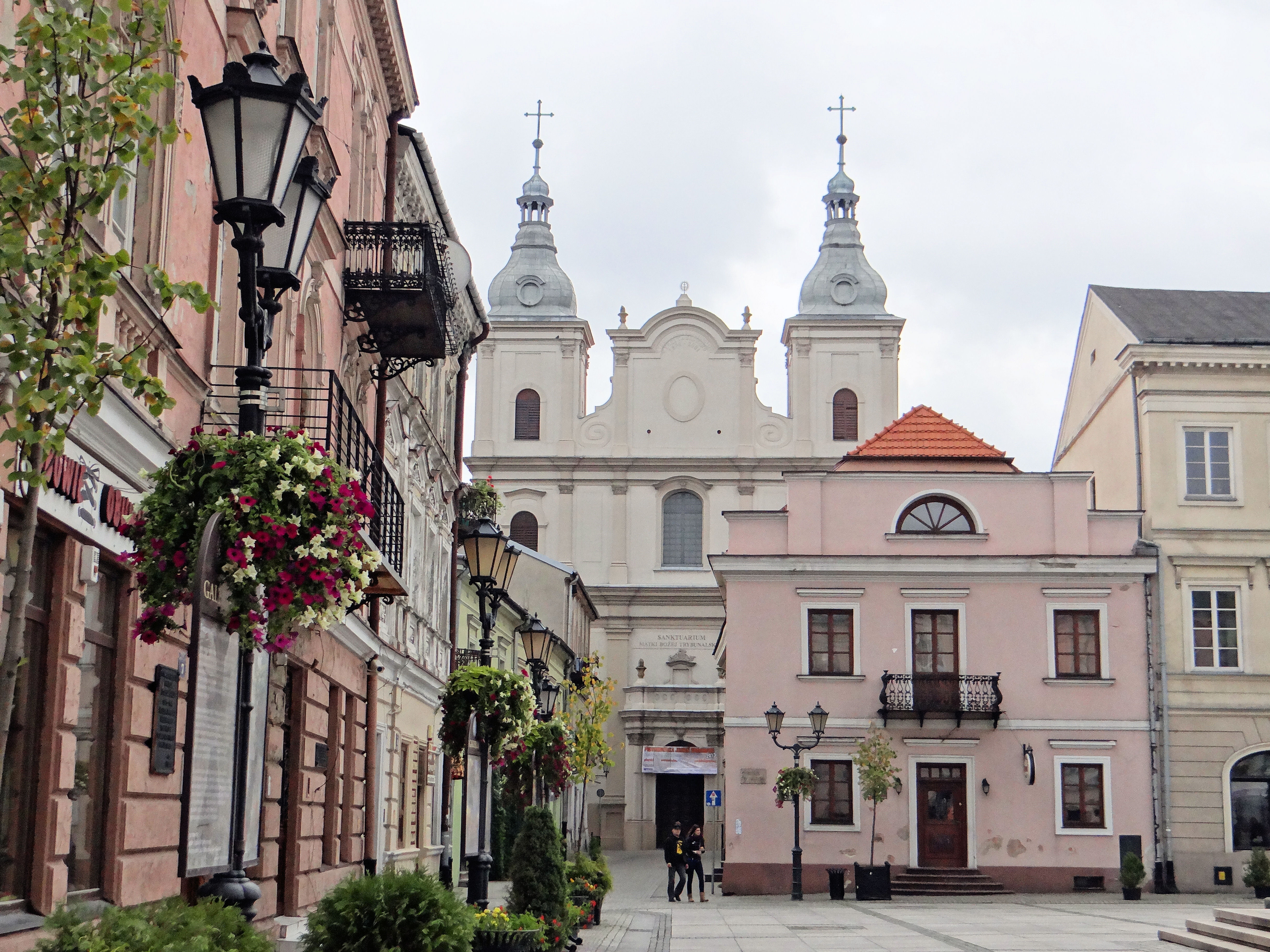
Piotrków Trybunalski

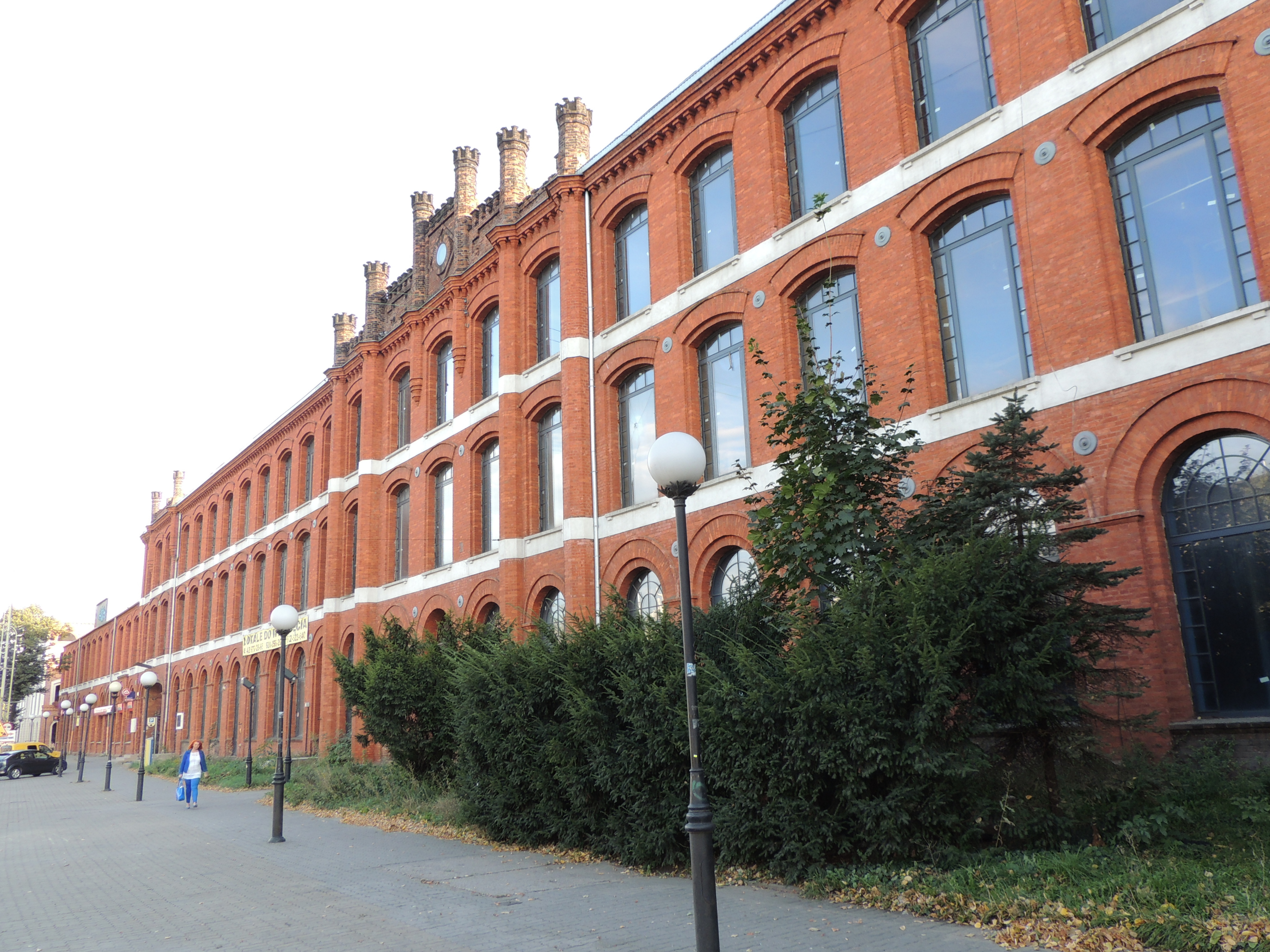
Pabianice

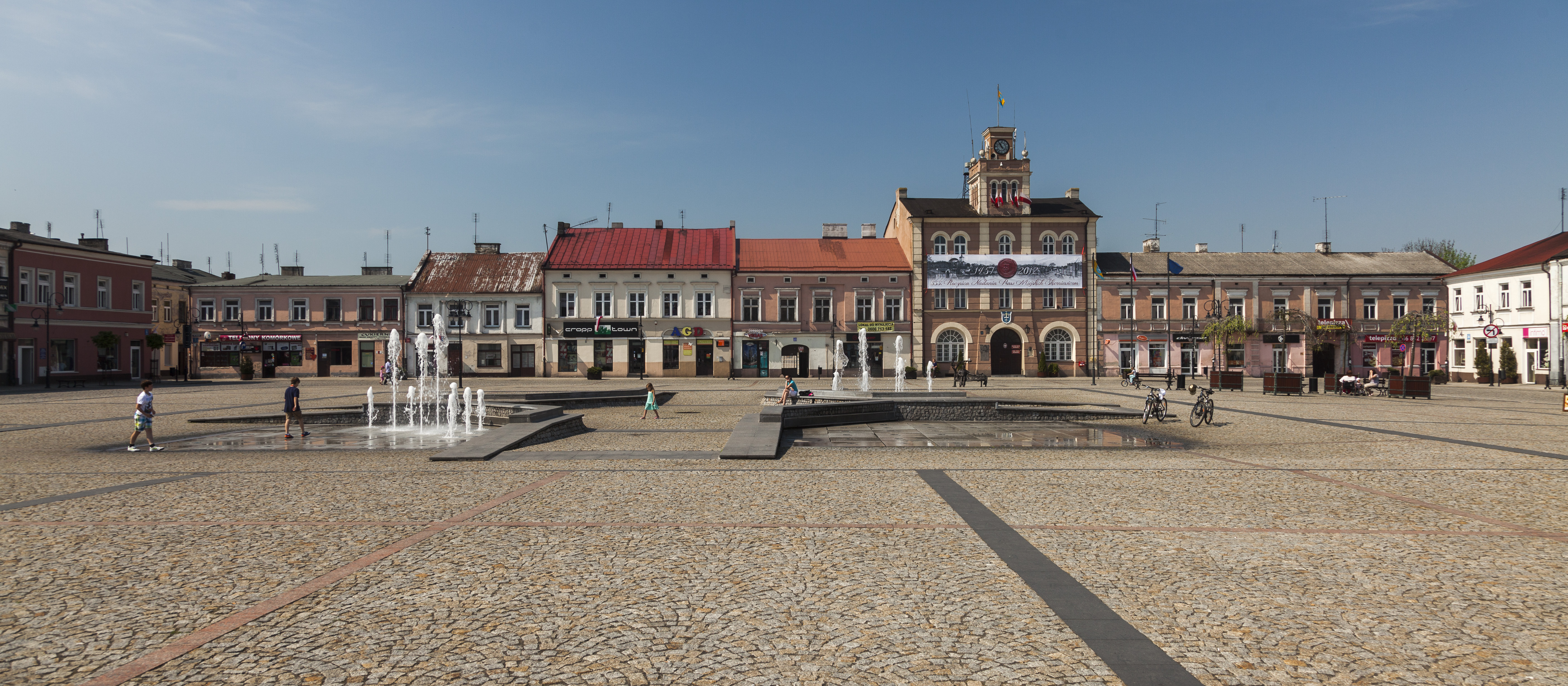
Skierniewice

Historical population
Year	Pop.	±%
1988	2,703,698	—
2002	2,612,890	−3.4%
2011	2,538,677	−2.8%
2021	2,410,286	−5.1%

The voivodeship contains 11 cities and 35 towns. These are listed below in descending order of population (according to official figures for 31 December 2021):

Cities (governed by a city mayor or prezydent miasta):
1. Łódź (664,071) ▼
2. Piotrków Trybunalski (71,252) ▼
3. Pabianice (63,023) ▼
4. Tomaszów Mazowiecki (60,529) ▼
5. Bełchatów (55,583) ▼
6. Zgierz (54,974) ▼
7. Skierniewice (47,031) ▼
8. Radomsko (44,700) ▼
9. Kutno (42,704) ▼
10. Sieradz (40,891) ▼
11. Zduńska Wola (40,730) ▲

Towns:

1. Łowicz (27,436) ▼
2. Aleksandrów Łódzki (21,789) ▲
3. Wieluń (21,624) ▼
4. Opoczno (20,409) ▼
5. Ozorków (18,846) ▼
6. Konstantynów Łódzki (18,533) ▲
7. Rawa Mazowiecka (16,980) ▼
8. Łask (16,687) ▼
9. Głowno (13,727) ▼
10. Łęczyca (13,587) ▼
11. Koluszki (12,687) ▼
12. Brzeziny (12,326) ▼
13. Wieruszów (8,405) ▼
14. Żychlin (7,866) ▼
15. Zelów (7,356) ▼
16. Tuszyn (7,193) ▼
17. Poddębice (7,144) ▼
18. Pajęczno (6,536) ▼
19. Sulejów (6,065) ▼
20. Działoszyn (5,627) ▼
21. Krośniewice (4,208) ▼
22. Drzewica (3,778) ▼
23. Przedbórz (3,406) ▼
24. Stryków (3,376) ▼
25. Rzgów (3,376) ▼
26. Złoczew (3,301) ▼
27. Warta (3,135) ▼
28. Biała Rawska (3,081) ▼
29. Uniejów (2,965) ▲
30. Kamieńsk (2,670) ▼
31. Wolbórz (2,297) ▼
32. Lututów (2,269) ▲
33. Błaszki (1,992) ▼
34. Szadek (1,880) ▼
35. Piątek (1,652) ▼
36. Rozprza
37. Lutomiersk
38. Ujazd
39. Osjaków
40. Jeżów
41. Bolesławiec
42. Żarnów
43. Białaczów
44. Grabów
45. Parzęczew
46. Bolimów
47. Dąbrowice
48. Kiernozia
49. Inowłódz

== Administrative divisions ==
Łódź Voivodeship is divided into 24 counties (powiats): 3 city counties and 21 land counties. These are further divided into 177 gminas.

The counties are listed in the following table (ordered within categories by descending population).

English and Polish names	Area (km²)	Population (31 December 2020)	Seat	Other towns	Total gminas
City counties
Łódź	293	664,071 ▼			1
Piotrków Trybunalski	67	71,252 ▼			1
Skierniewice	33	47,031 ▼			1
Land counties
Zgierz County powiat zgierski	854	165,110 ▼	Zgierz	Ozorków, Aleksandrów Łódzki, Głowno, Stryków, Parzęczew	9
Pabianice County powiat pabianicki	491	118,616 ▼	Pabianice	Konstantynów Łódzki, Lutomiersk	7
Sieradz County powiat sieradzki	1491	115,959 ▼	Sieradz	Złoczew, Warta, Błaszki	11
Tomaszów County powiat tomaszowski	1026	114,620 ▼	Tomaszów Mazowiecki	Inowłódz, Ujazd	11
Bełchatów County powiat bełchatowski	969	111,784 ▼	Bełchatów	Zelów	8
Radomsko County powiat radomszczański	1443	110,584 ▼	Radomsko	Przedbórz, Kamieńsk	14
Kutno County powiat kutnowski	886	94,363 ▼	Kutno	Żychlin, Krośniewice, Dąbrowice	11
Piotrków County powiat piotrkowski	1429	90,727 ▼	Piotrków Trybunalski *	Sulejów, Wolbórz, Rozprza	11
Łowicz County powiat łowicki	987	76,820 ▼	Łowicz	Kiernozia	10
Wieluń County powiat wieluński	928	75,167 ▼	Wieluń	Osjaków	10
Opoczno County powiat opoczyński	1039	74,867 ▼	Opoczno	Drzewica, Żarnów, Białaczów	8
Łódź East County powiat łódzki wschodni	499	72,856 ▲	Łódź *	Koluszki, Tuszyn, Rzgów	6
Zduńska Wola County powiat zduńskowolski	369	65,568 ▼	Zduńska Wola	Szadek	4
Pajęczno County powiat pajęczański	804	50,461 ▼	Pajęczno	Działoszyn	8
Łask County powiat łaski	617	49,533 ▼	Łask		5
Łęczyca County powiat łęczycki	774	48,715 ▼	Łęczyca	Piątek, Grabów	8
Rawa County powiat rawski	647	47,952 ▼	Rawa Mazowiecka	Biała Rawska	6
Wieruszów County powiat wieruszowski	576	41,759 ▼	Wieruszów	Lututów, Bolesławiec	7
Poddębice County powiat poddębicki	881	40,612 ▼	Poddębice	Uniejów	6
Skierniewice County powiat skierniewicki	756	37,915 ▼	Skierniewice *	Bolimów	9
Brzeziny County powiat brzeziński	359	30,560 ▼	Brzeziny	Jeżów	5
* seat not part of the county

== Protected areas ==
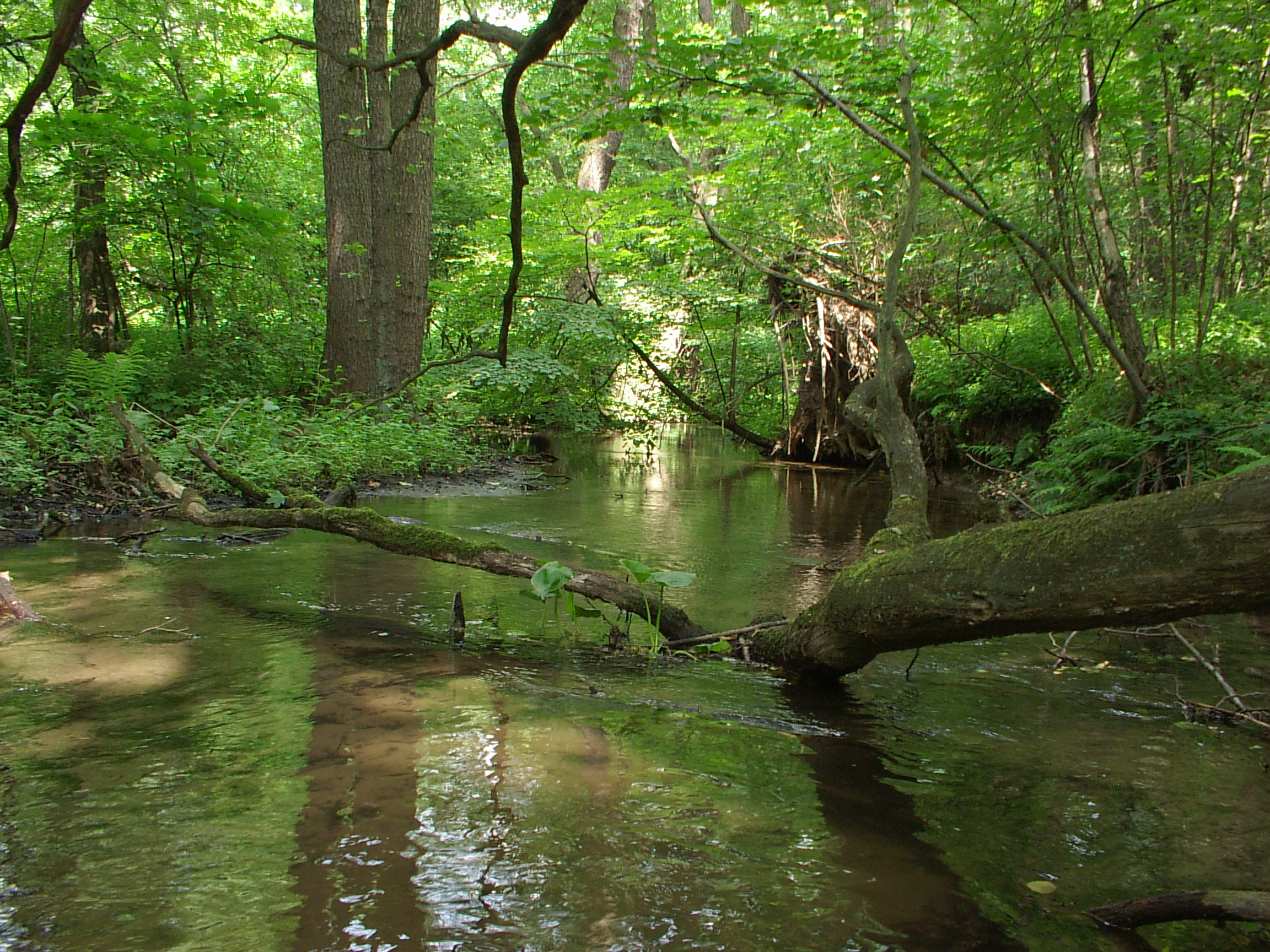
Łódź Hills Landscape Park

Protected areas in Łódź Voivodeship include seven Landscape Parks, as listed below.

- Bolimów Landscape Park (partly in Masovian Voivodeship)
- Łódź Hills Landscape Park
- Przedbórz Landscape Park (partly in Świętokrzyskie Voivodeship)
- Spała Landscape Park
- Sulejów Landscape Park
- Warta-Widawka Landscape Park
- Załęcze Landscape Park (partly in Silesian Voivodeship)

== Economy ==
The gross domestic product (GDP) of the province was 26.7 billion euros in 2018, accounting for 6.0% of Polish economic output. GDP per capita adjusted for purchasing power was 19,800 euros or 66% of the EU27 average in the same year. The GDP per employee was also 66% of the EU average.

== History ==
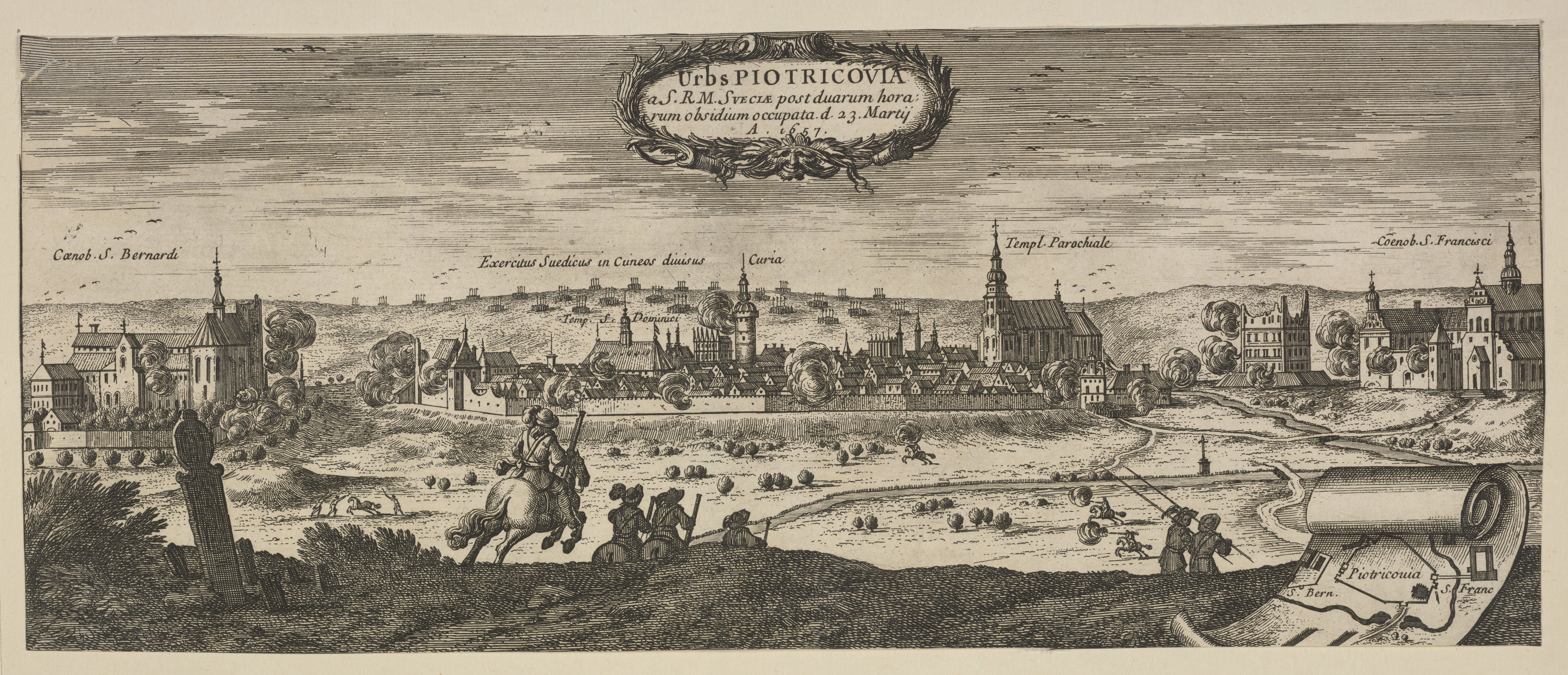
Piotrków Trybunalski in 1657

The territory formed part of Poland since its establishment in the 10th century. The oldest medieval towns in the region include Biała Rawska, Brzeziny, Inowłódz, Łęczyca, Łowicz, Pajęczno, Radomsko, Rozprza, Sieradz, Wolbórz and Żarnów. Łęczyca, Rawa Mazowiecka, Sieradz and Wieluń became medieval ducal seats of the Piast dynasty. The current Łódź Voivodeship is roughly coextensive with the historic Łęczyca Land and Sieradz Land combined, and thus the Łęczyca and Sieradz voivodeships of the former Kingdom of Poland, although it also contains portions of Mazovia (in the north-east) and Lesser Poland (in the south-east). Piotrków Trybunalski, currently the second-largest city of the province, hosted many sessions of the Polish Parliament, the last in 1567, and was the seat of the Crown Tribunal for the Greater Poland Province, the highest appeal court in the Kingdom of Poland. The towns of Ozorków, Aleksandrów Łódzki, Zduńska Wola, Stryków, Konstantynów Łódzki, Zgierz, Tomaszów Mazowiecki, Łódź and Pabianice greatly developed during the Industrial Revolution after textile manufactures were founded there between 1807 and 1823, with Łódź eventually surpassing other towns in the region. Bolimów was the site of the Battle of Bolimów (31 January 1915) during World War I where gas weapons were used for the first time, when the German Army shelled Russian troops with xylyl bromide.

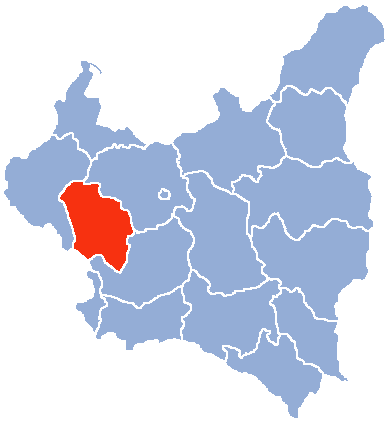
Łódź Voivodeship 1921–1939

The capital of the Łódź Voivodeship has always been Łódź, but the area of land which it comprises has changed several times. The first was a unit of administrative division and local government in the Second Polish Republic in the years 1921–1939. In 1938 some western counties were ceded to Greater Poland Voivodeship (see: Territorial changes of Polish Voivodeships on 1 April 1938).

After the change, Łódź Voivodeship's area was 20,446 square kilometres (7,894 sq mi), and its population (as for 1931) was 2,650,100. It consisted of 15 powiats (counties):

- Brzeziny county,
- Końskie county,
- Kutno county,
- Łask county,
- Łęczyca county,
- Łowicz county,
- city of Łódź county (powiat łódzki grodzki),
- Łódź county,
- Opoczno county,
- Piotrków Trybunalski county,
- Radomsko county,
- Rawa Mazowiecka county,
- Sieradz county,
- Skierniewice county,
- Wieluń county.

The largest cities of the voivodeship were (population according to the 1931 census):

- Łódź (pop. 604,600),
- Piotrków Trybunalski (pop. 51,300),
- Pabianice (pop. 45,700),
- Tomaszów Mazowiecki (pop. 38,000),
- Zgierz (pop. 26,600),
- Kutno (pop. 23,400),
- Radomsko (pop. 23,000).

Source: Mały rocznik statystyczny 1939, Nakładem Glownego Urzędu Statystycznego, Warszawa 1939 (Concise Statistical Year-Book of Poland, Warsaw 1939).

Wieluń was the site of the Bombing of Wieluń conducted by Germany on 1 September 1939, considered the first major bombing of World War II. During the war, the territory was occupied by Germany, with the occupiers committing their genocidal policies against Poles and Jews in the region, with expulsions, kidnapping of children, massacres of civilians and prisoners of war. Germany operated numerous prisons, including the particularly notorious in Łódź and Sieradz, and forced labour camps. The Łódź Ghetto, the second-largest Jewish ghetto in all of German-occupied Europe, was located in Łódź. Warta was the location of Aktion T4 murders of over 500 mentally ill people.

The next incarnation existed from 1945 until 1975 (although the city of Łódź was excluded as a separate City Voivodeship). This Łódź Voivodeship was then broken up, superseded by Łódź (see below), Sieradz, Piotrków Trybunalski, Skierniewice and partly Płock Voivodeships.

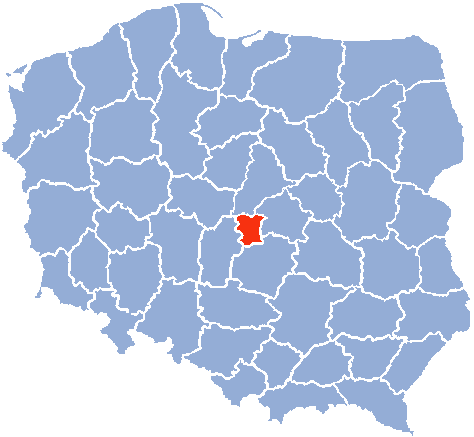
Łódź Voivodeship 1975–1998

Łódź Voivodeship, also known as Łódź Metropolitan Voivodeship (województwo miejskie łódzkie), existed from 1975 until 1998, after which it was incorporated into today's Łódź Voivodeship. Until 1990, the mayor of the city of Łódź was also the voivodeship governor.

As of 1995, major cities and towns in Łódź Metropolitan Voivodeship included (with their 1995 populations):

- Łódź (825,600);
- Pabianice (75,700);
- Zgierz (59,100);
- Ozorków (21,900);
- Aleksandrów Łódzki (20,400).

The current Łódź Voivodeship was created on 1 January 1999 out of the former Łódź Voivodeship (1975–1999) and the Sieradz, Piotrków Trybunalski and Skierniewice Voivodeships and part of Płock Voivodeship, pursuant to the Polish local government reforms adopted in 1998. In July 2025 the voivodeship government purchased offices at the Brama Miasta office building at 66a Kilińskiego street with the intention of consolidating offices which are spread at different locations in the city.

== Culture and education ==
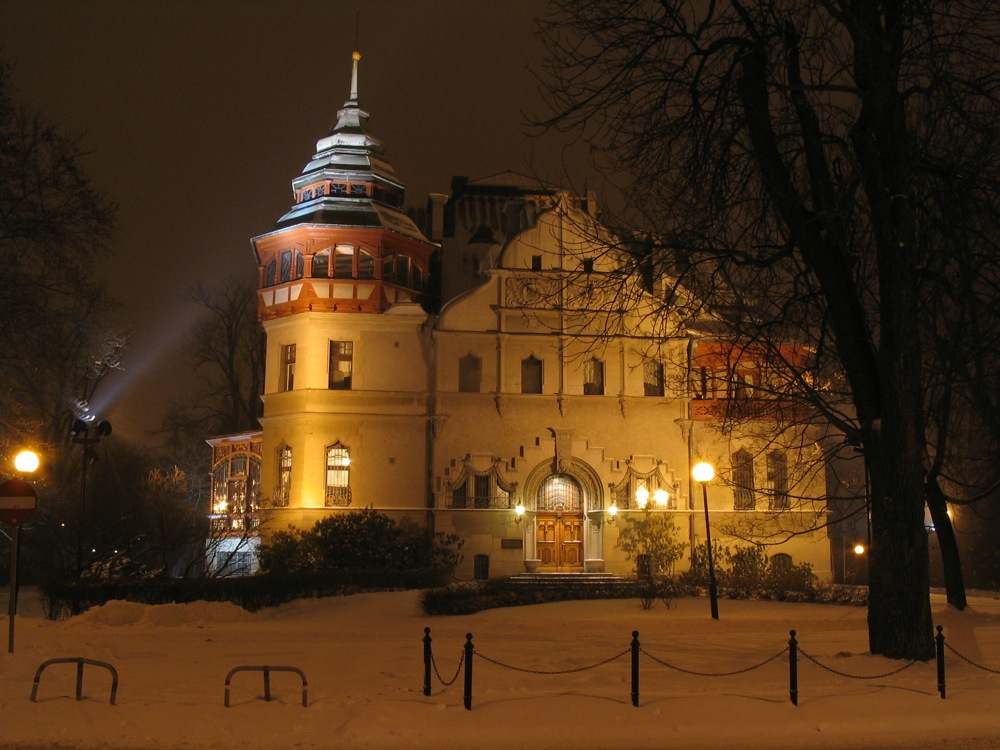
The Rector's Office of the Lodz University of Technology

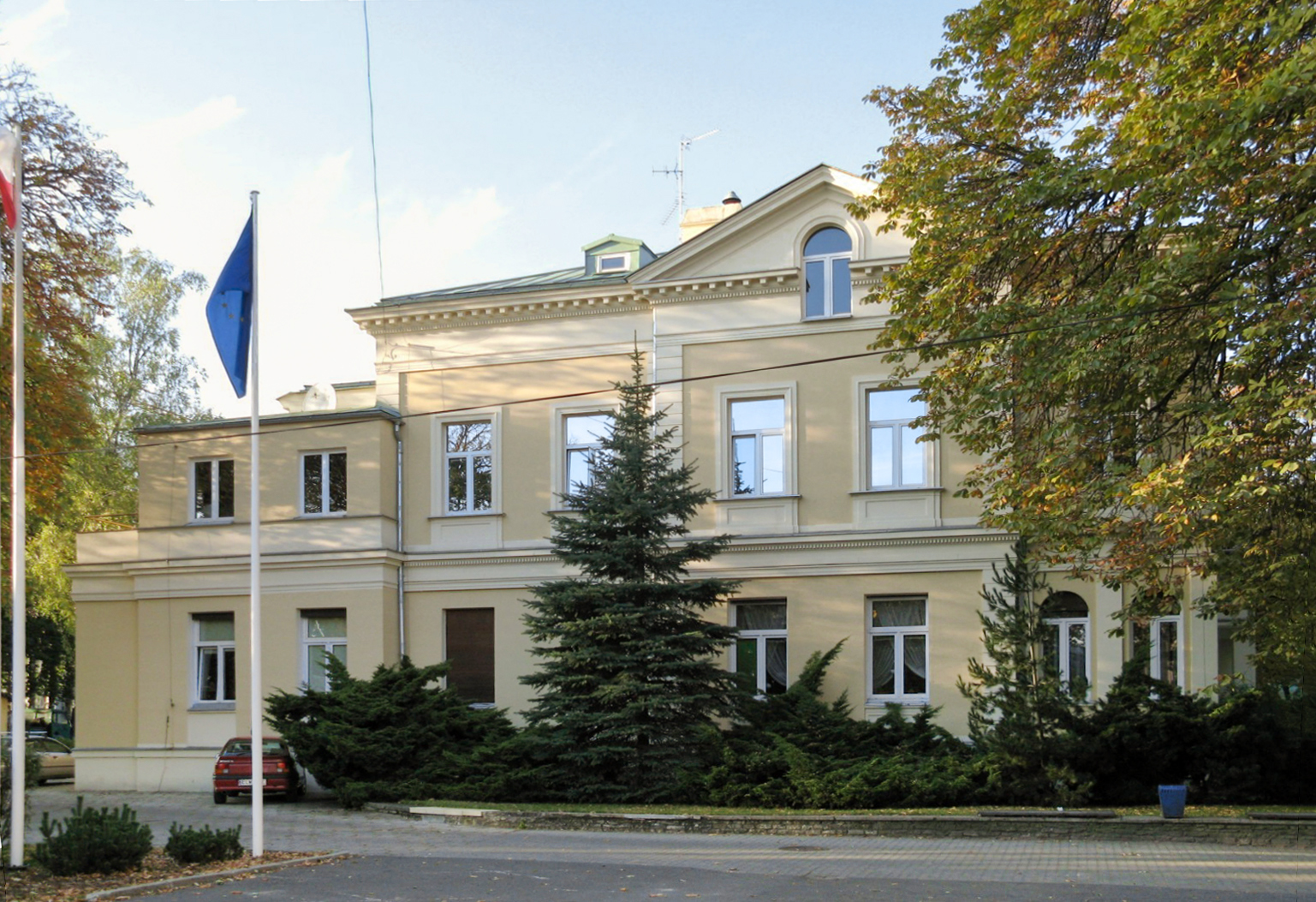
National Film School in Łódź

The basic cultural activities in the Łódź Region are: monitoring activities of seven regional self-government cultural institutions, i.e., the Arthur Rubinstein Łódź Philharmonic, Museum of Art in Łódź (having one of the biggest modern art collections in Europe), the Opera House, Stefan Jaracz Theater, the Museum of Archeology and Ethnography, the Józef Piłsudski Regional and Municipal Public Library in Łódź, the Chamber of Culture in Łódź but also: supporting NGO’s, protection of monuments, awarding scholarships to young artists and rewards for the prominent artists. What is more, infrastructural projects are being undertaken. Among the most important investments are: the creation of four regional scenes in Stefan Jaracz Theatre, opening the new section of the Museum of Art in Łódź - ms² or the reconstruction of medieval settlement in Tum in the vicinity of Łęczyca.

As of 2020, there were 76,897 students in various institutions of higher education in Łódź Voivodeship. The major universities in the voivodeship are:

- University of Łódź
- Lodz University of Technology
- National Film School in Łódź
- Medical University of Łódź
- Higher School of National Economy in Kutno
- Academy of Fine Arts In Łódź
- Jan Kochanowski University in Piotrków Trybunalski

The scientific staff of higher education establishments in Łódź are complemented by scientists from the Institute of the Polish Academy of Sciences (PAN) and scientific ministerial institutes working within the field of occupational medicine, textile, paper and leather industries.

== Sights and tourism ==
There are five Historic Monuments of Poland in the voivodeship:

- Łowicz Cathedral
- Industrial city landscape of Łódź
- Nieborów Palace and park
- Sulejów Abbey
- Tum Collegiate Church

There are multiple either entirely or partly preserved castles in the province, including in Bąkowa Góra, Besiekiery, Bolesławiec, Drzewica, Inowłódz, Łęczyca, Opoczno, Oporów, Piotrków Trybunalski, Uniejów, and multiple palaces, including in Poddębice, Skierniewice, Sokolniki, Walewice, Wola-Chojnata and several in Łódź alone.

The province's sole spa town is Uniejów.

There are numerous World War II memorials, including a museum at the site of the former Nazi German Radogoszcz prison in Łódź, and monuments at the sites of German-perpetrated massacres and camps.

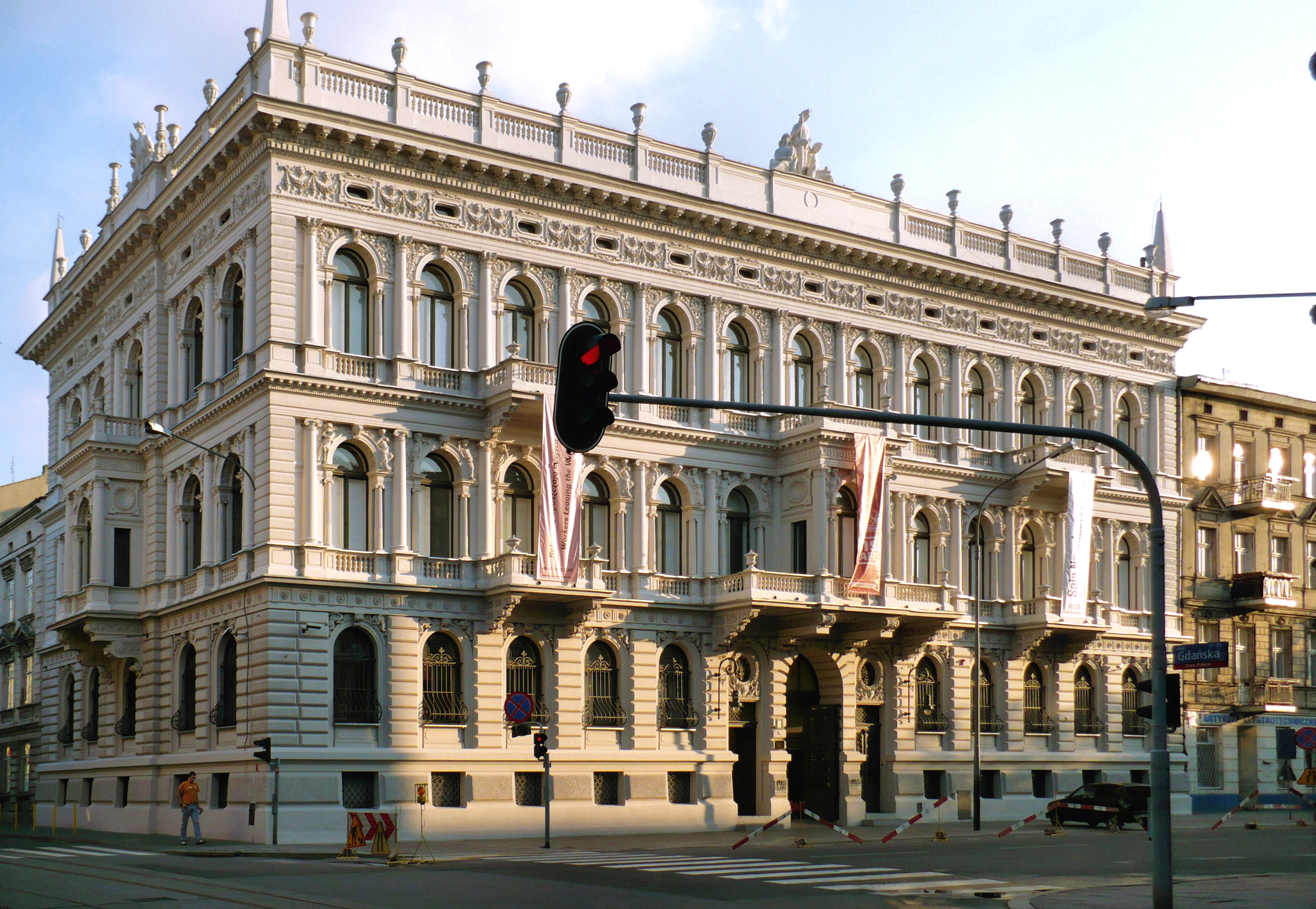
Museum of Art, Łódź

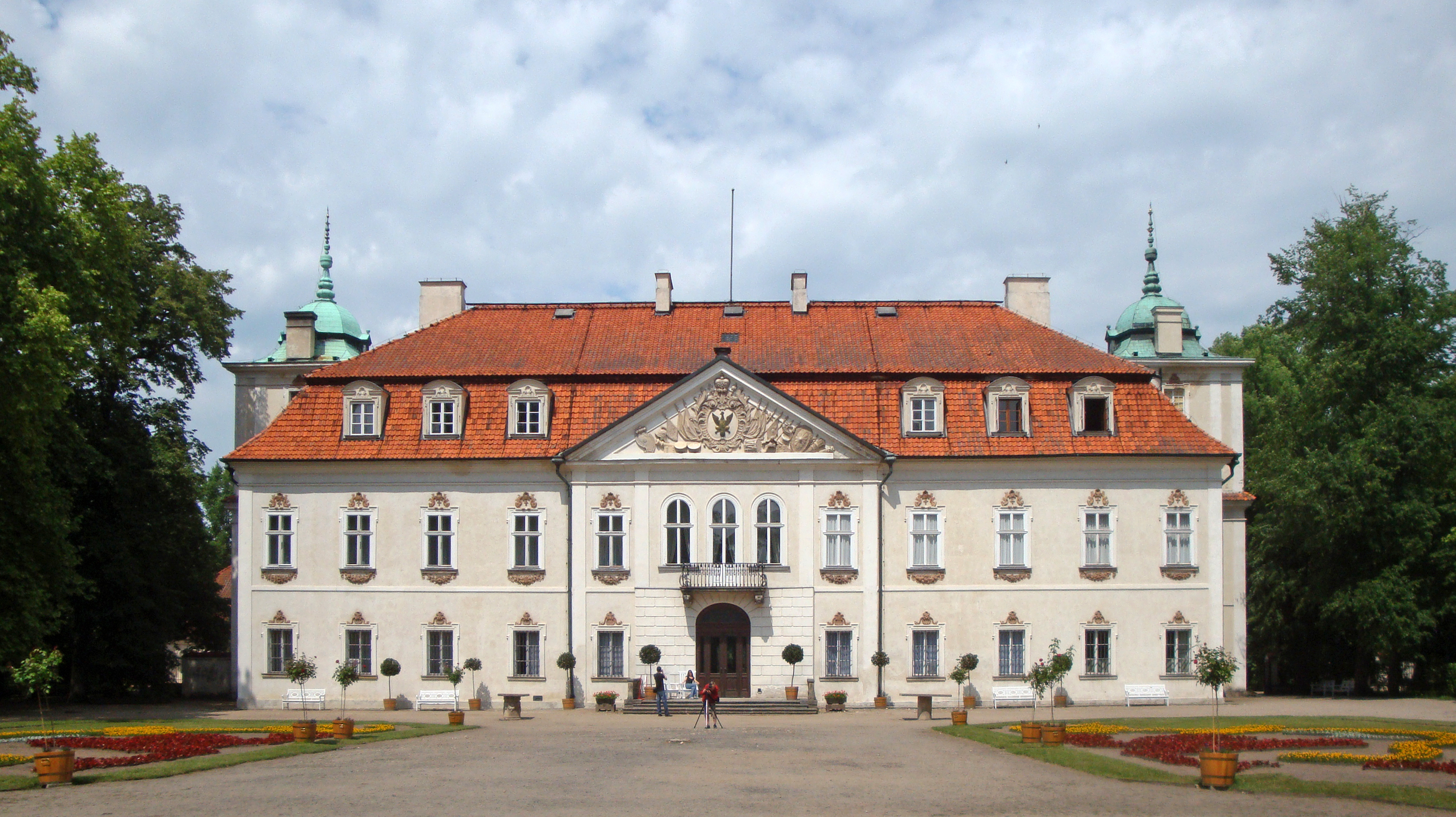
Nieborów Palace

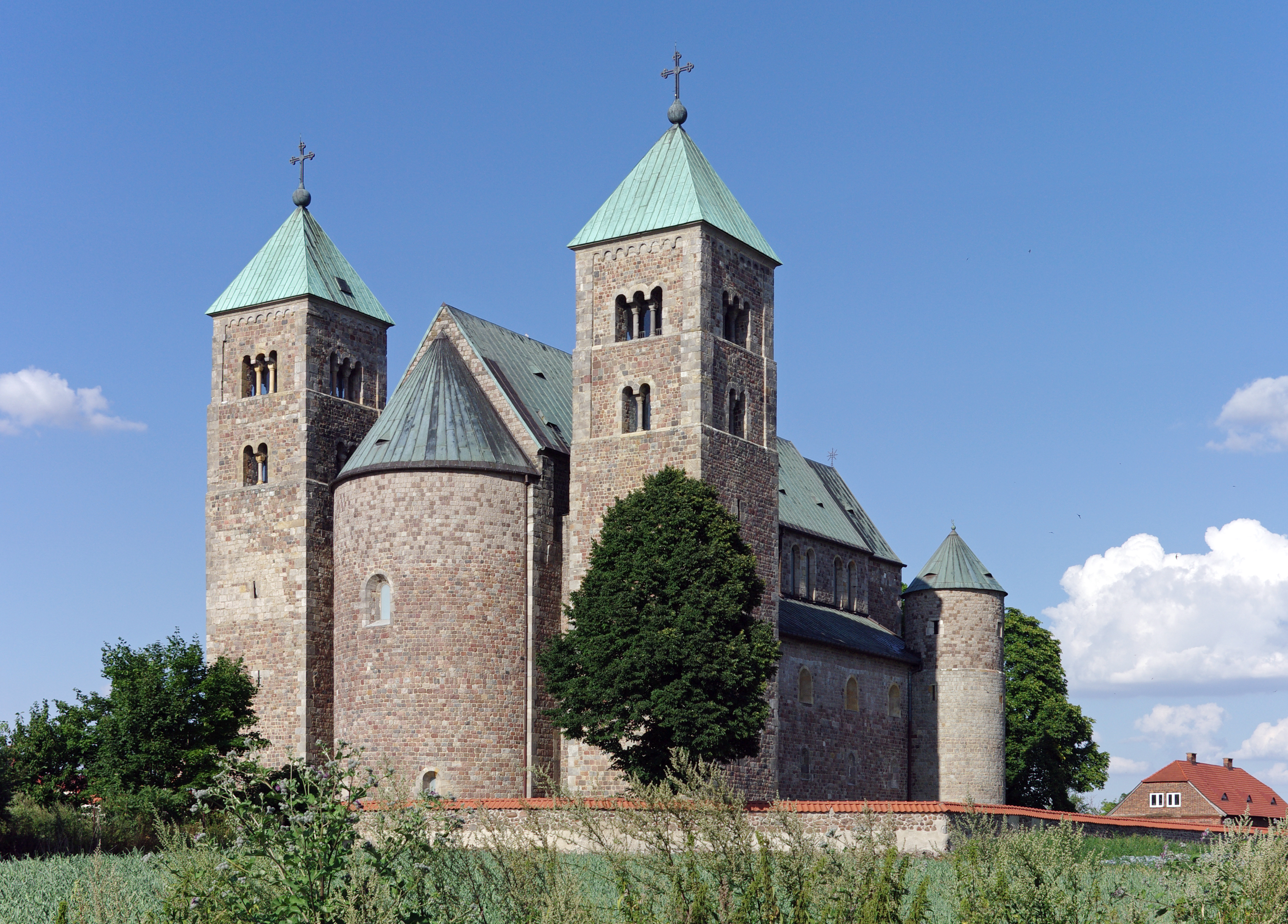
Tum Collegiate Church

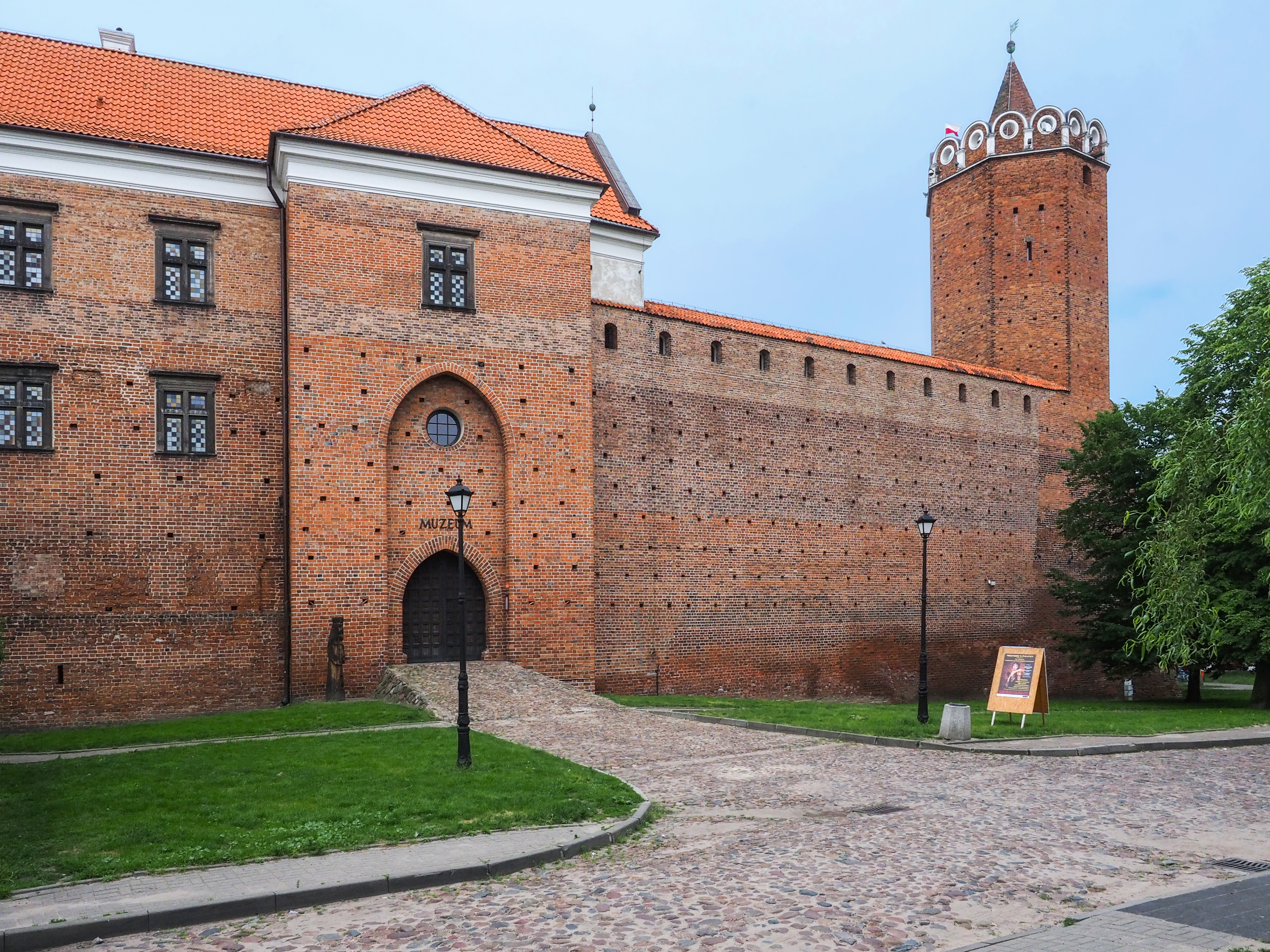
Łęczyca Royal Castle

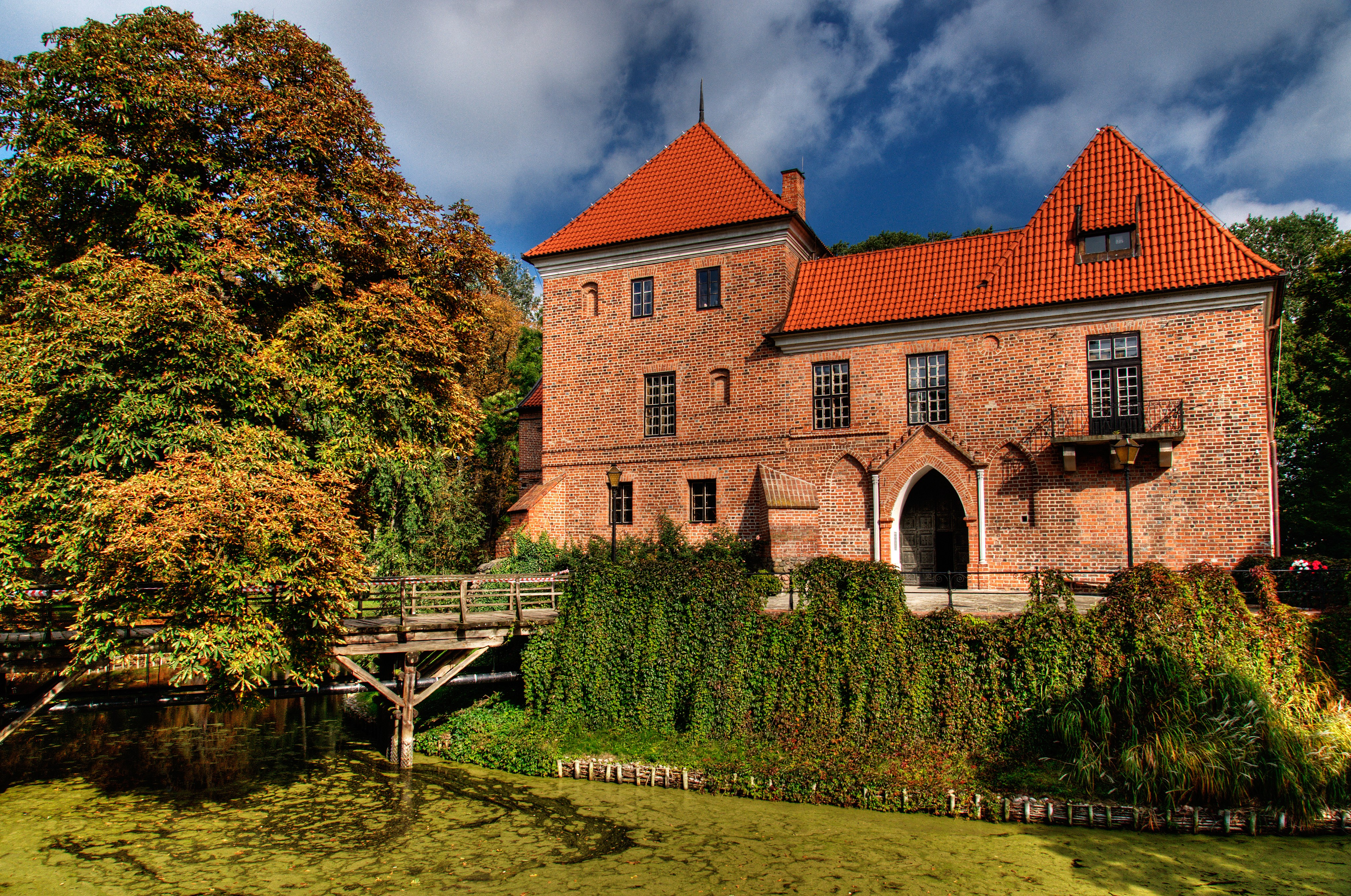
Oporów Castle

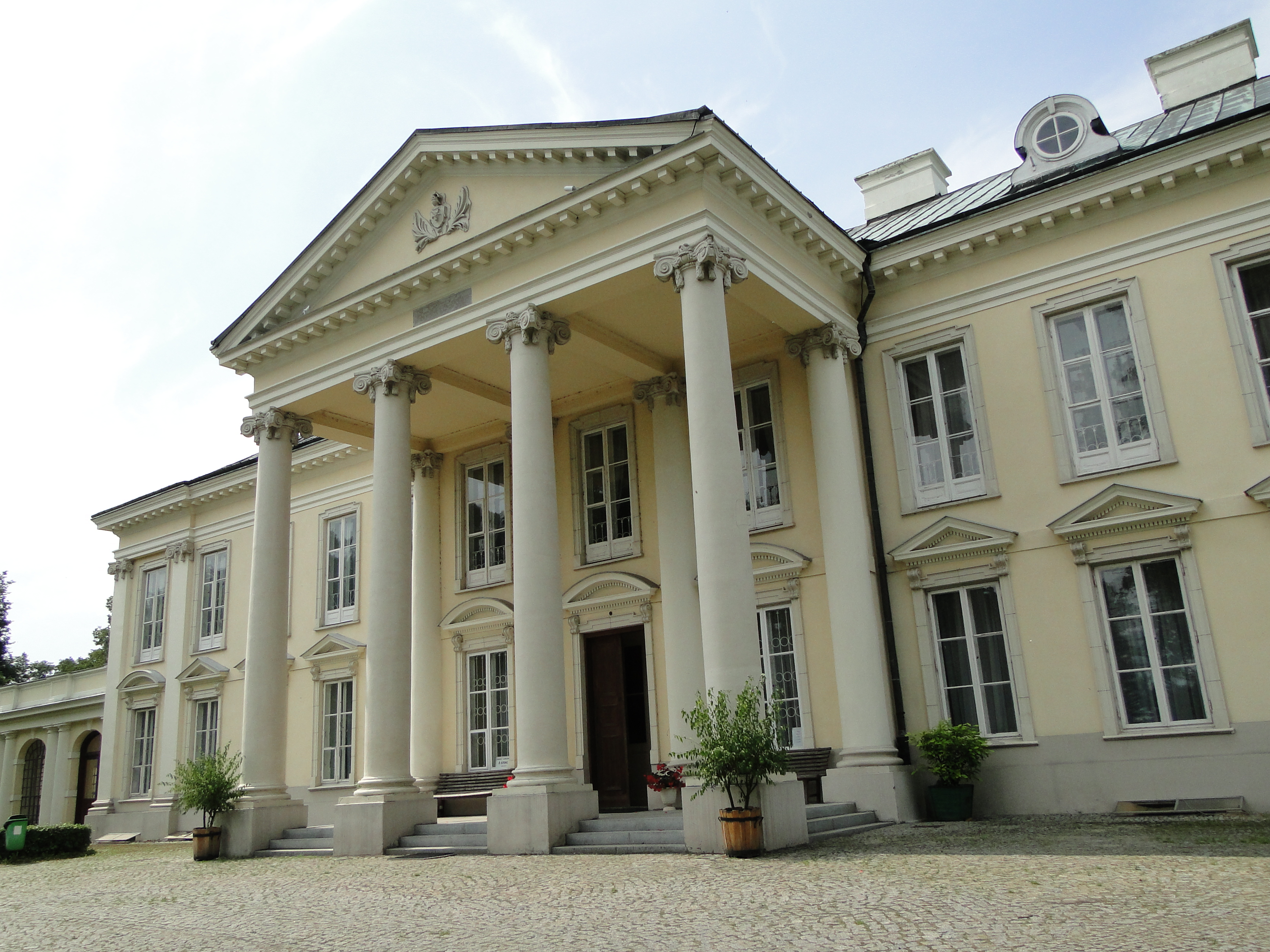
Walewice Palace

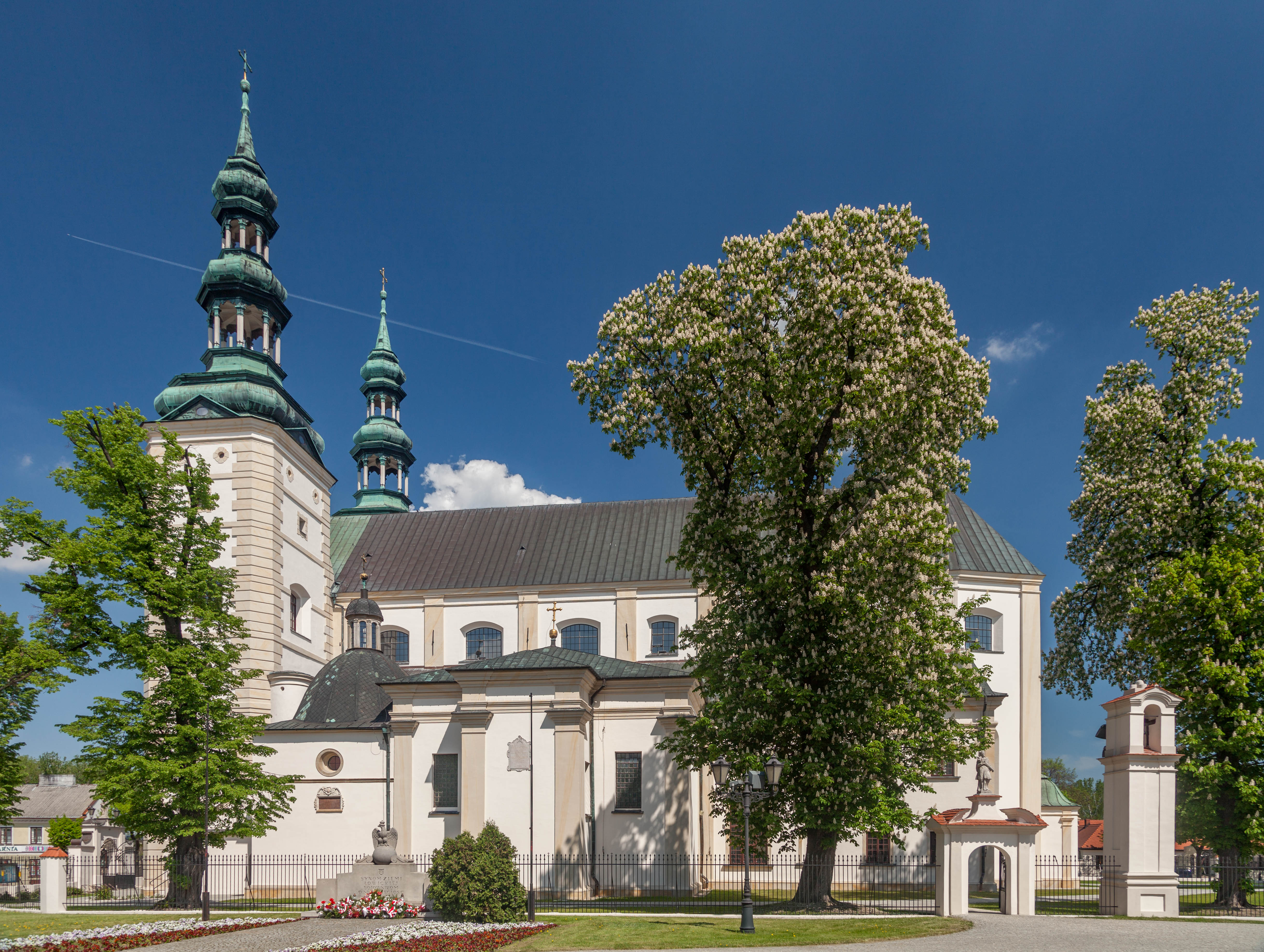
Łowicz Cathedral

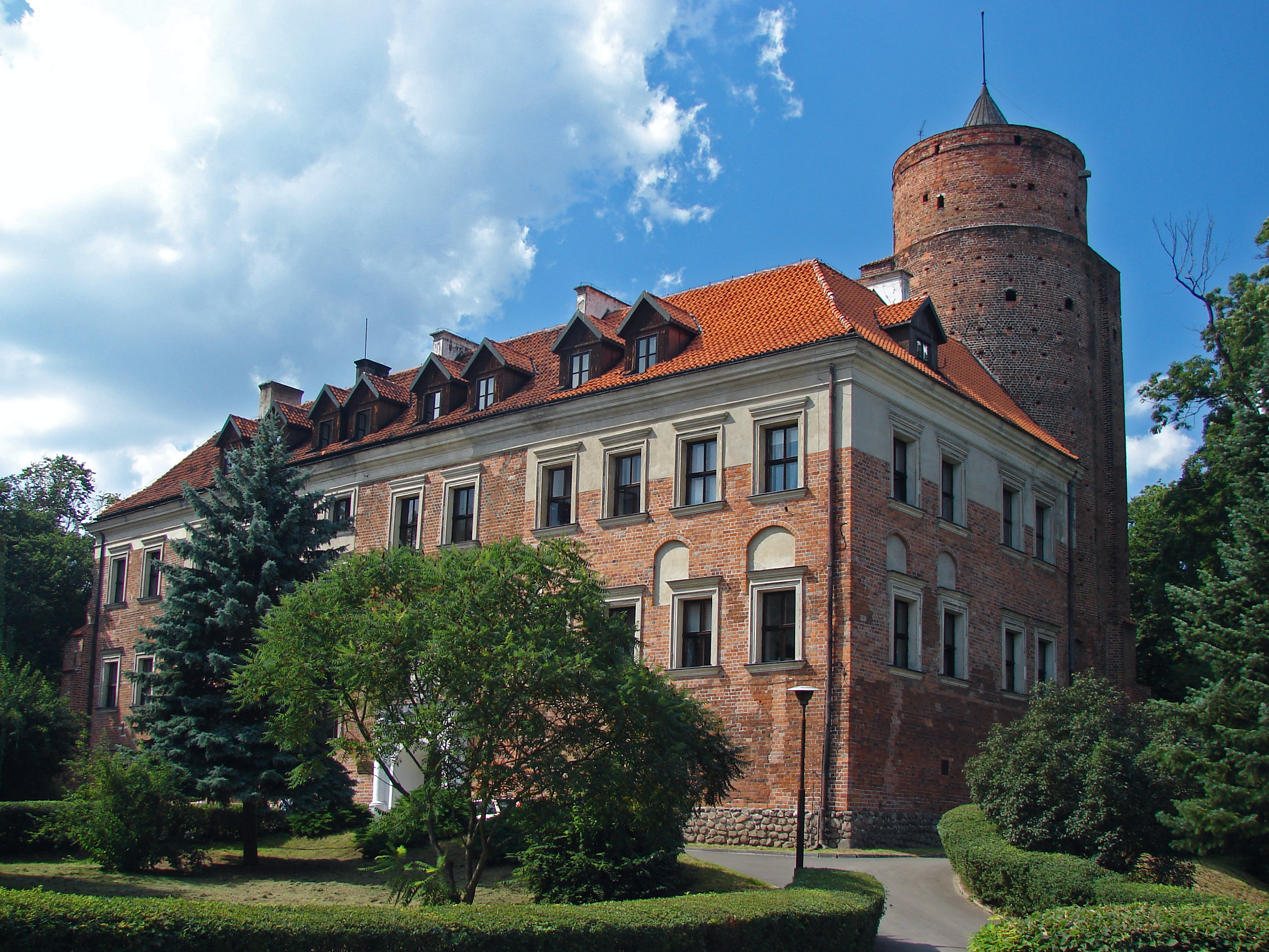
Uniejów Castle

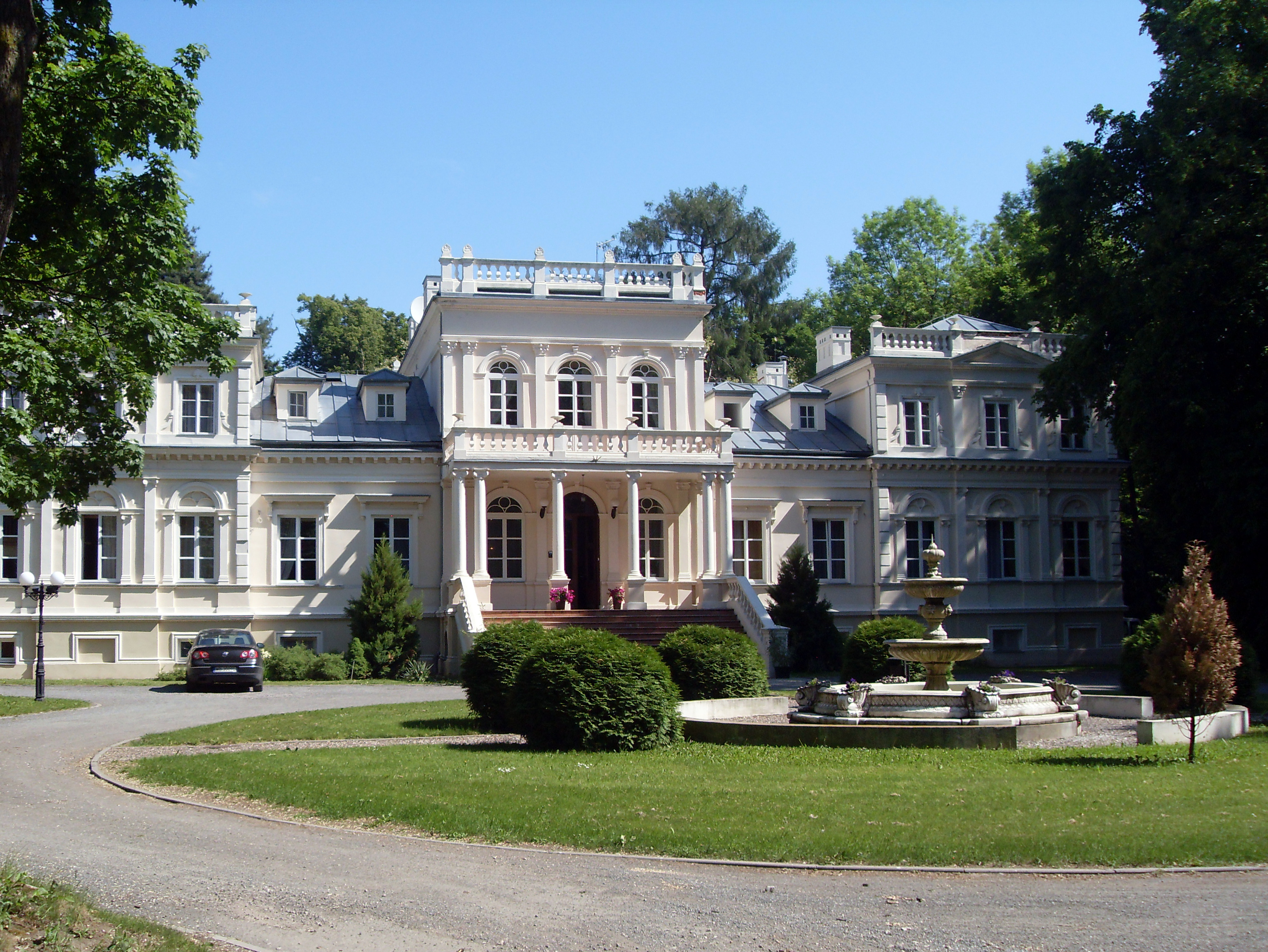
Palace in Wola-Chojnata

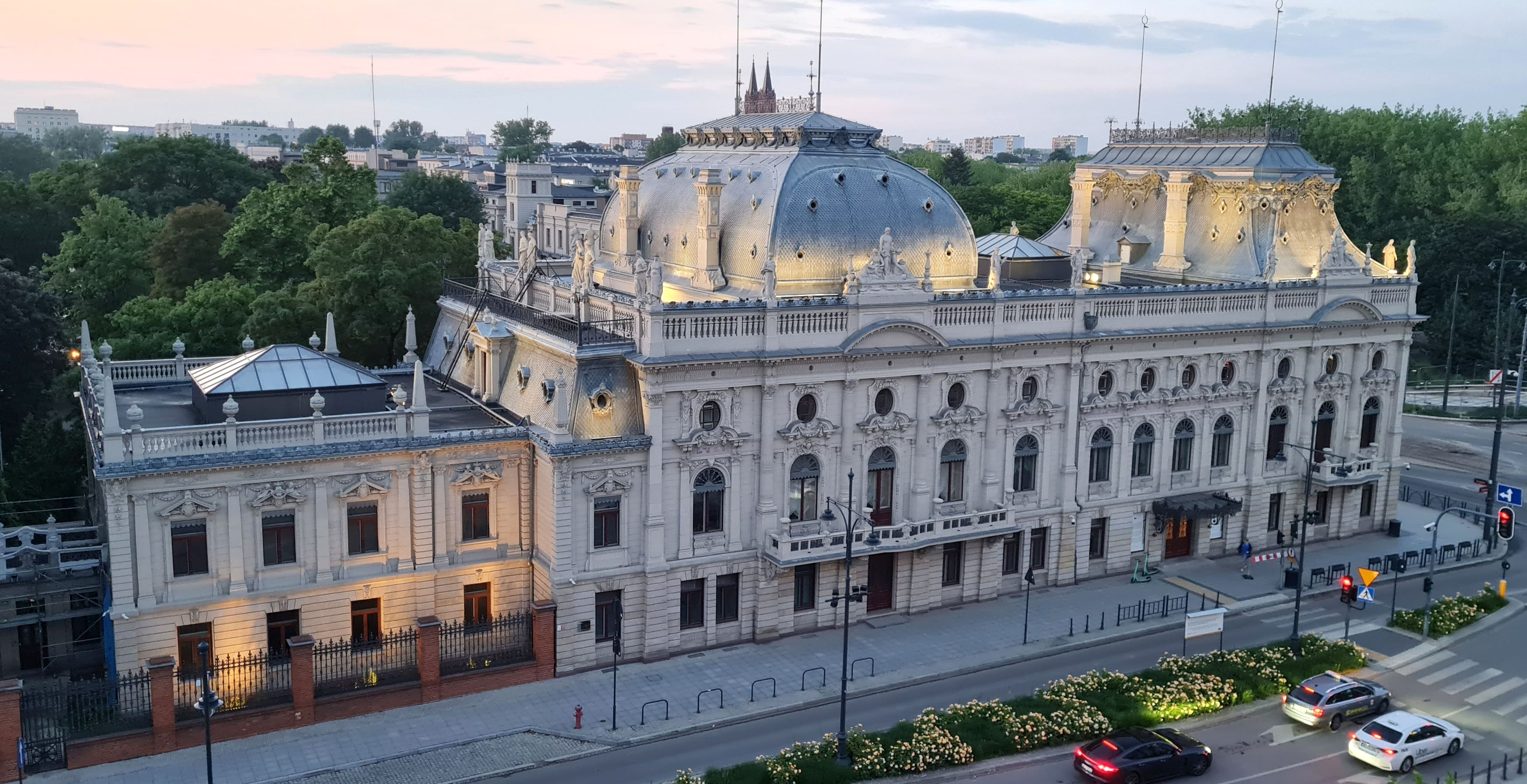
Poznański Palace in Łódź

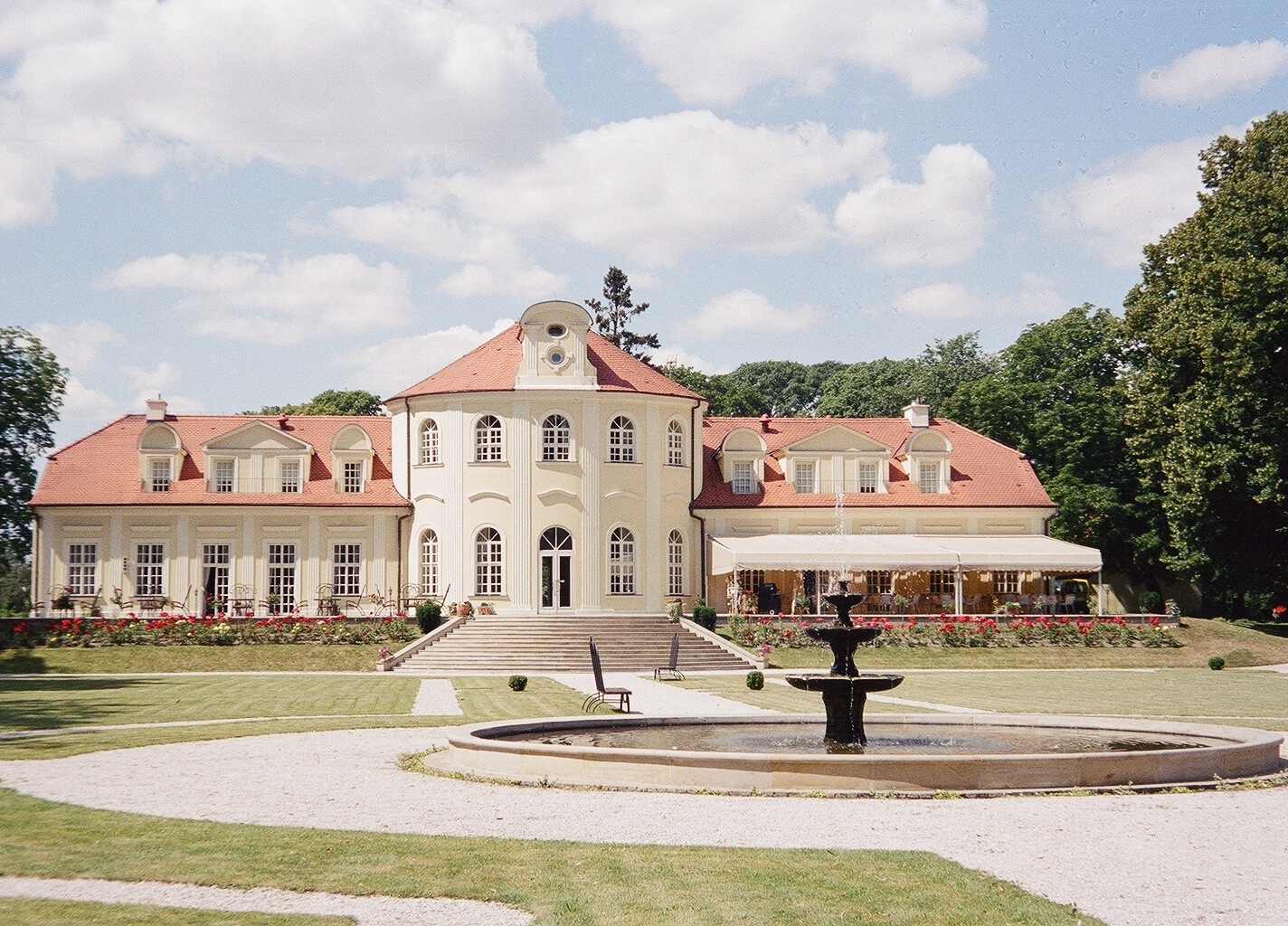
Sokolniki Palace

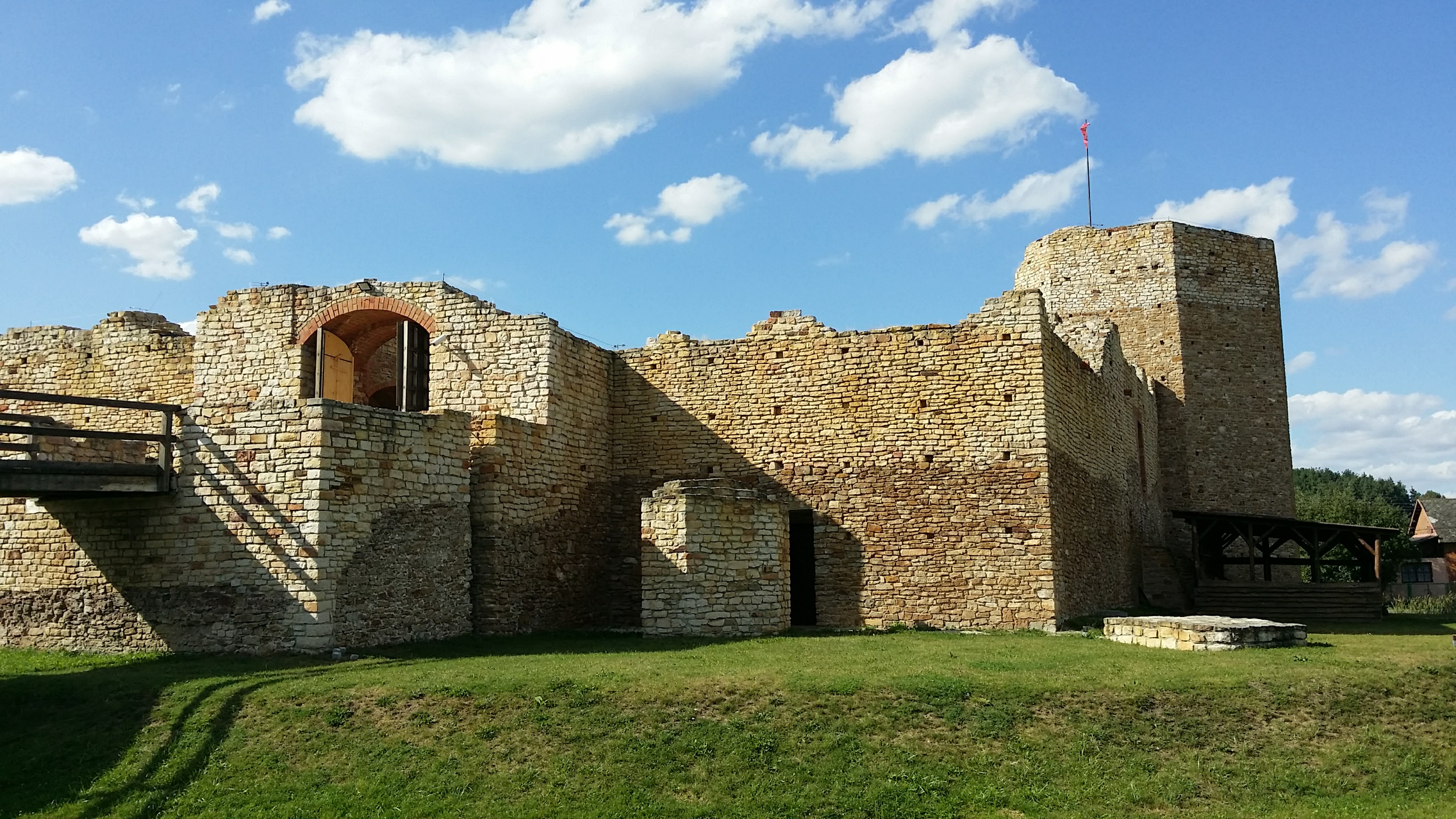
Inowłódz Castle

== Sports ==
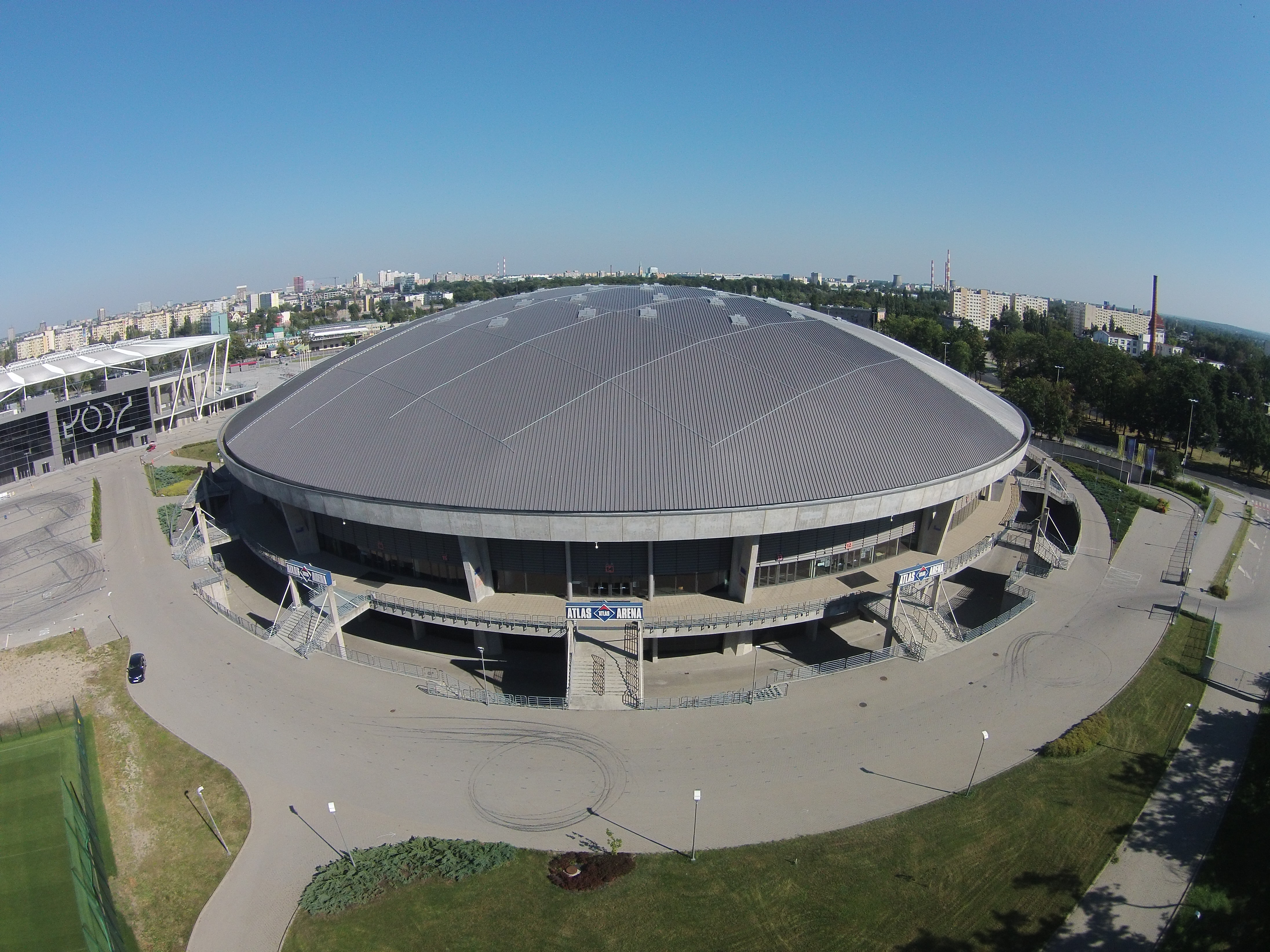
Atlas Arena multipurpose indoor arena in Łódź

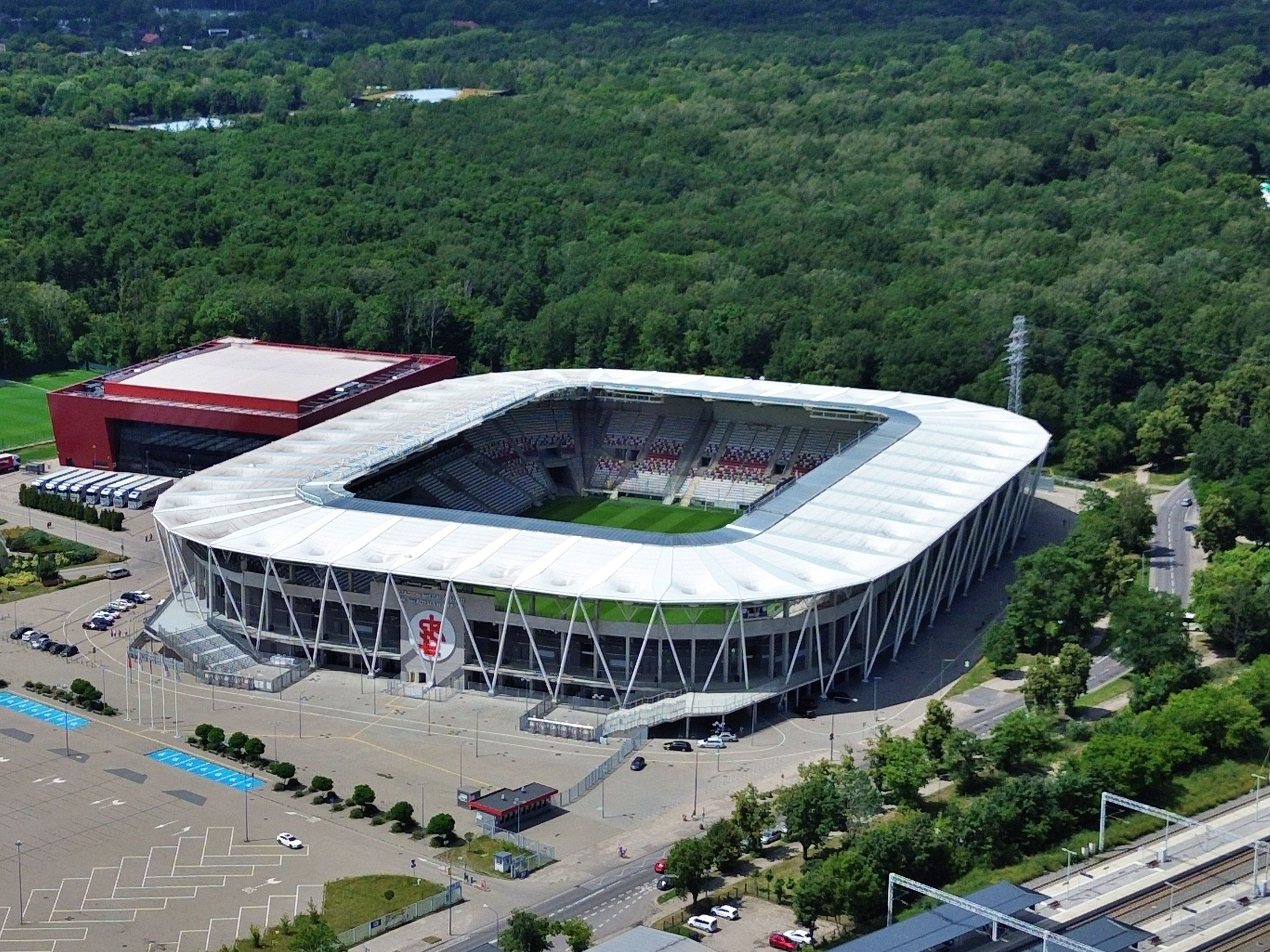
Władysław Król Stadium, home venue of the ŁKS Łódź football team

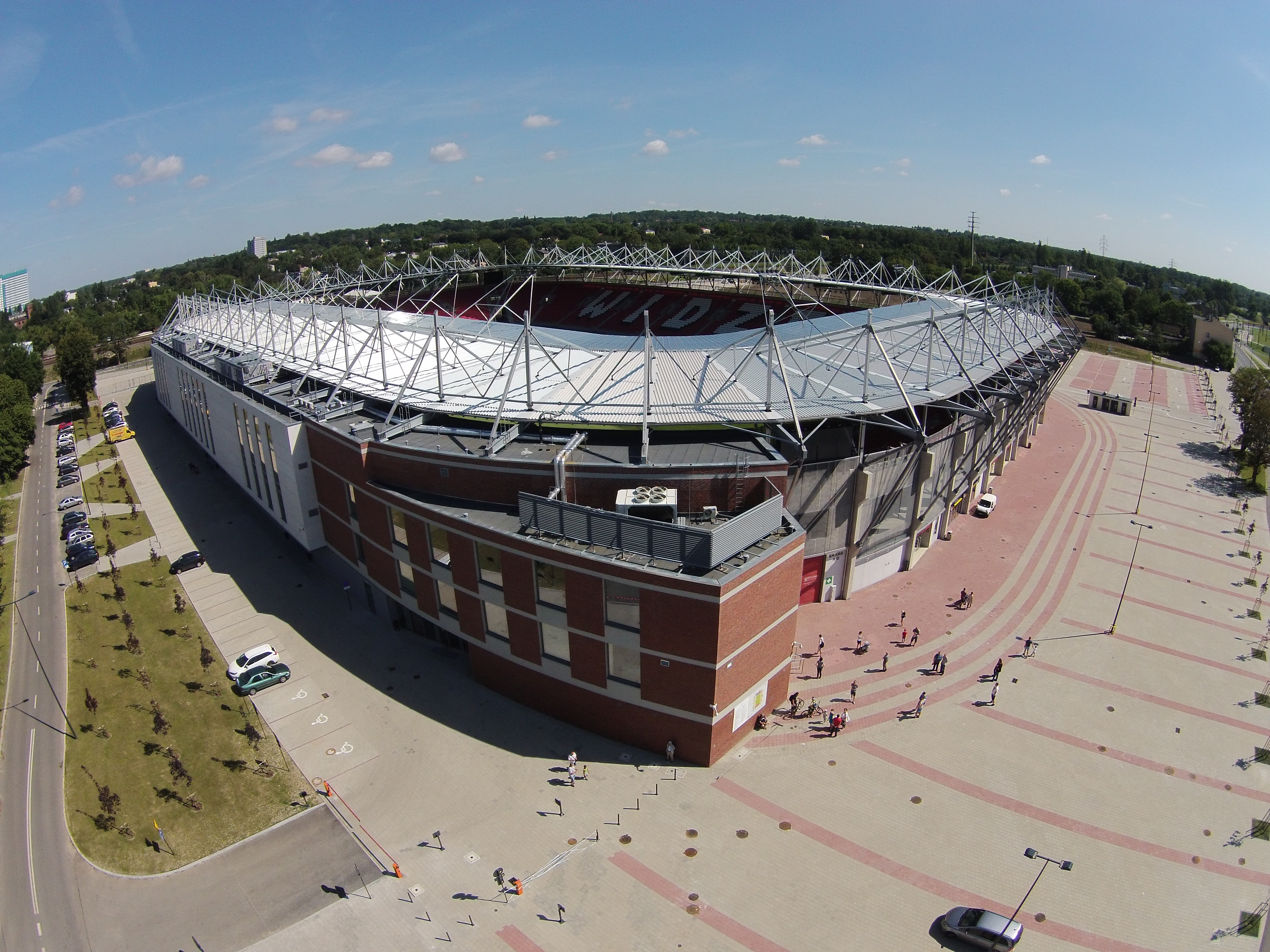
Widzew Łódź Stadium, home venue of the Widzew Łódź football team

Football and volleyball enjoy the largest following in the province. ŁKS Łódź and Widzew Łódź contest the Łódź Derby, one of the fiercest football rivalries in Poland.

Professional sports teams
Club	Sport	League	Trophies
ŁKS Łódź	Football (men's)	I liga	2 Polish Championships (1958, 1998); 1 Polish Cup (1957)
Widzew Łódź	Football (men's)	Ekstraklasa	4 Polish Championships; 1 Polish Cup (1985)
Unia Skierniewice	Football (men's)	I liga	
Skra Bełchatów	Volleyball (men's)	PlusLiga	9 Polish Championships; 7 Polish Cups
Lechia Tomaszów Mazowiecki	Volleyball (men's)	I liga	0
ŁKS Łódź	Volleyball (women's)	Tauron Liga	3 Polish Championships (1983, 2019, 2023); 3 Polish Cups (1976, 1982, 1986)
Budowlani Łódź	Volleyball (women's)	Tauron Liga	1 Polish Championship (2026); 3 Polish Cups (2010, 2018, 2026)
Orzeł Łódź	Speedway	I liga	0
Piotrkowianin Piotrków Trybunalski	Handball (men's)	Superliga	0
Anilana Łódź	Handball (men's)	I liga	1 Polish Championship (1983); 2 Polish Cups (1973, 1977)
Piotrcovia Piotrków Trybunalski	Handball (women's)	Superliga	1 Polish Championship (1993)
Budowlani Łódź	Rugby union	Ekstraliga	5 Polish Championships; 5 Polish Cups
Budo 2011 Aleksandrów Łódzki	Rugby union	Ekstraliga	4 Polish Championships; 3 Polish Cups (2011, 2012, 2016)
ŁKS Łódź	Basketball (men's)	I Liga	1 Polish Championship (1953)
ŁKS Łódź	Basketball (women's)	I Liga	9 Polish Championships
PTK Pabianice	Basketball (women's)	I Liga	0
Widzew Łódź	Futsal (men's)	Ekstraklasa	0

Since the establishment of the province, several international sports competitions were co-hosted by the province, including the EuroBasket 2009, 2009 Women's European Volleyball Championship, EuroBasket Women 2011, 2014 FIVB Volleyball Men's World Championship, and 2019 FIFA U-20 World Cup.

== Curiosities ==
- The Polish language of the inhabitants of the voivodeship is considered the closest to the Polish literary language, as the region did not develop its own dialect, but was a place of blending of dialects from the neighboring larger regions of Greater Poland, Lesser Poland, Mazovia and Silesia.
- In the 17th century, the towns of Brzeziny, Sieradz and Warta were home to sizeable Scottish communities.
