= Łódź Hills Landscape Park =

Protected area in central Poland

Coordinates: 51°50′45″N 19°37′45″E

- Park Krajobrazowy Wzniesień Łódzkich
- IUCN category V (protected landscape/seascape)
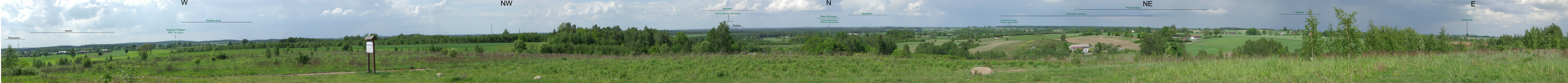
- Panorama of the Łodź's Hills Landscape Park from a hill in Plichtów.Object marked green are in the Łodź's Hills Landscape Park.
- Interactive map of Łódź Hills Landscape Park
- Location: Łódź Voivodeship
- Area: 137.67 km^{2} (53.15 sq mi)
- Established: 1996

Łódź Hills Landscape Park (Park Krajobrazowy Wzniesień Łódzkich) is a protected area (Landscape Park) in central Poland, established in 1996, covering an area of 137.67 square kilometres (53.15 sq mi).

The Park lies within Łódź Voivodeship: in Brzeziny County (Gmina Brzeziny, Gmina Dmosin), Łódź East County (Gmina Nowosolna) and Zgierz County (Gmina Stryków, Gmina Zgierz). Within the Landscape Park are three nature reserves.
