= Uniejów Castle =

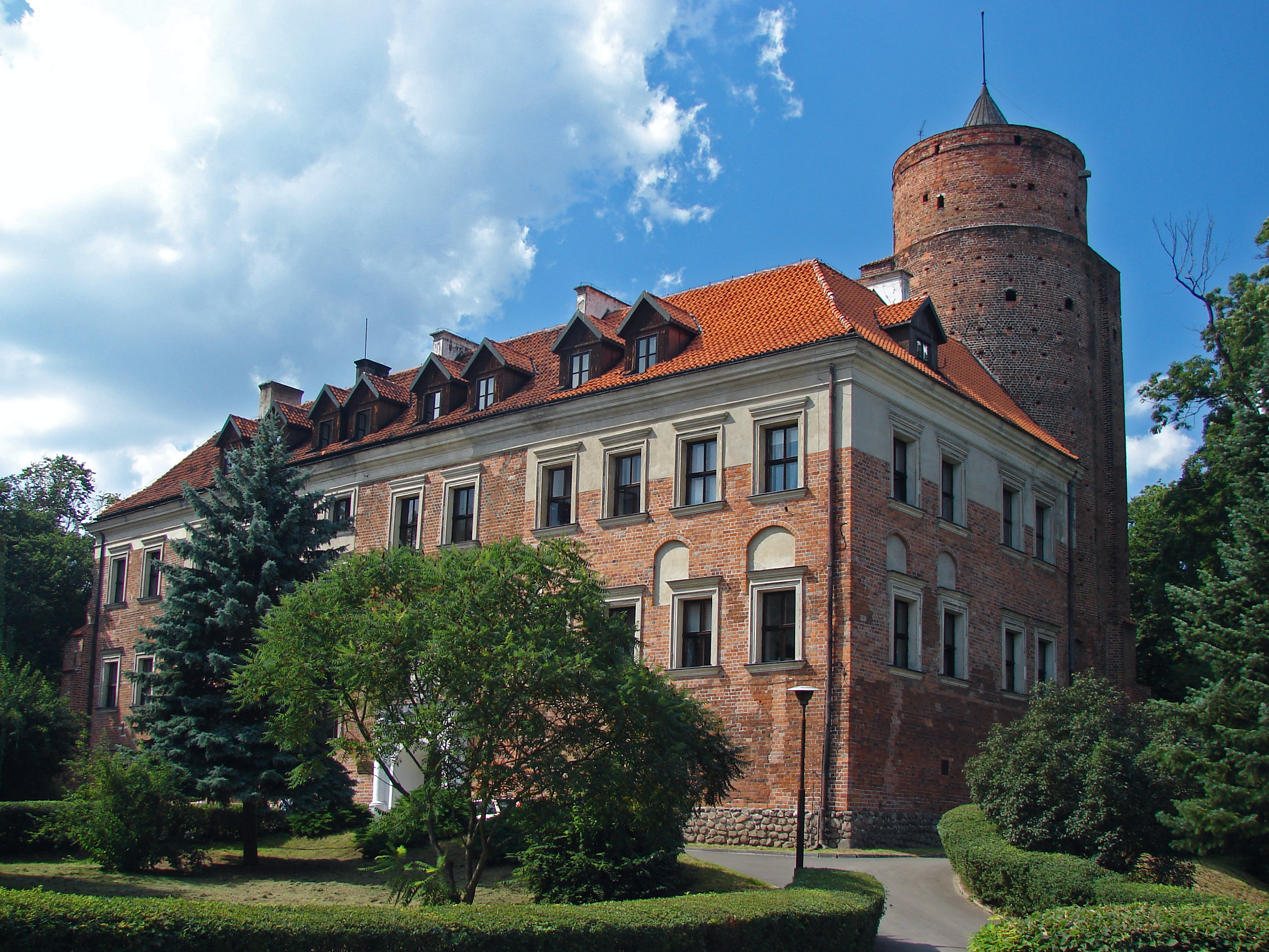
- Uniejów Castle

- Location of the Uniejów Castle in Poland
- 51°58′22″N 18°47′29″E
- Location: Uniejów, Łódź Voivodeship, in Poland

History
- Built: 1360–1365
- Rebuilt: 1525–1534, 1848

Site notes
- Architectural style: Classical

Uniejów Castle (Polish: Zamek w Uniejowie) is a 14th-century bishops' castle located on left bank of the Warta River in Uniejów, Łódź Voivodeship, Poland. It is considered one of the main places of interest in the town.

== History ==
The castle was built between 1360 and 1365 on the site of a former wooden fortress, destroyed after a raid by the Teutonic Knights in 1331. The initiator of the construction of the castle was Gniezno's Archbishop Jarosław Bogoria Skotnicki, one of the closest associates to Casimir III the Great.

The building was greatly expanded and modernised between 1525 and 1534, when after a fire most of the castle's Gothic characteristics had gone. The stronghold had ended's its militaristic significance in the seventeenth century, when the castle became a residence. In 1836 the castle was taken over by the House of Toll, an Estonian family. In 1848, Aleksander Toll had reconstructed the castle into a Classical architectural style. The castle in Uniejów is a prime example of accretion of architectural styles.

Between 1956–1967, the castle underwent a restoration and was turned into an archive. The building currently houses a hotel and a conference center.

== Gallery ==
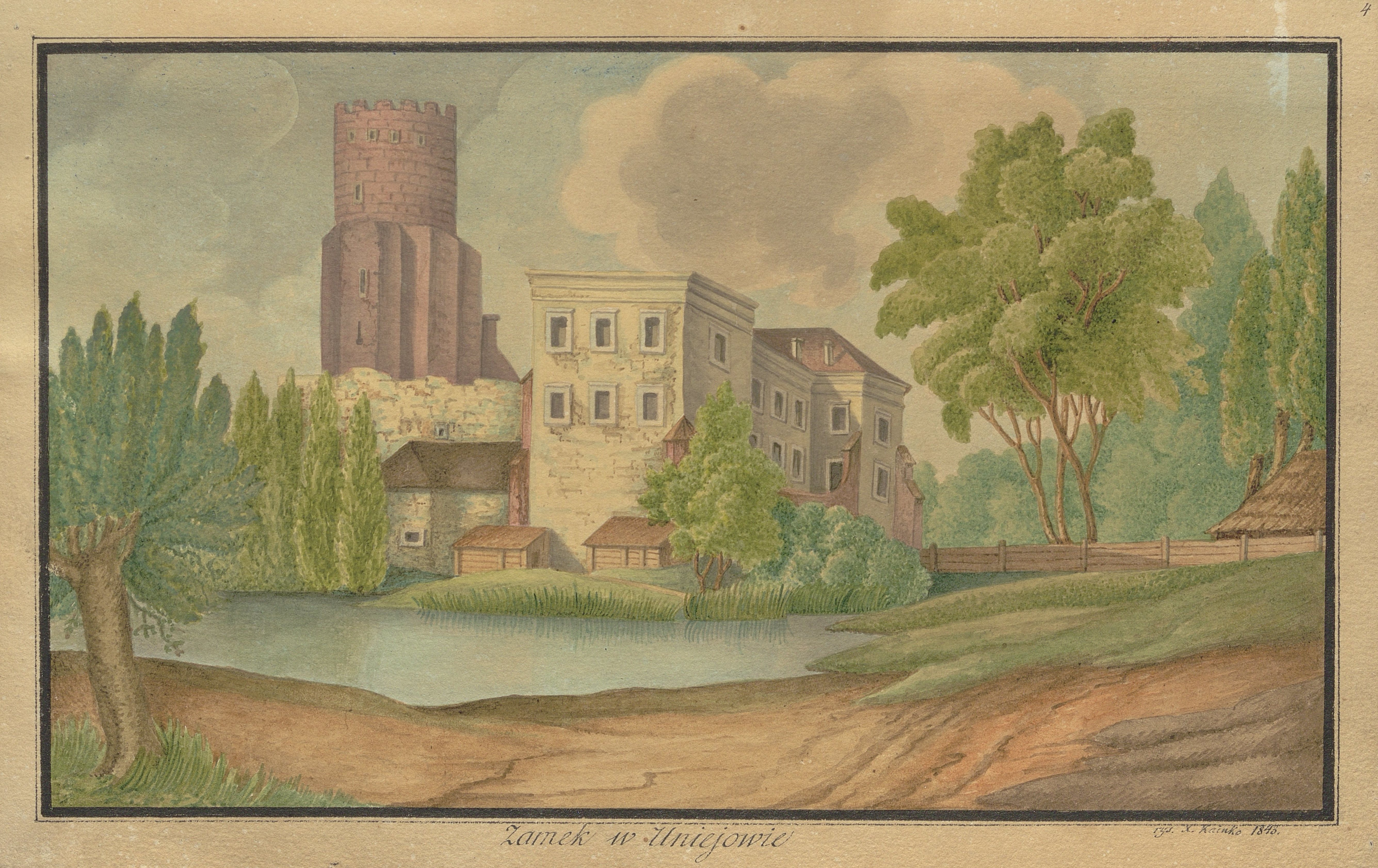
Castle on illustration from 1843

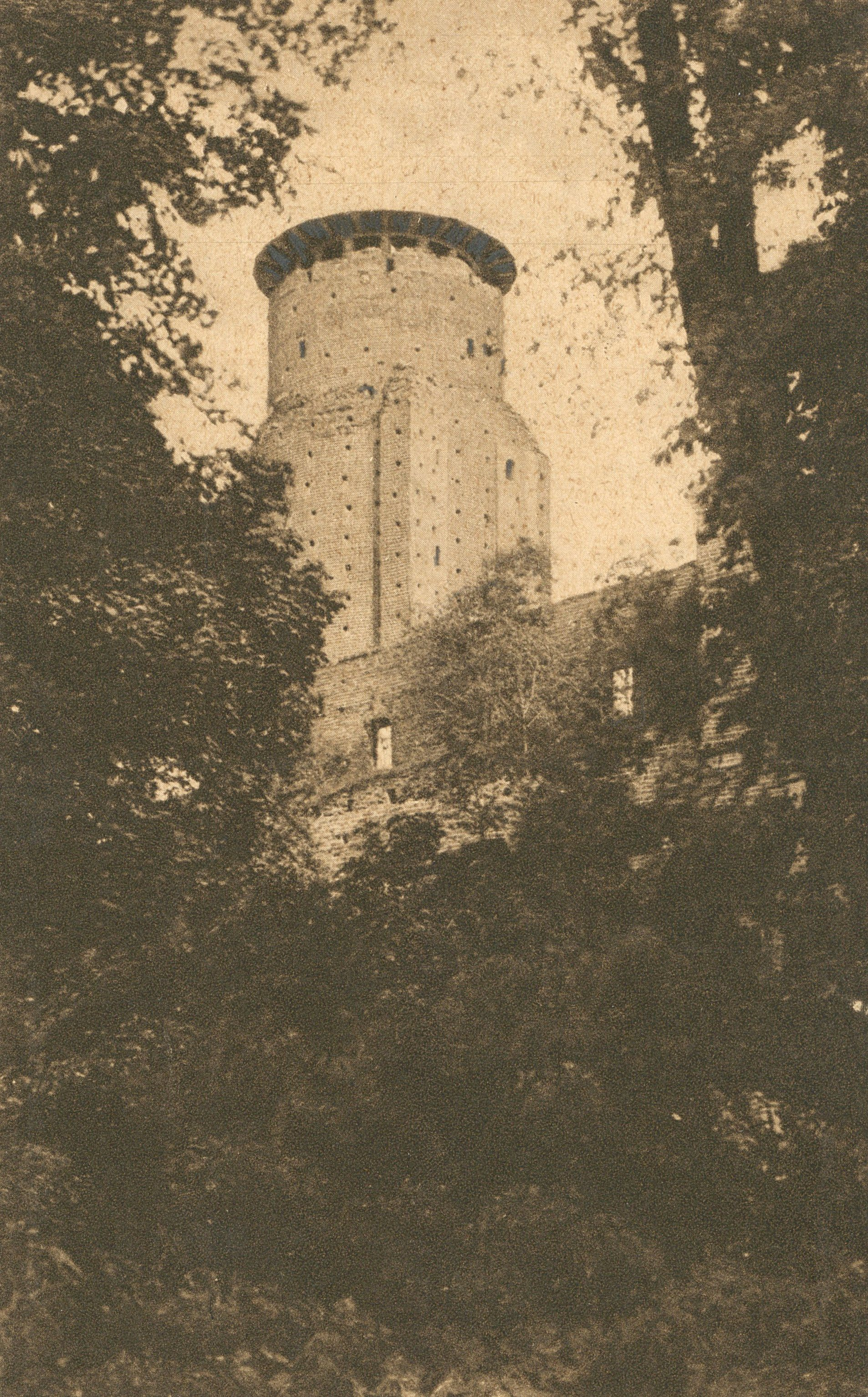
Castle's tower w 1926

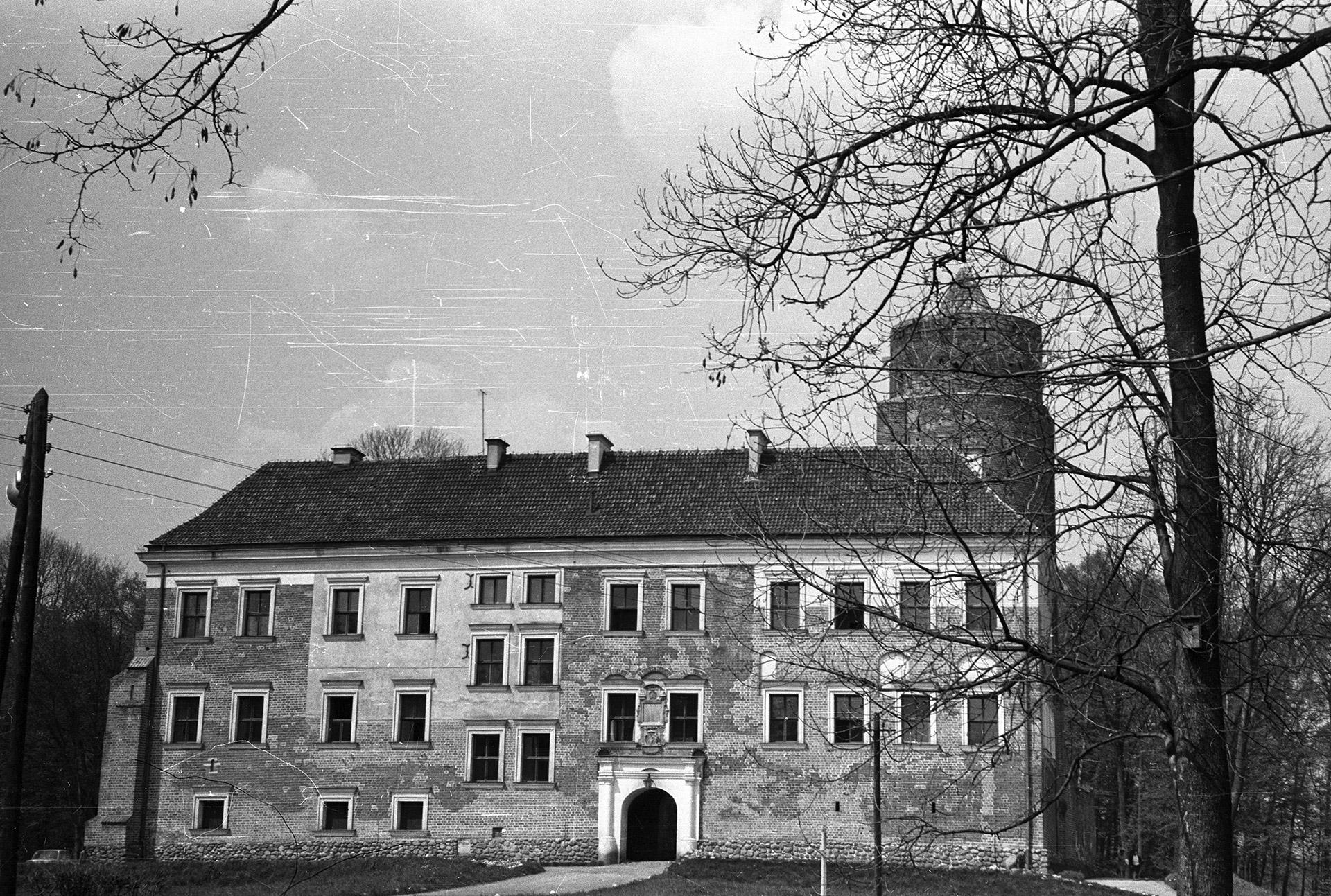
Castle in 1971

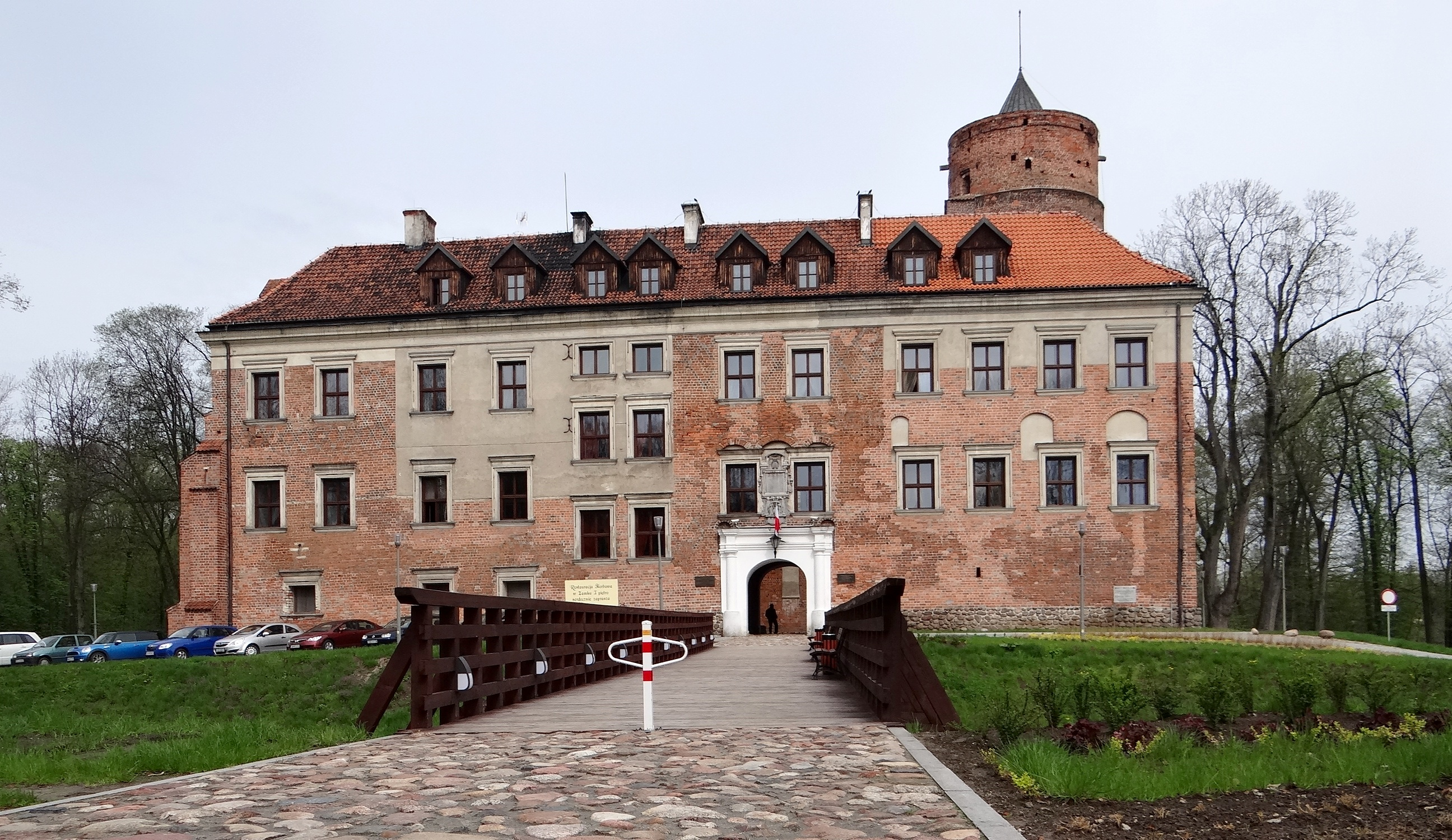
Castle in 2013

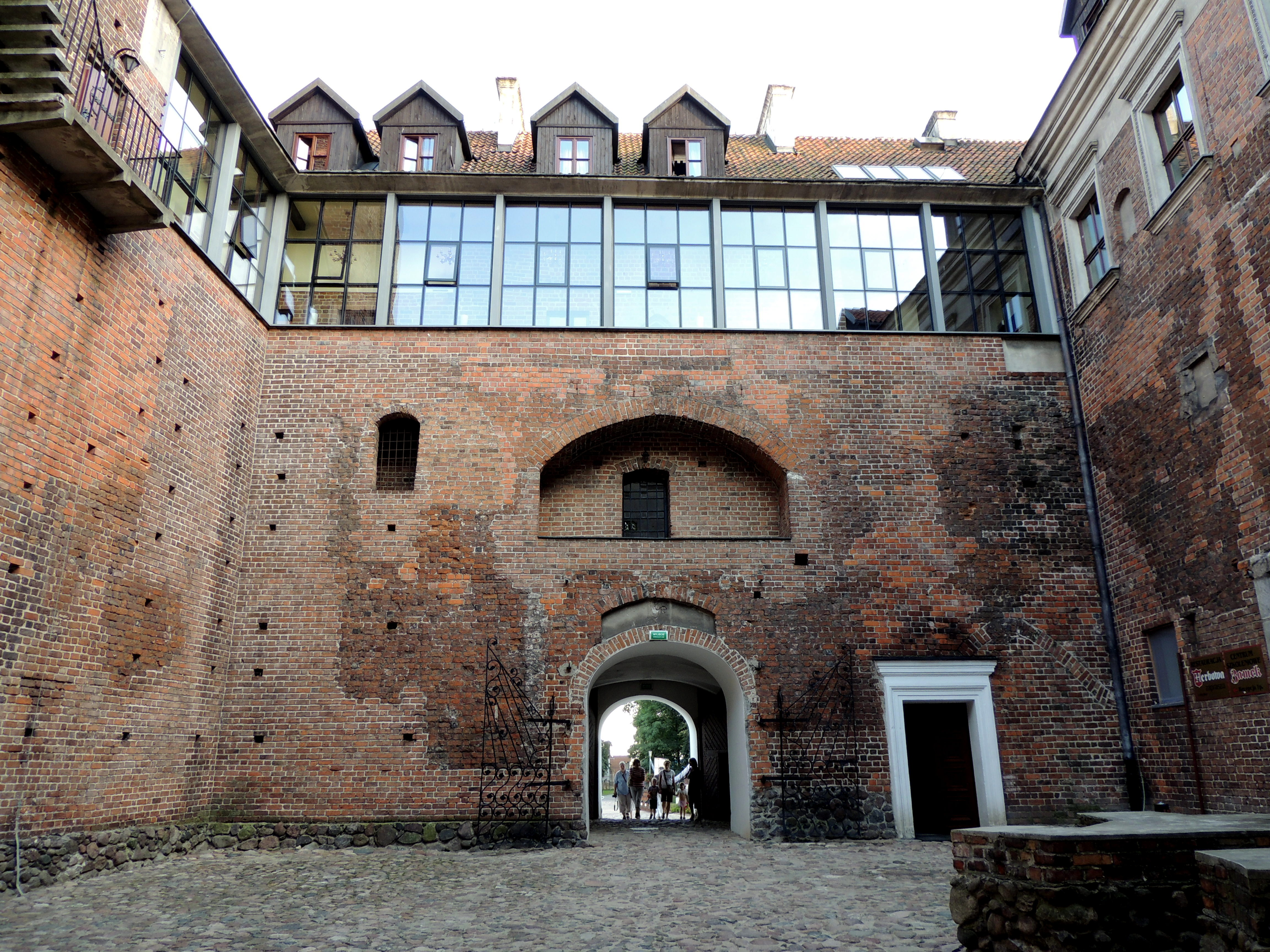
Courtyard in 2013

== See also ==
- Castles in Poland
