= Drzewica Castle =

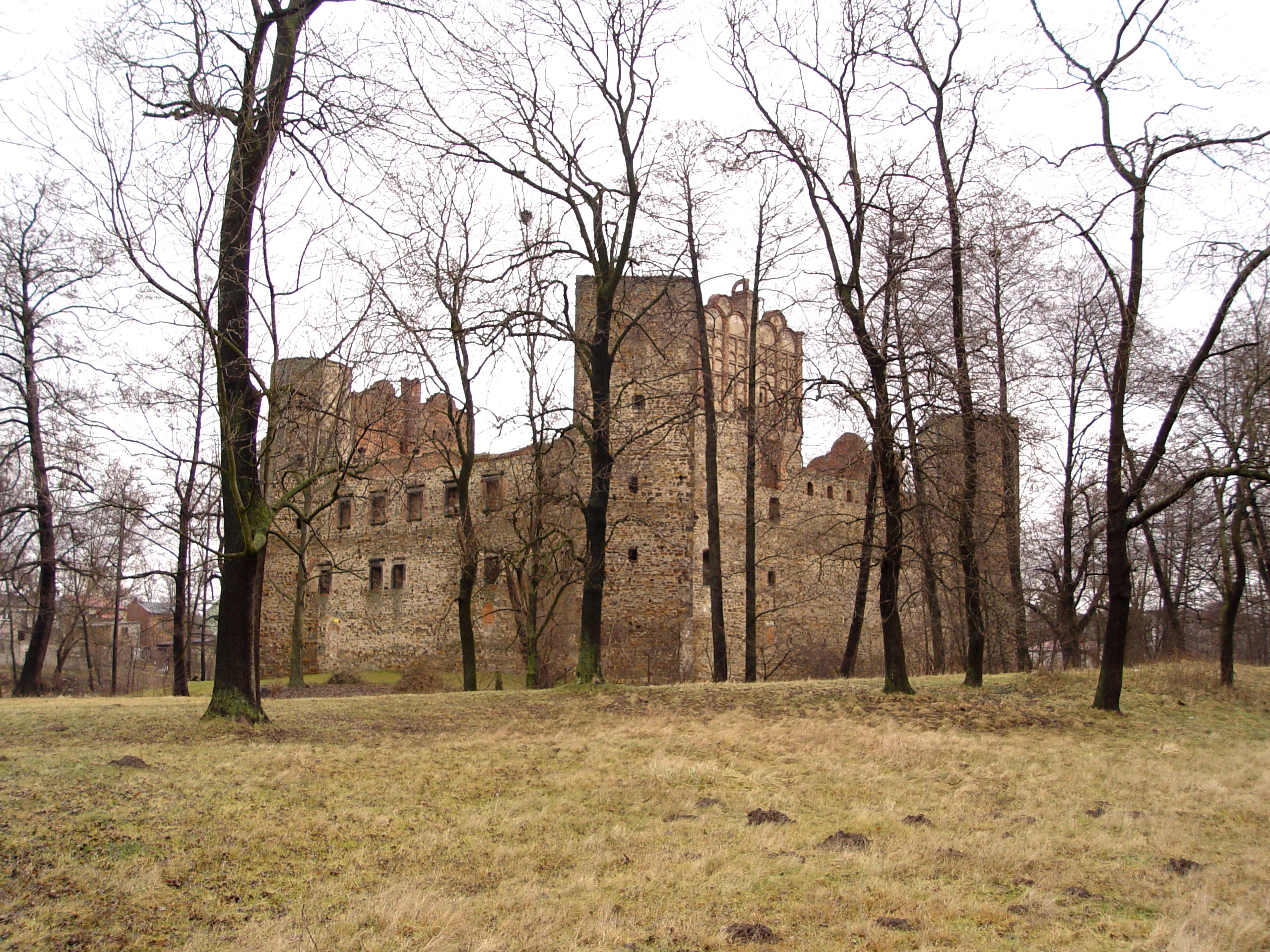
- Drzewica Castle

- Location of the Drzewica Castle in Poland
- 51°26′58″N 20°28′42″E
- Location: Drzewica, Łódź Voivodeship, in Poland

History
- Built: 1527-1535

Site notes
- Architectural style: Gothic-Renaissance

Drzewica Castle is a Gothic-Renaissance castle built between 1527 and 1535 by archbishop of Gniezno Maciej Drzewicki in Drzewica, Poland. The archbishop built the castle on the peripheries of the town, by the river Drzewiczka and encircled the fortress with moats, separated by a bulwark. The building's plan is based on a regular rectangular shape. Its defence systems are based on four square towers located in each corner of the castle. The building burned down in 1814, remaining a well preserved ruin. Thus, the castle did not undergo any later modifications, remaining one of Poland's best preserved residences from the first part of the sixteenth-century.

== See also ==
- Drzewica
- Castles in Poland
