= Dorota Ryl =

Polish politician

Voivode of Łódź Voivodeship
- Incumbent
- Assumed office 20 December 2023
- President: Andrzej Duda; Karol Nawrocki
- Prime Minister: Donald Tusk
- Preceded by: Karol Młynarczyk

Personal details
- Born: 2 March 1961 (age 65) Sieradz, Polish People's Republic
- Citizenship: Poland
- Party: Civic Platform
- Education: Higher School of Commerce
- Occupation: Politician
- Awards: Medal for Long Service; Badge of Merit for Fire Protection; ZHP Medal of Gratitude

Dorota Helena Ryl, née Woźniak (born March 2, 1961 in Sieradz) is a Polish local government official and civil servant. She served as Deputy Marshal of the Łódź Voivodeship from 2010 to 2014, Vice-Chairwoman of the Łódź Voivodeship Sejmik from 2014 to 2018, and Voivode of Łódź Voivodeship from 2023.

== Biography ==
She is a graduate of management and marketing at the Higher School of Commerce in Łódź, she completed postgraduate studies in internal auditing in administration and economics. She completed a higher defense course at the National Defense University and a diplomatic protocol course, obtaining the certification of an internal auditor. Initially, she worked at the Sieradz Commune Office and the Voivodeship Office in Sieradz. From 2000 to 2004, she was employed as Chief Audit Specialist at the Wieluń County Office. From 2004 to 2010, she served as an audit inspector at the Regional Chamber of Audit in Łódź.

She became involved in politics within the Civic Platform party. In 2010 and 2014, she was elected as a councilor to the Łódź Voivodeship Sejmik of the 4th and 5th terms. In 2011, she ran for the Senate in District 27, finishing second out of five candidates. During the 2010–2014 term, she served as Deputy Marshal of the Łódź Voivodeship, and in the following term, she assumed the positions of Deputy Chair of the Łódź Voivodeship Sejmik and Chair of the Budget and Finance Committee. In 2016, she became Director of the Łódź Agricultural Advisory Center (Kościerzyn branch), and in 2017, Development Representative at the Rehabilitation and Treatment Center in Rafałówka. In 2018, she was unsuccessful in winning re-election to the regional assembly. However, she returned to the assembly during its sixth term, replacing the deceased Andrzej Owczarek. In 2023, she unsuccessfully ran for senator again (finishing second place among three candidates).

On December 20, 2023, she was appointed Voivode of Łódź Voivodeship.
