= Wola-Chojnata =

- Village
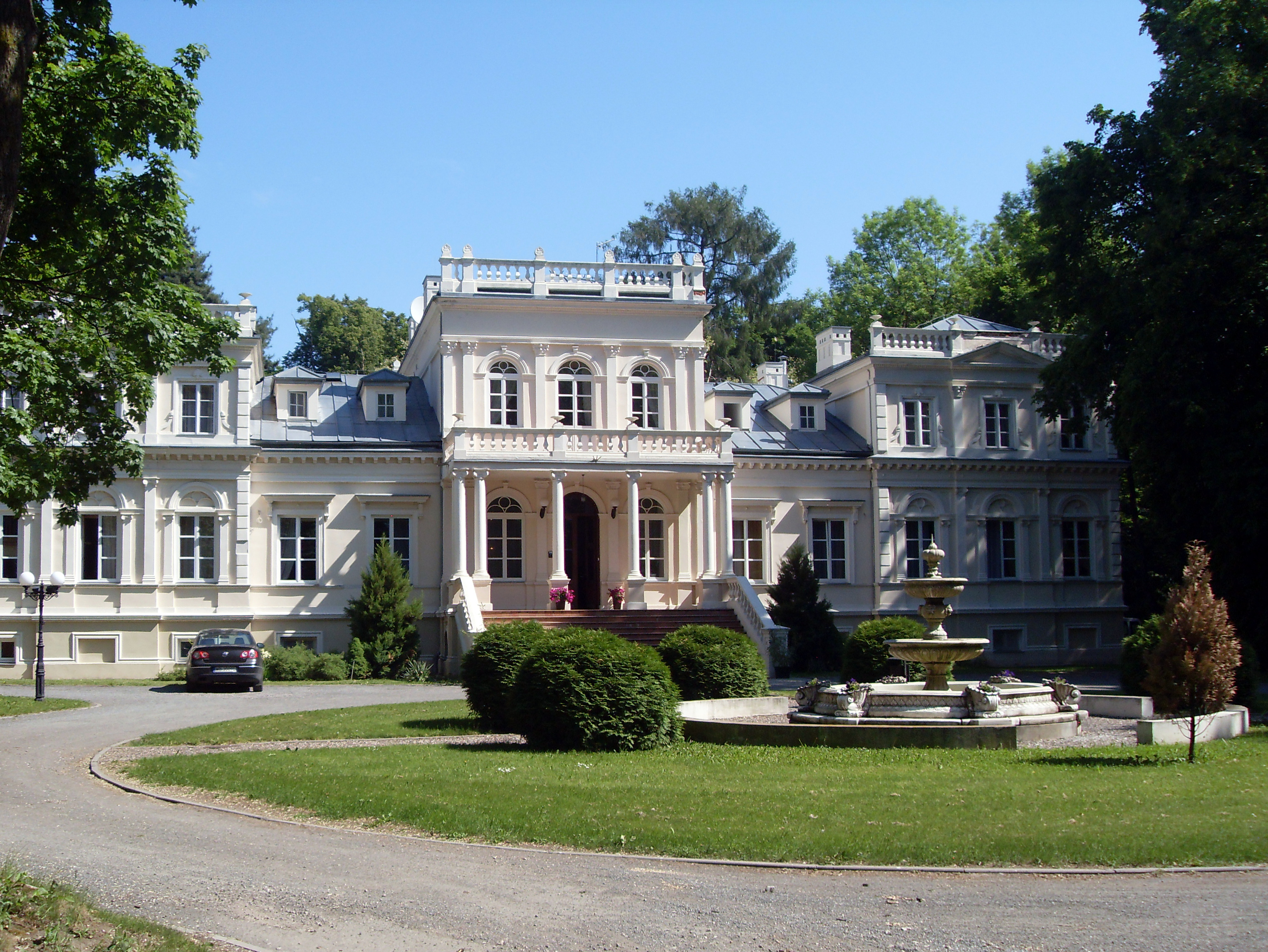
- 19th-century Chojnata Palace

- Location within Poland
- Coordinates: 51°47′N 20°31′E
- Country: Poland
- Voivodeship: Łódź
- County: Rawa
- Gmina: Biała Rawska
- Population: 450

Wola-Chojnata [ˈvɔla xɔi̯ˈnata] is a village in the administrative district of Gmina Biała Rawska, within Rawa County, Łódź Voivodeship, in central Poland.

The village is the site of the Renaissance Revival Chojnata Palace built in 1873 and surrounded by an English-style park.
