= Radogoszcz prison =

Nazi prison and concentration camp in Poland

Coordinates: 51°48′34″N 19°26′20″E

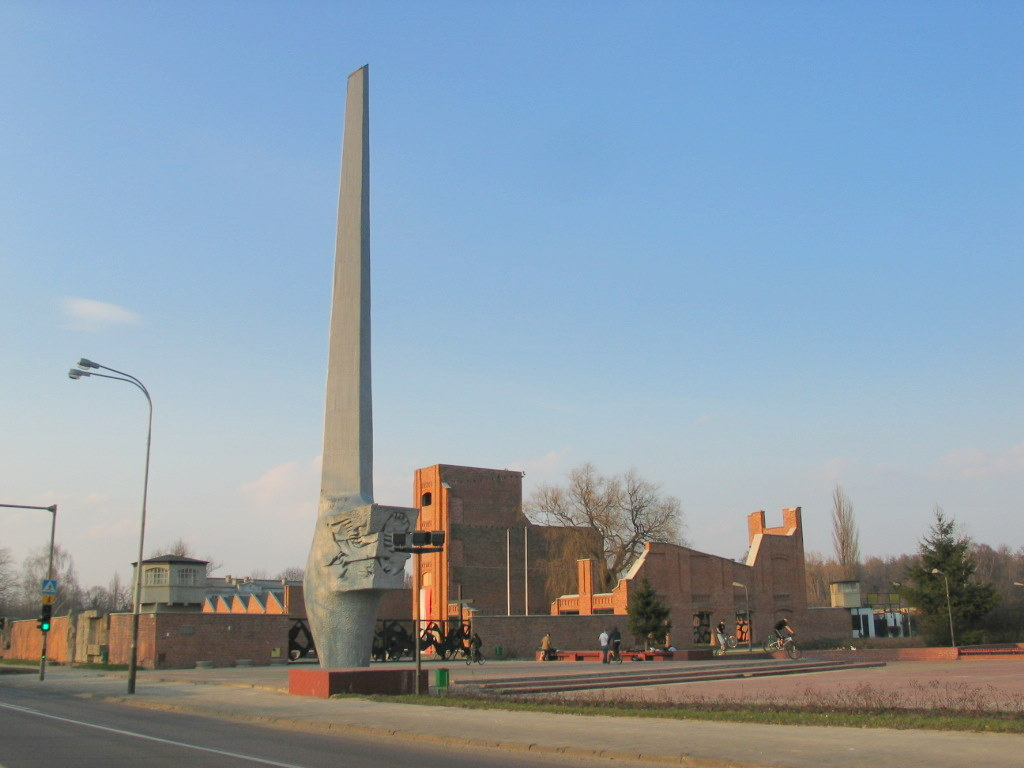
Radogoszcz mauzoleum

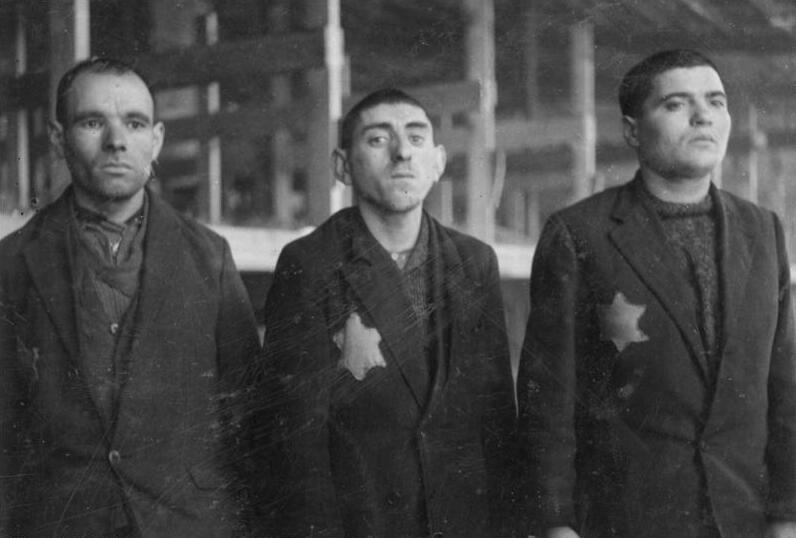
Jewish prisoners of Radogoszcz KZ

During World War II, the Radogoszcz prison was a German Order Police and Gestapo prison in Łódź (German: Erweitertes Polizeigefängnis, Radegast), used by the German authorities during the German occupation of Poland in 1939–1945. Today, it is a site of the museum commemorating its wartime victims.

== Establishment ==
The physical building dates from the early 1930s, when Samuel Abbe built a factory in village Radogoszcz (now Zgierska Street in Łódź). It was 4 storey factory building with an adjoining 1 storey factory floor. One month before the Nazi occupation, in August 1939, the Polish Army took control of the building.

== Use as a prison ==
Radogoszcz was used as a Nazi Police Prison from November 1939. It was used to house prisoners for the many German groups such as the Gestapo, SS, and newly formed local Police. The first murders of Radogoszcz prisoners took place soon after it was opened, when Polish intelligentsia (who had been arrested earlier) were taken from the prison and murdered in local woods, probably as part of the Intelligenzaktion (see Intelligenzaktion Litzmannstadt and Intelligenzaktion Burgerbraukeller). This took place in November 1939. As the factory was never intended for habitation, a local charity was formed to build simple kitchens and baths. The charity was prevented from aiding the prisoners after January 1940. A number of prominent Polish-German factory owners were on this committee.

The prison originally housed all types of prisoners including Jews. After a ransom of 150 marks per prisoner was paid, all Jewish prisoners were moved to the Lodz Ghetto. The crime of these prisoners was mostly to be unable to buy their freedom when they were randomly arrested. After January 1940 it exclusively housed male prisoners. Prior to that, it had been used as a transit camp for Poles being deported to the General Government area. Afterward it was populated by prisoners transferred from a prison at 55 Krakowska street.

In July 1940, once all transit prisoners had been moved, the prison came under the exclusive authority of the local police. By this time some 500 of the 2000 prisoners had been executed. The prison was mainly staffed by Local Poles of German descent who had signed the list to be declared Volksdeutsche. The prison was used for short- and long-term detention. Some prisoners were later sent to slave labour camps and concentration camps. In total, over 40,000 people passed through the gates of the prison. Nobody knows how many died.

=== Final atrocities ===
As Łódź was about to be overrun by the Red Army, the prison staff began to exterminate all the prisoners. After they began shooting the sick in the hospital they experienced resistance, and decided to lock the entire building and set it alight. Of the 1,500 prisoners in the 4 storey part of the building that was burned, only 30 survived, many in a water tank on the top floor.

The only person convicted of crimes committed at the prison was the commandant Walther Pelzhausen who was captured in the American Zone. He was executed in 1948.

== The museum ==
Today, Radogoszcz prison is the site of a museum commemorating its wartime victims. The museum is a branch of the state-owned Museum of Poland's Independence Traditions in Łódź (pl) founded originally in 1959 and renamed in 1990 following the collapse of Communism.

== Bibliography ==
- R. Iwanicki, G. Janaszek, and A. Rukowiecki, Lodzer Martyrologium. Museumsführer Radogoszcz – Museum und Gedankstätte, Lodz 2005, Museum der Unabhängigkeitsbewegung Lodz, Abteilung Radogoszcz.
- R. Iwanicki, G. Janaszek, and A. Rukowiecki, A Book of Lodz Martyrdom, a Guide to Radogoszcz and Sites of National Remembrance, translated by K Ojrzynska-Stasiak, redaction by H Siemenski, Museum of the Independence Traditions of Lodz, 2005 ISBN 83-907422-2-5
- Maria Nowacka, "Radogoszcz", Łódź 1948
- Stanisław Rapalski, "Byłem w piekle. Wspomnienia z Radogoszcza", Wyd. Łódzkie, Łódź 1960.
- Mirosław Cygański, "Z dziejów okupacji hitlerowskiej w Łodzi, 1939 –1945", Łódź 1965
- Stanisław Lewicki, "Radogoszcz", Warszawa 1971
