= Czerniaków (disambiguation) =

Czerniaków is a neighbourhood in Warsaw, Poland.

Czerniaków may also refer to:

- Czerniaków, Łódź Voivodeship, a village in central Poland
- Adam Czerniaków (1880–1942), a Polish–Jewish engineer
