= Chlewo, Łódź Voivodeship =

Chlewo
- Village
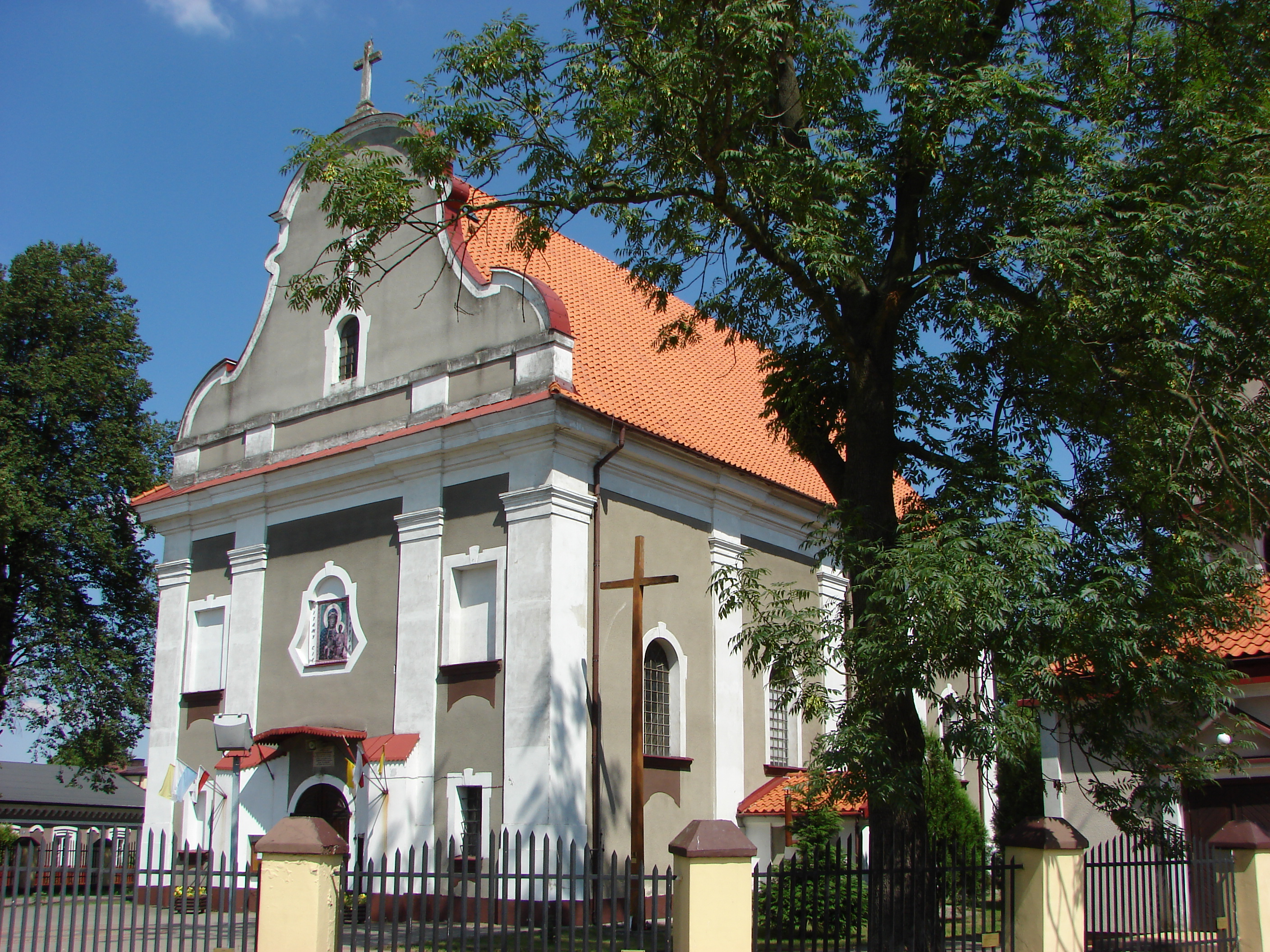
- St. Benedict church, built 1778-1788

- Location within Poland
- Coordinates: 51°45′3″N 18°27′49″E
- Country: Poland
- Voivodeship: Łódź
- County: Sieradz
- Gmina: Goszczanów

Chlewo [ˈxlɛvɔ] is a village in the administrative district of Gmina Goszczanów, within Sieradz County, Łódź Voivodeship, in central Poland.
