= Stojanów =

Stojanów may refer to the following places in Poland:

- Stojanów, Lower Silesian Voivodeship (south-west Poland)
- Stojanów, Łódź Voivodeship (central Poland)
