= Wilkszyce =

- Village
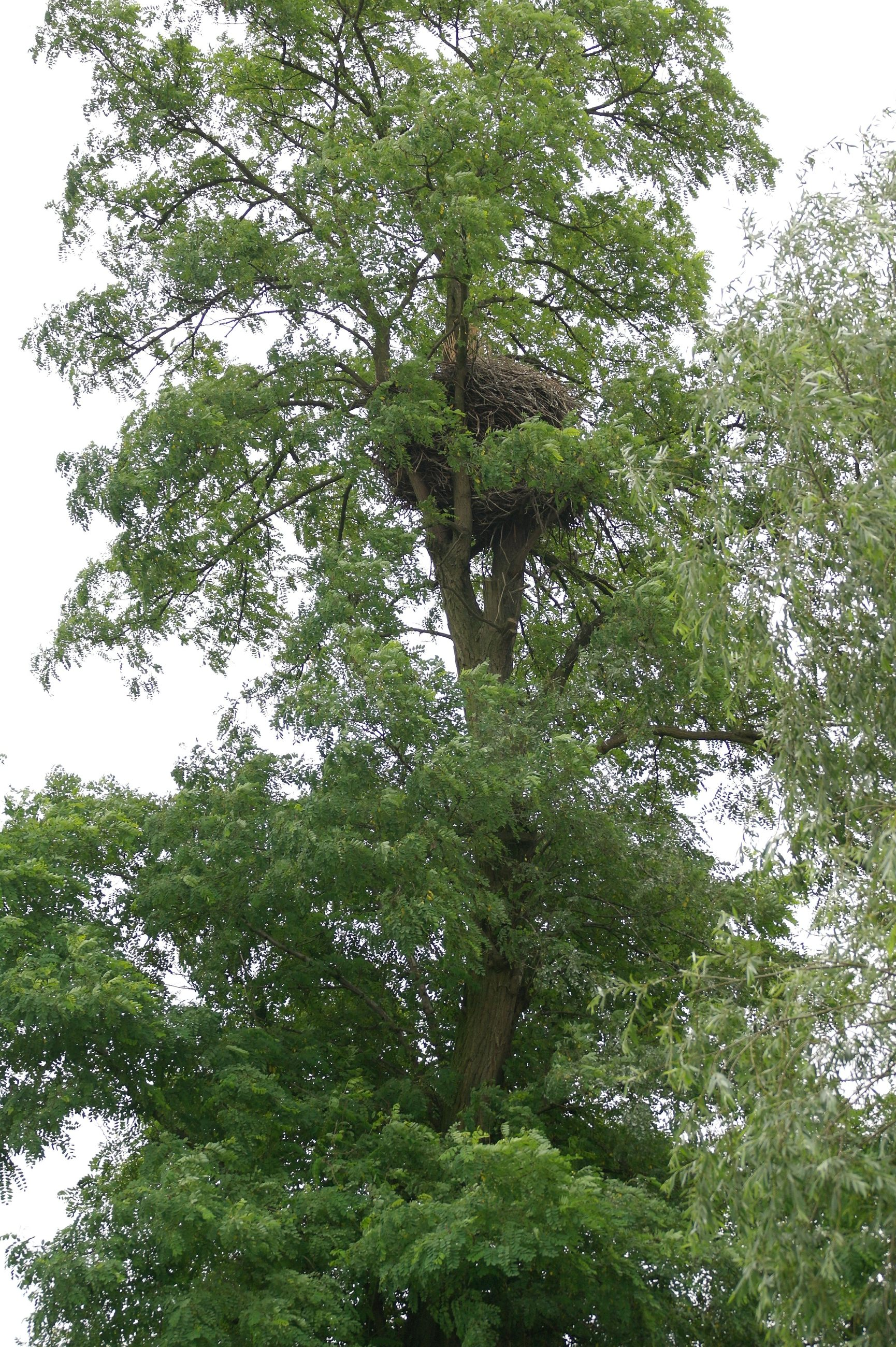

- Location within Poland
- Coordinates: 51°44′5″N 18°29′33″E
- Country: Poland
- Voivodeship: Łódź
- County: Sieradz
- Gmina: Goszczanów

Wilkszyce [vilkˈʂɨt͡sɛ] is a village in the administrative district of Gmina Goszczanów, within Sieradz County, Łódź Voivodeship, in central Poland.
