= Sulmów =

- Village
- Location within Poland
- Coordinates: 51°47′16″N 18°27′23″E
- Country: Poland
- Voivodeship: Łódź
- County: Sieradz
- Gmina: Goszczanów

Sulmów [ˈsulmuf] is a village in the administrative district of Gmina Goszczanów, within Sieradz County, Łódź Voivodeship, in central Poland.
