= Lipicze Górne =

- Village
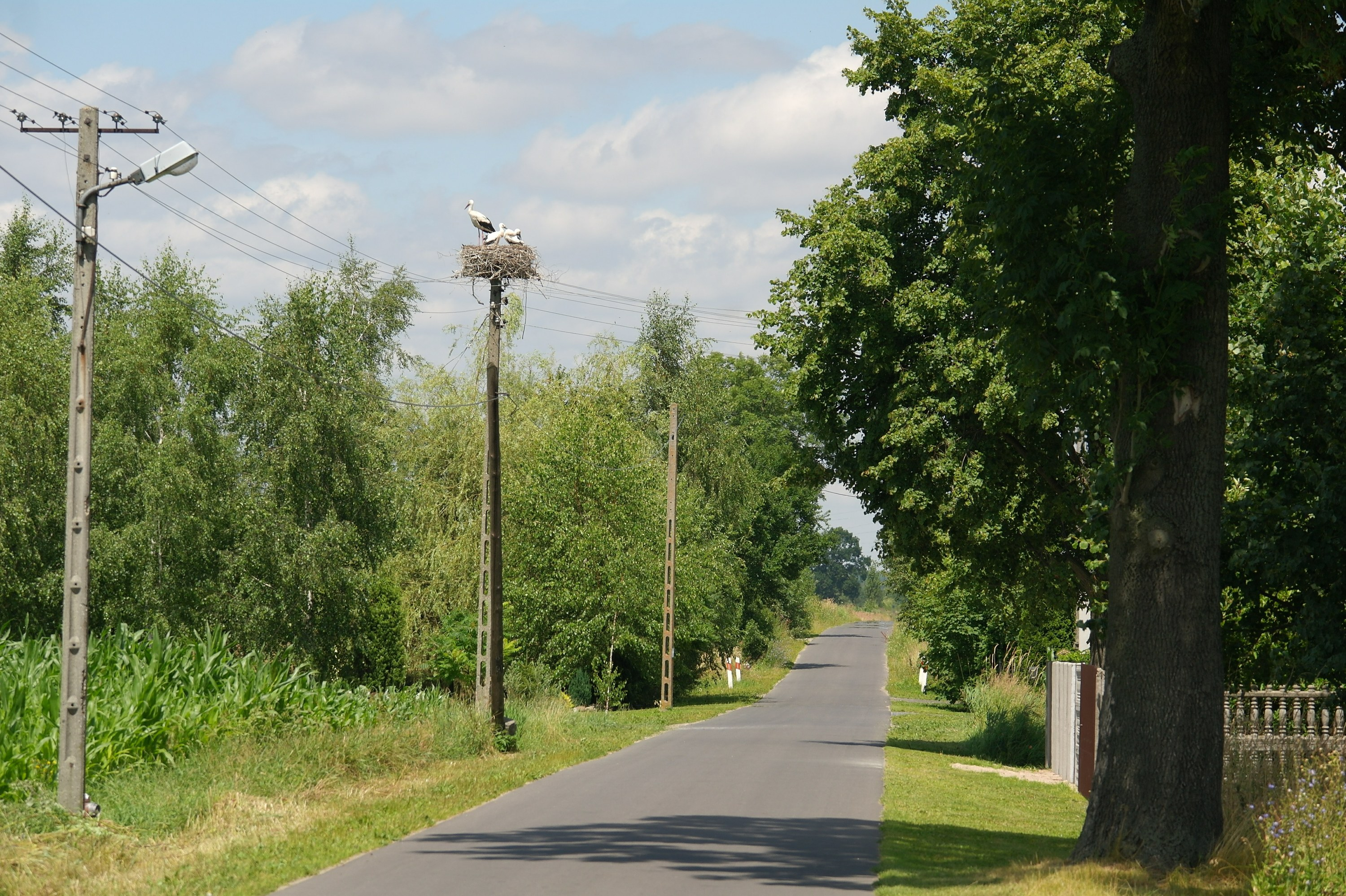

- Location within Poland
- Coordinates: 51°50′19″N 18°30′14″E
- Country: Poland
- Voivodeship: Łódź
- County: Sieradz
- Gmina: Goszczanów

Lipicze Górne [liˈpit͡ʂɛ ˈɡurnɛ] is a village in the administrative district of Gmina Goszczanów, within Sieradz County, Łódź Voivodeship, in central Poland.
