= Gmina Goszczanów =

Gmina Goszczanów Goszczanów Commune
- Gmina

- Flag Coat of arms
- Interactive map of Gmina Goszczanów
- Coordinates (Goszczanów): 51°47′21″N 18°30′17″E
- Country: Poland
- Voivodeship: Łódź
- County: Sieradz
- Seat: Goszczanów

Area
  - Total: 123,301 km^{2} (47,607 sq mi)

Population (2006)
  - Total: 5,814
  - Density: 0.04715/km^{2} (0.1221/sq mi)
- Time zone: UTC+1 (CET)
  - Summer (DST): UTC+2 (CEST)
- Car plates: ESI
- Website: www.goszczanow.com

Gmina Goszczanów is a rural gmina (administrative district) in Sieradz County, Łódź Voivodeship, in central Poland. Its seat is the village of Goszczanów, which lies approximately 27 kilometres (17 mi) north-west of Sieradz and 67 km (42 mi) west of the regional capital Łódź.

The gmina covers an area of 123.301 square kilometres (47.6 sq mi), and as of 2006 its total population is 5,814.

== Villages ==
Gmina Goszczanów contains the villages and settlements of:

- Chlewo
- Chwalęcice
- Czerniaków
- Gawłowice
- Goszczanów
- Karolina
- Kaszew
- Klonów
- Lipicze Górne
- Lipicze Olendry
- Lipicze W
- Poniatów
- Poniatówek
- Poprężniki
- Poradzew
- Rzężawy
- Sokołów
- Stojanów
- Strachanów
- Sulmów
- Sulmówek
- Świnice Kaliskie
- Wacławów
- Waliszewice
- Wilczków
- Wilkszyce
- Wola Tłomakowa
- Wroniawy
- Ziemięcin

== Neighbouring gminas ==
Gmina Goszczanów is bordered by the gminas of Błaszki, Dobra, Kawęczyn, Koźminek, Lisków, Szczytniki and Warta.
