= Świnice Kaliskie =

- Village
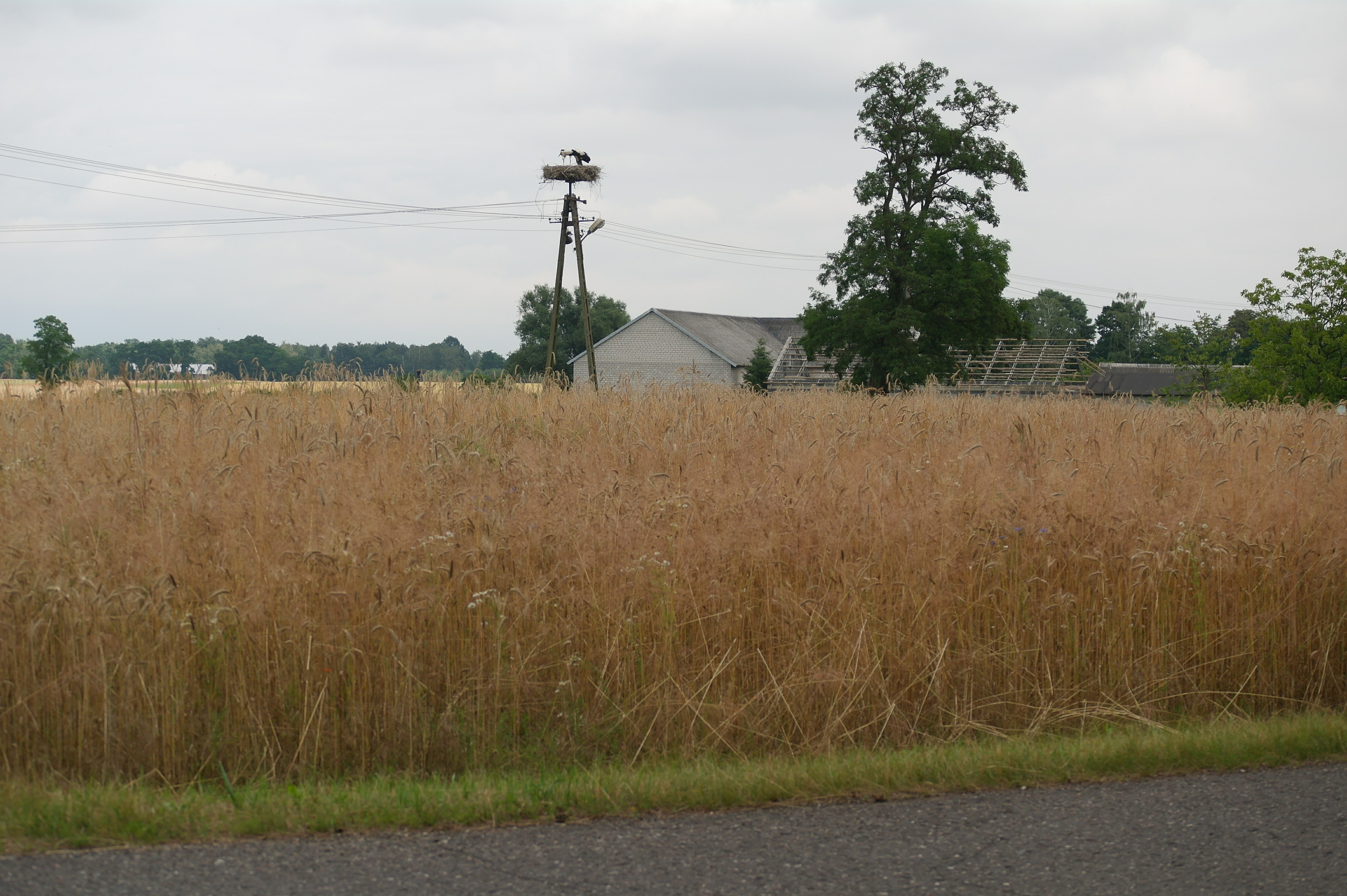

- Location within Poland
- Coordinates: 51°45′42″N 18°26′39″E
- Country: Poland
- Voivodeship: Łódź
- County: Sieradz
- Gmina: Goszczanów

Świnice Kaliskie [ɕfiˈnit͡sɛ kaˈliskʲɛ] is a village in the administrative district of Gmina Goszczanów, within Sieradz County, Łódź Voivodeship, in central Poland.
