= Waliszewice =

- Village
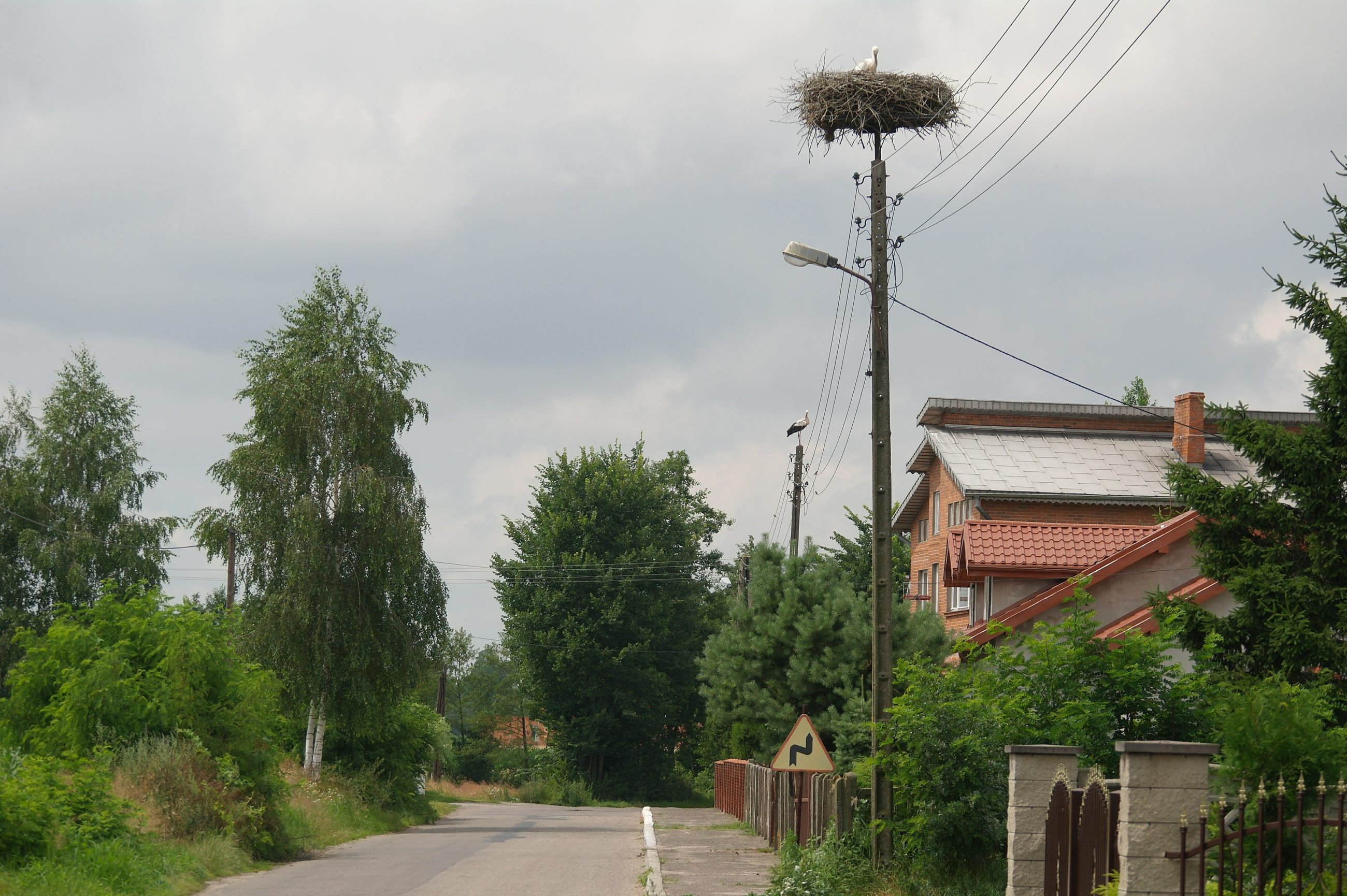

- Location within Poland
- Coordinates: 51°44′46″N 18°25′49″E
- Country: Poland
- Voivodeship: Łódź
- County: Sieradz
- Gmina: Goszczanów

Waliszewice [valiʂɛˈvit͡sɛ] is a village in the administrative district of Gmina Goszczanów, within Sieradz County, Łódź Voivodeship, in central Poland.
