= Strachanów =

- Village
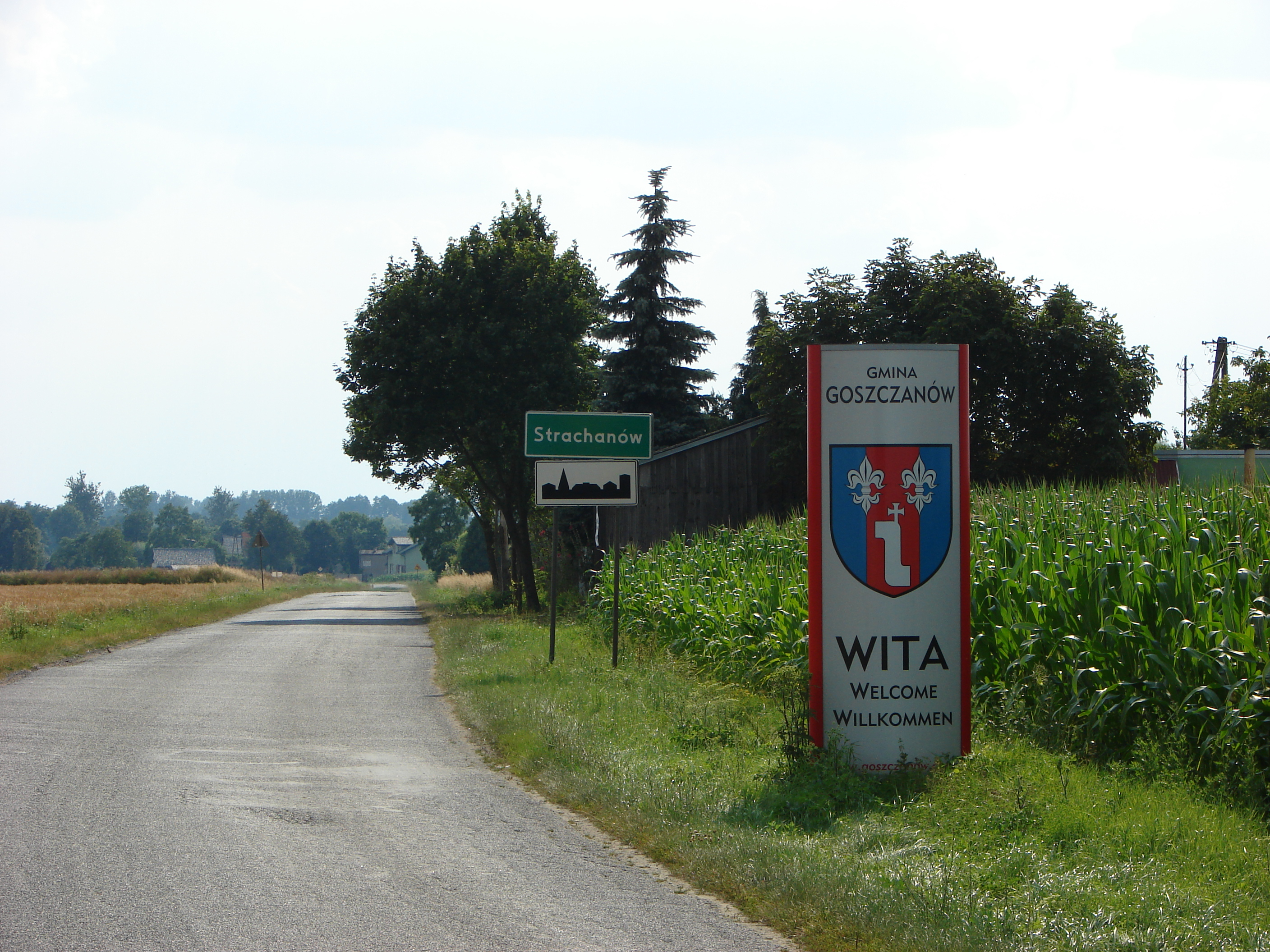

- Location within Poland
- Coordinates: 51°51′N 18°39′E
- Country: Poland
- Voivodeship: Łódź
- County: Sieradz
- Gmina: Goszczanów

Strachanów [straˈxanuf] is a village in the administrative district of Gmina Goszczanów, within Sieradz County, Łódź Voivodeship, in central Poland.
