= Rzężawy, Łódź Voivodeship =

Rzężawy
- Village
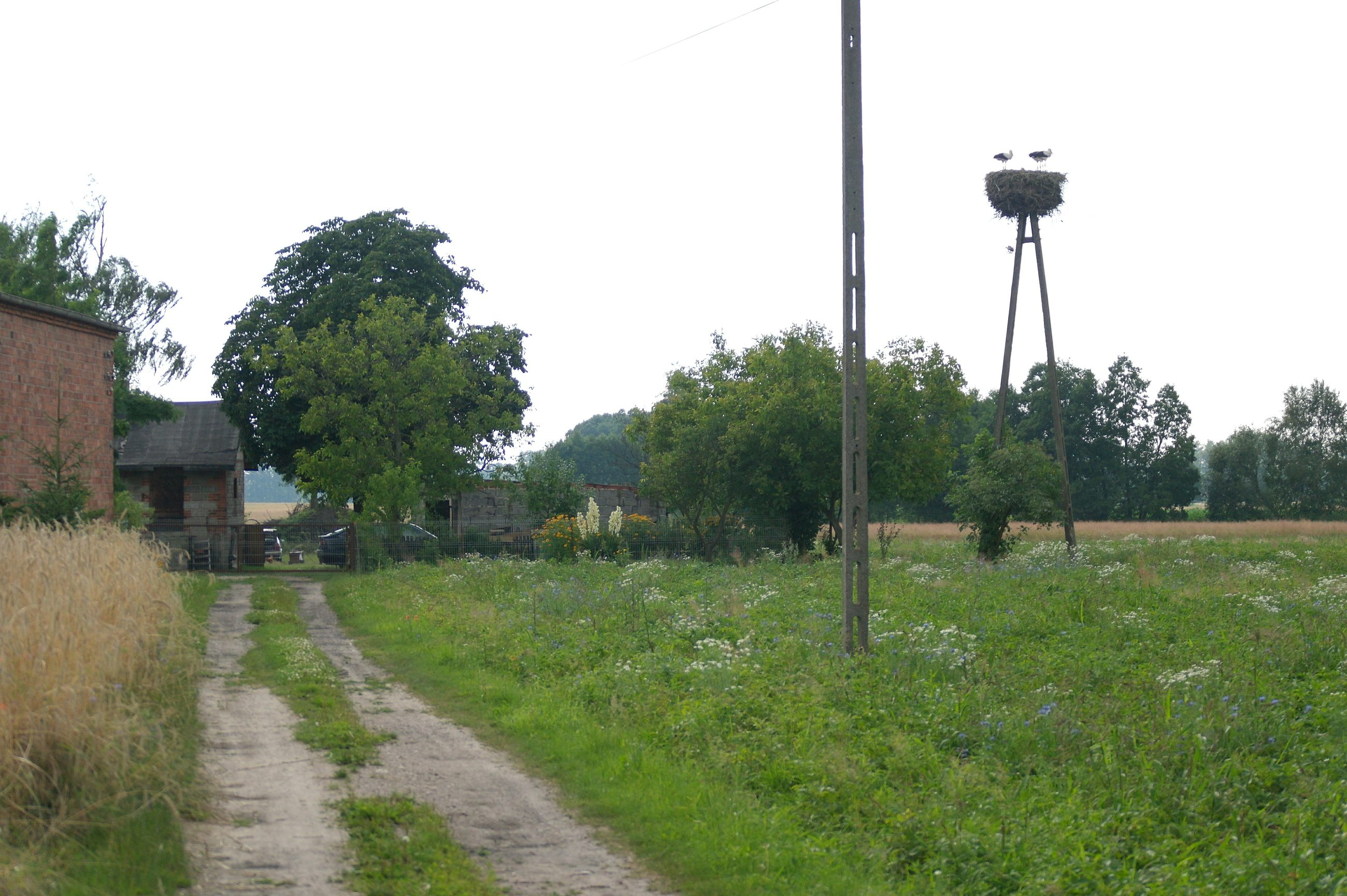

- Location within Poland
- Coordinates: 51°45′39″N 18°29′6″E
- Country: Poland
- Voivodeship: Łódź
- County: Sieradz
- Gmina: Goszczanów

Rzężawy [ʐɛ̃ˈʐavɨ] is a village in the administrative district of Gmina Goszczanów, within Sieradz County, Łódź Voivodeship, in central Poland.
