= Wacławów, Sieradz County =

Wacławów
- Village
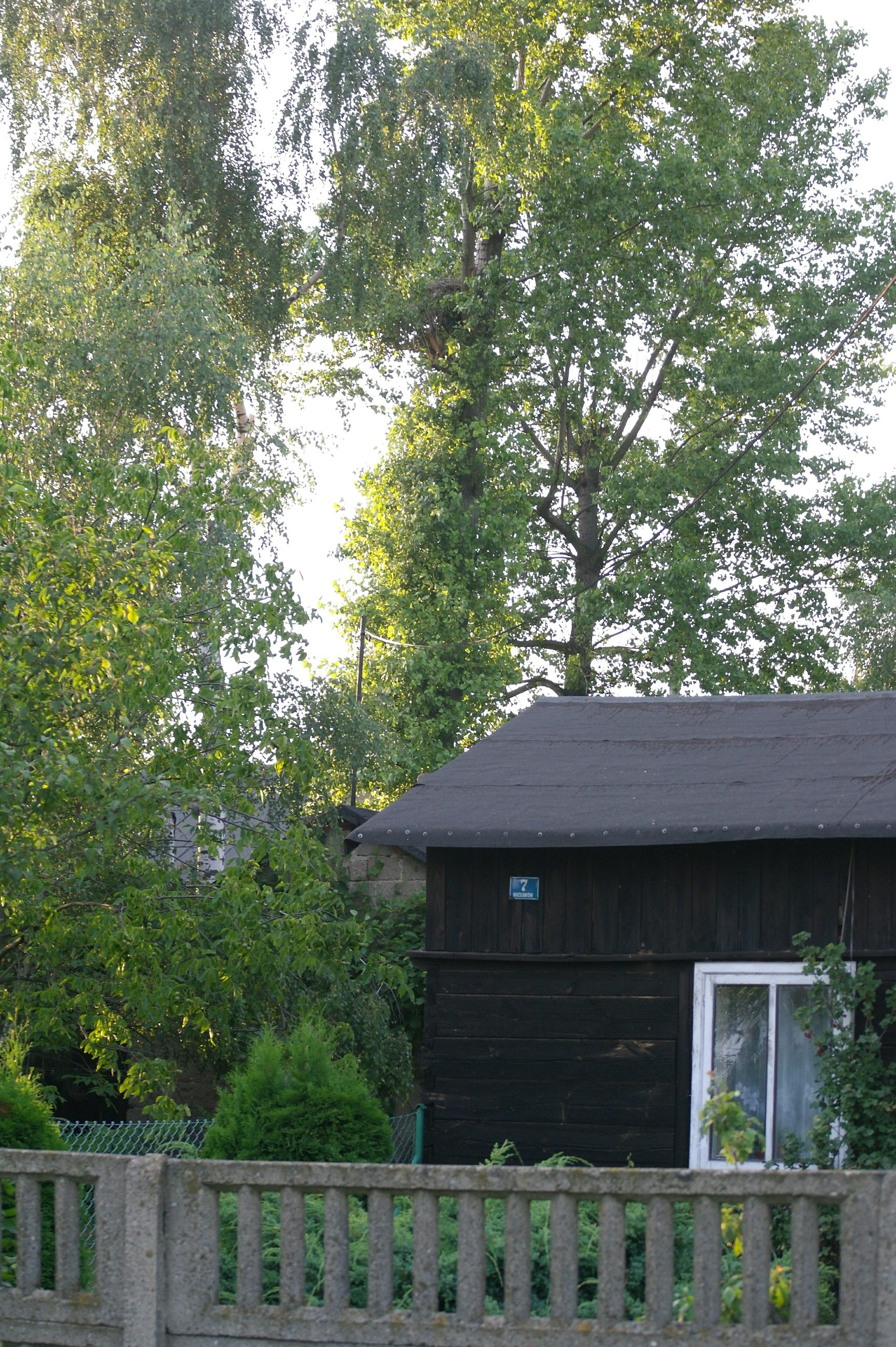

- Location within Poland
- Coordinates: 51°45′18″N 18°32′26″E
- Country: Poland
- Voivodeship: Łódź
- County: Sieradz
- Gmina: Goszczanów

Wacławów [vat͡sˈwavuf] is a village in the administrative district of Gmina Goszczanów, within Sieradz County, Łódź Voivodeship, in central Poland.
