= Klonów, Łódź Voivodeship =

Klonów
- Village
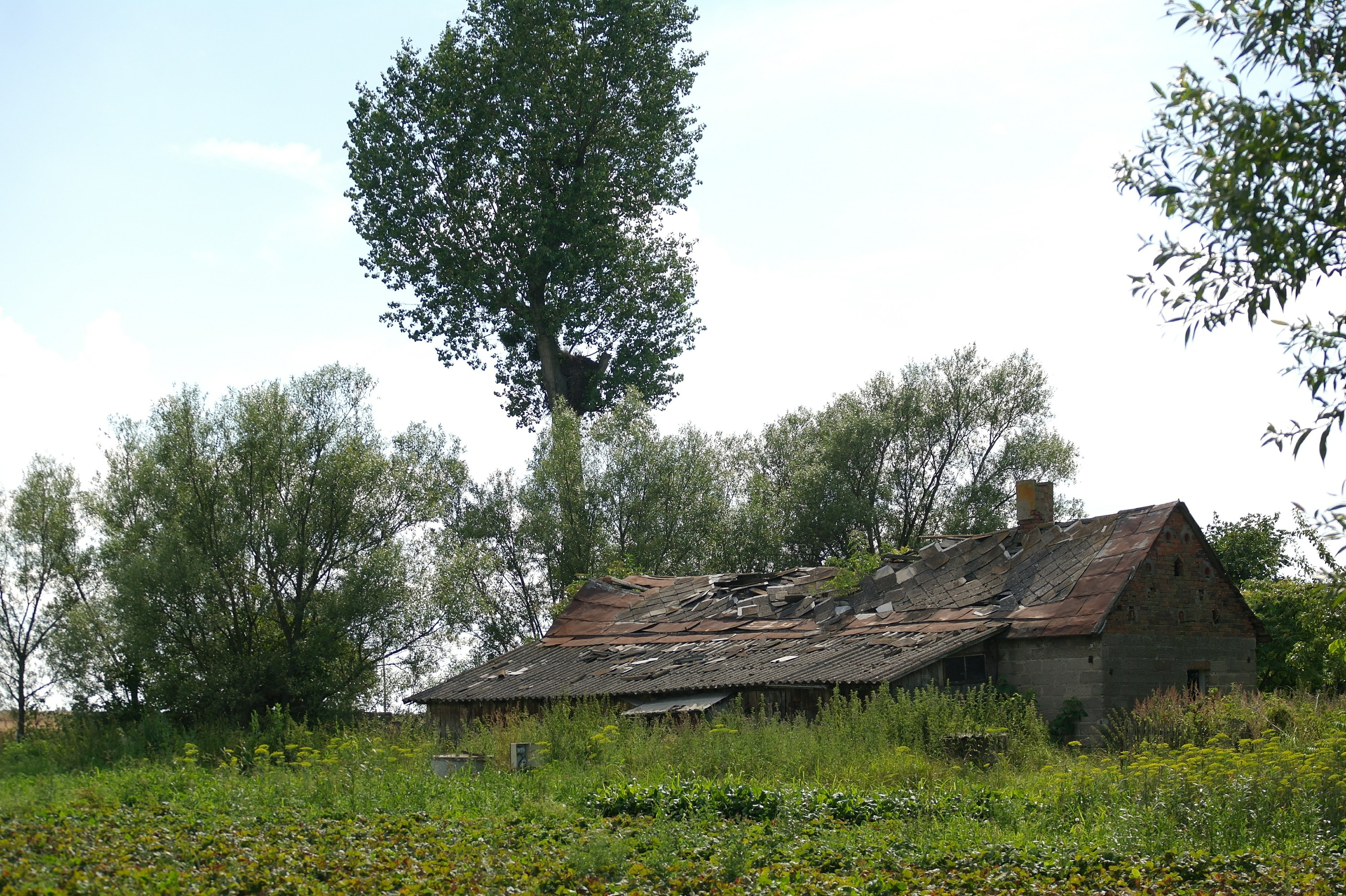

- Location within Poland
- Coordinates: 51°49′13″N 18°34′29″E
- Country: Poland
- Voivodeship: Łódź
- County: Sieradz
- Gmina: Goszczanów
- Population (approx.): 120

Klonów [ˈklɔnuf] is a village in the administrative district of Gmina Goszczanów, within Sieradz County, Łódź Voivodeship, in central Poland.

The village has an approximate population of 120.
