= Kaszew =

- Village
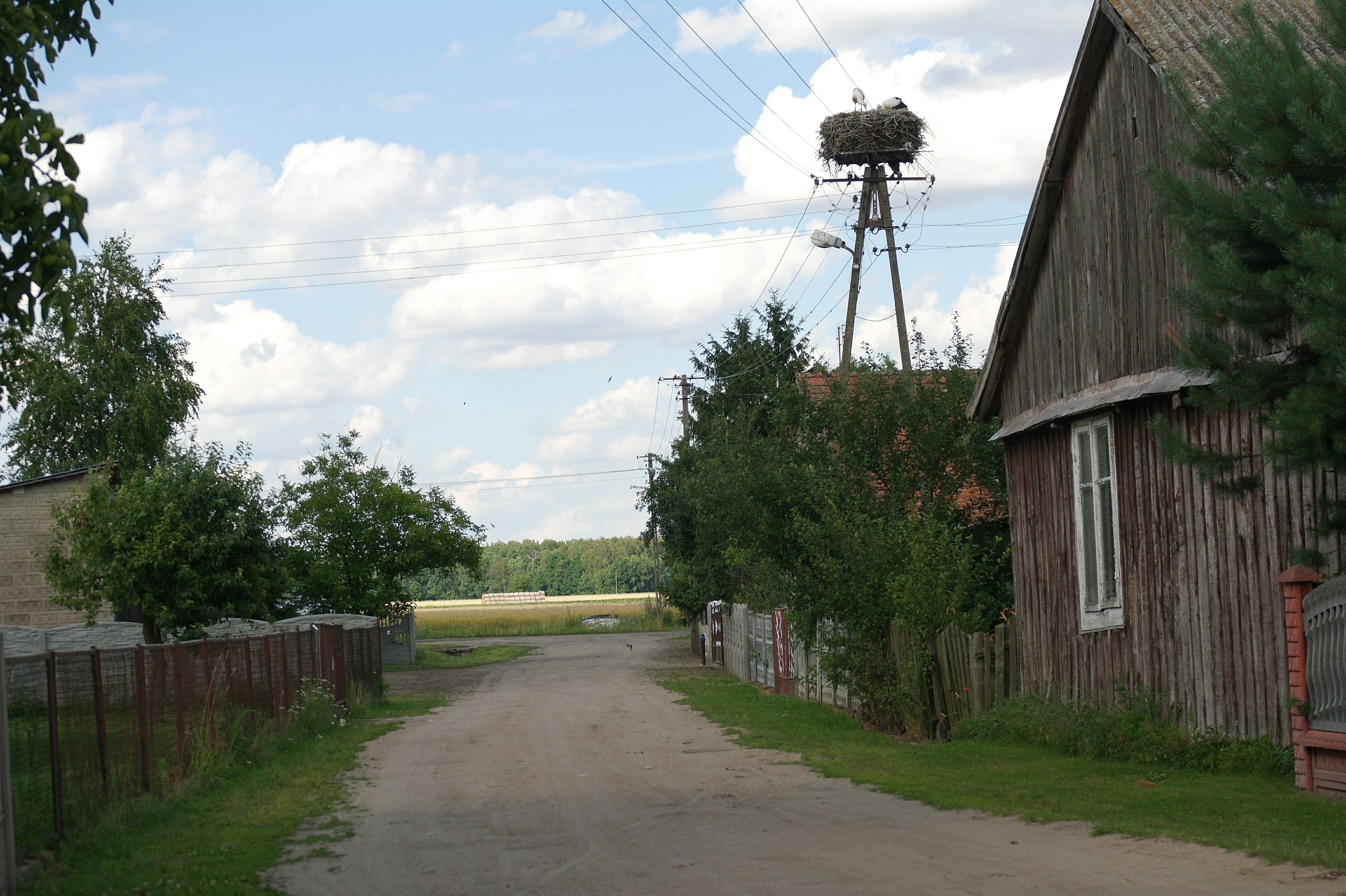

- Location within Poland
- Coordinates: 51°48′55″N 18°32′4″E
- Country: Poland
- Voivodeship: Łódź
- County: Sieradz
- Gmina: Goszczanów

Kaszew [ˈkaʂɛf] is a village in the administrative district of Gmina Goszczanów, within Sieradz County, Łódź Voivodeship, in central Poland.
