= Poprężniki =

- Village
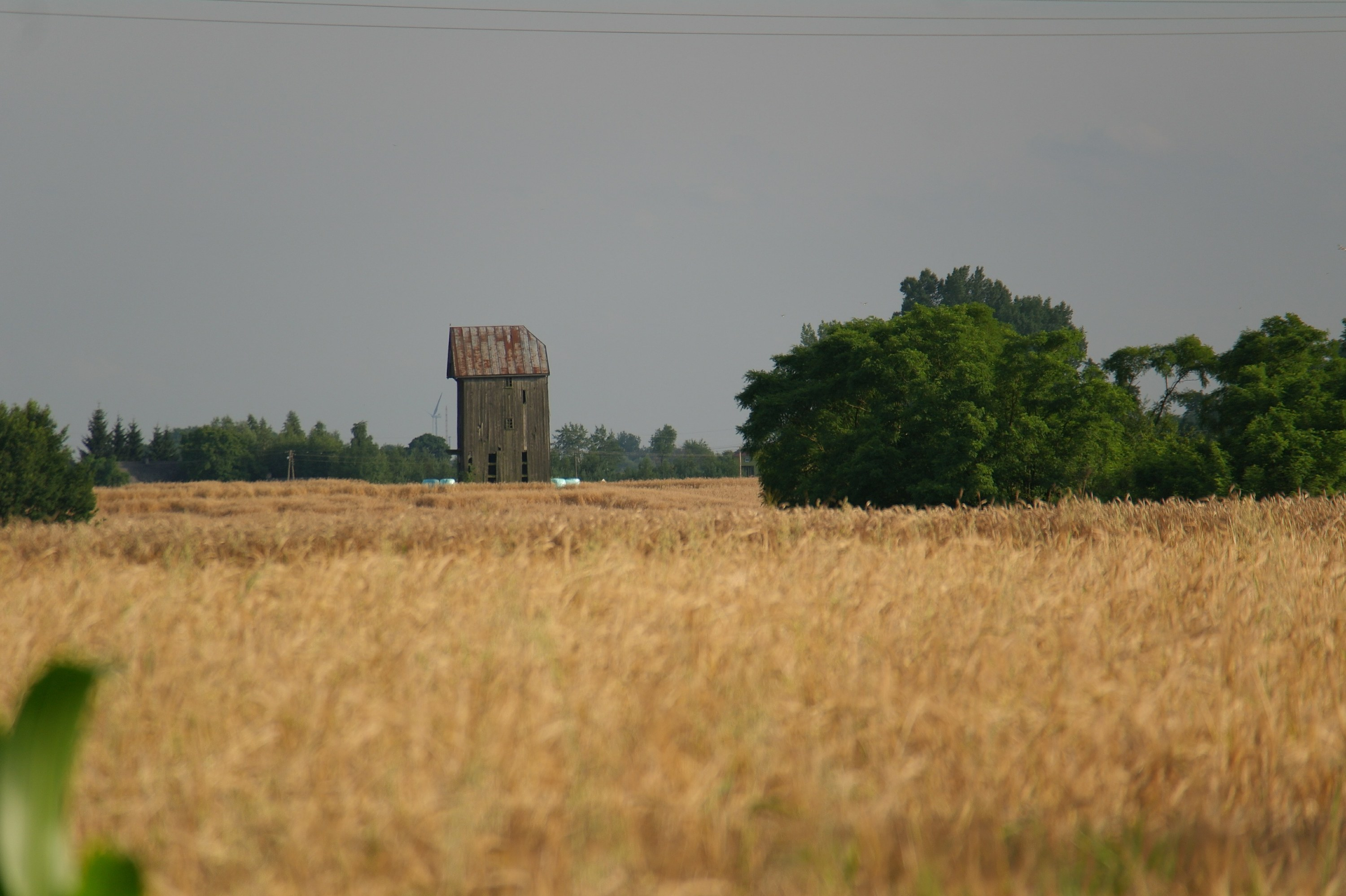

- Location within Poland
- Coordinates: 51°46′N 18°34′E
- Country: Poland
- Voivodeship: Łódź
- County: Sieradz
- Gmina: Goszczanów

Poprężniki [pɔprɛ̃ʐˈniki] is a village in the administrative district of Gmina Goszczanów, within Sieradz County, Łódź Voivodeship, in central Poland.
