= Gawłowice, Łódź Voivodeship =

Gawłowice
- Village
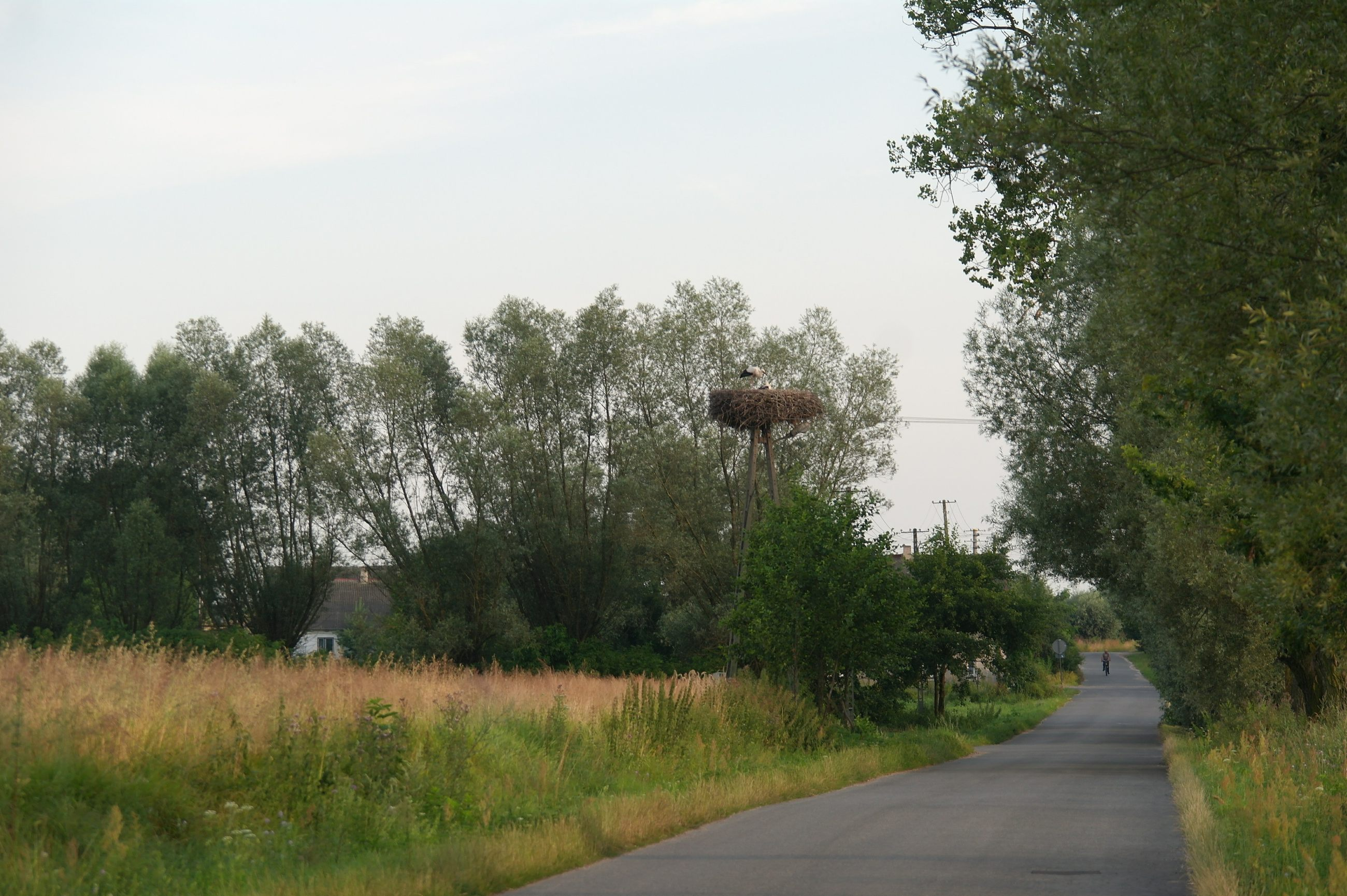

- Location within Poland
- Coordinates: 51°46′5″N 18°32′48″E
- Country: Poland
- Voivodeship: Łódź
- County: Sieradz
- Gmina: Goszczanów

Gawłowice [ɡavwɔˈvit͡sɛ] is a village in the administrative district of Gmina Goszczanów, within Sieradz County, Łódź Voivodeship, in central Poland.
