= Lipicze Olendry =

- Village
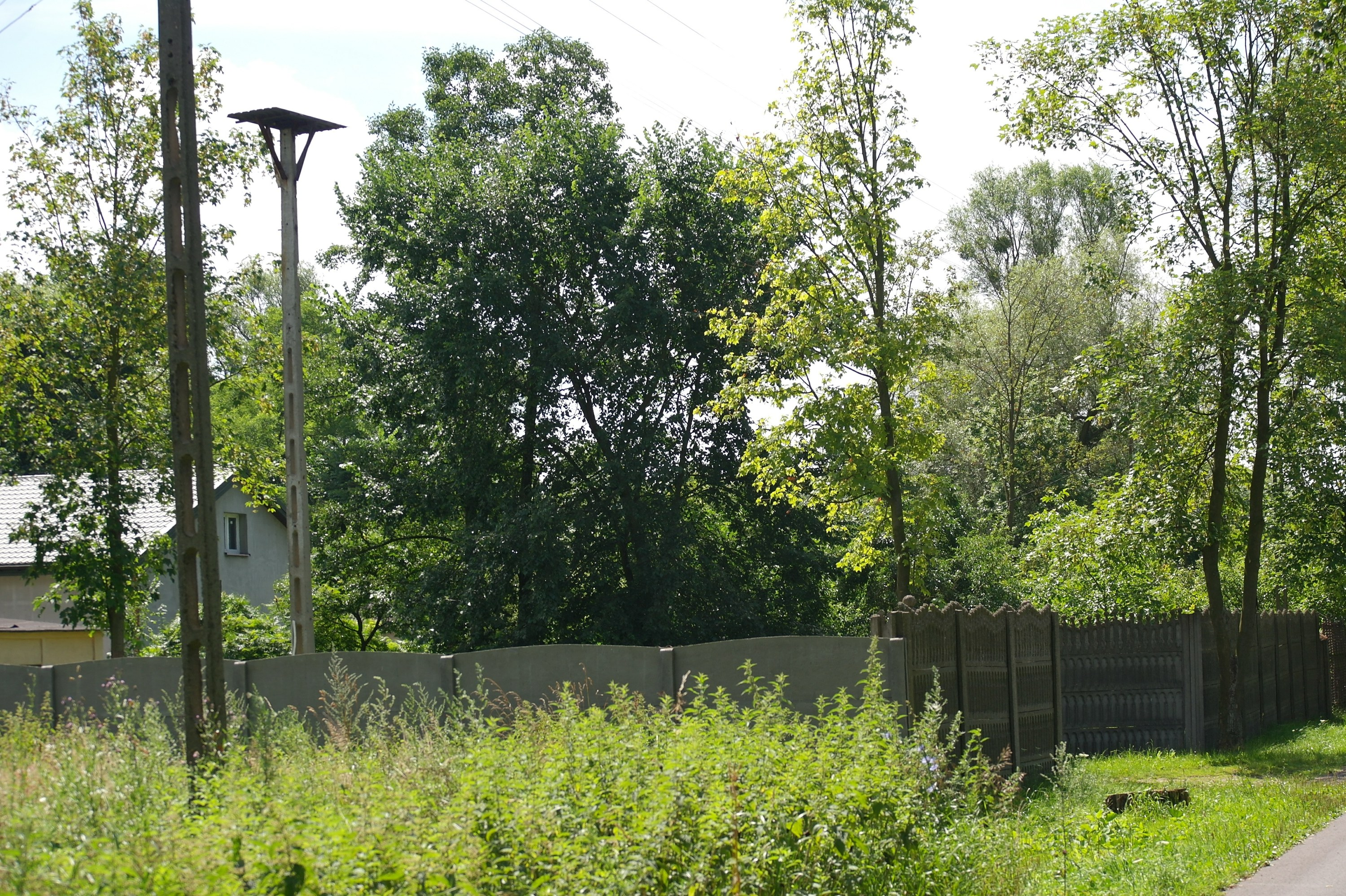

- Location within Poland
- Coordinates: 51°50′0″N 18°28′17″E
- Country: Poland
- Voivodeship: Łódź
- County: Sieradz
- Gmina: Goszczanów

Lipicze Olendry [liˈpit͡ʂɛ ɔˈlɛndrɨ] is a village in the administrative district of Gmina Goszczanów, within Sieradz County, Łódź Voivodeship, in central Poland.
