= Sokołów, Gmina Goszczanów =

Sokołów
- Village
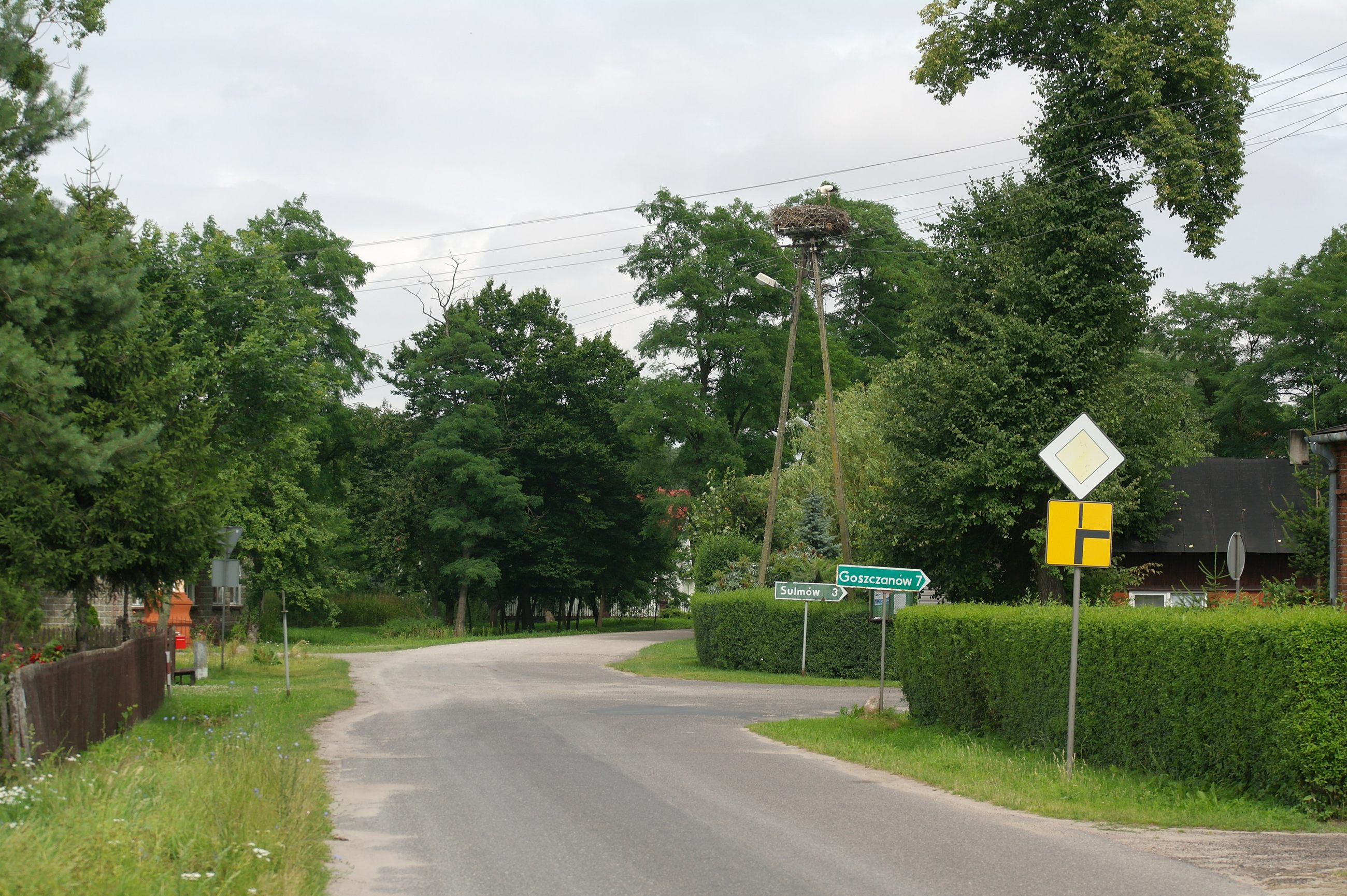

- Location within Poland
- Coordinates: 51°48′34″N 18°27′6″E
- Country: Poland
- Voivodeship: Łódź
- County: Sieradz
- Gmina: Goszczanów

Sokołów [sɔˈkɔwuf] is a village in the administrative district of Gmina Goszczanów, within Sieradz County, Łódź Voivodeship, in central Poland.
