= Karolina, Łódź Voivodeship =

Karolina
- Village
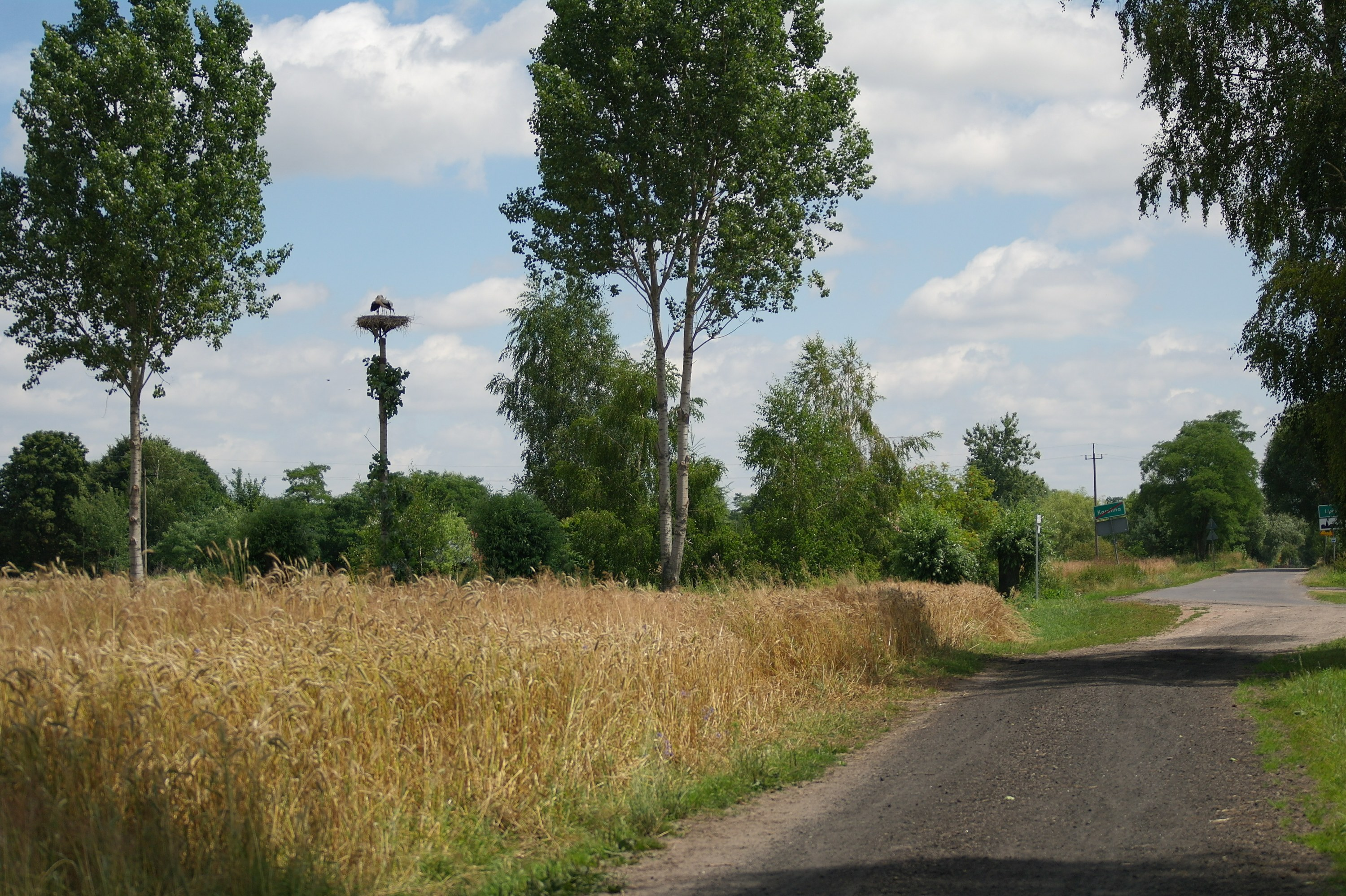

- Location within Poland
- Coordinates: 51°49′30″N 18°28′15″E
- Country: Poland
- Voivodeship: Łódź
- County: Sieradz
- Gmina: Goszczanów

Karolina [karɔˈlina] is a village in the administrative district of Gmina Goszczanów, within Sieradz County, Łódź Voivodeship, in central Poland.
