= Poniatówek, Łódź Voivodeship =

Poniatówek
- Village
- Location within Poland
- Coordinates: 51°48′5″N 18°31′41″E
- Country: Poland
- Voivodeship: Łódź
- County: Sieradz
- Gmina: Goszczanów

Poniatówek [pɔɲaˈtuvɛk] is a village in the administrative district of Gmina Goszczanów, within Sieradz County, Łódź Voivodeship, in central Poland.
