= Ziemięcin, Łódź Voivodeship =

Ziemięcin
- Village
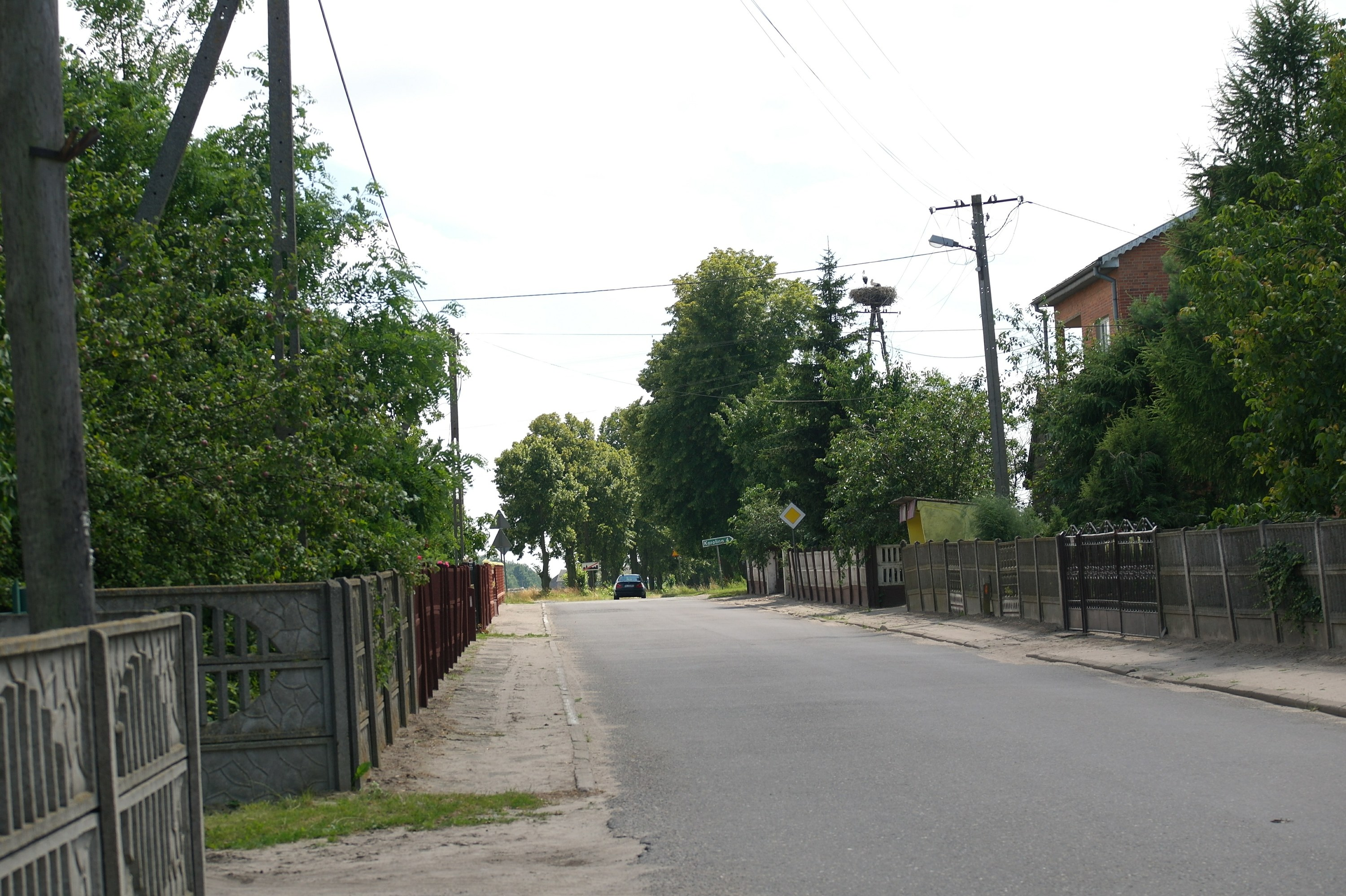

- Location within Poland
- Coordinates: 51°50′21″N 18°32′28″E
- Country: Poland
- Voivodeship: Łódź
- County: Sieradz
- Gmina: Goszczanów
- Elevation: 140 m (460 ft)

Ziemięcin [ʑɛˈmjɛnt͡ɕin] is a village in the administrative district of Gmina Goszczanów, within Sieradz County, Łódź Voivodeship, in central Poland.
