= Chwalęcice, Łódź Voivodeship =

Chwalęcice
- Village
- Location within Poland
- Coordinates: 51°45′N 18°27′E
- Country: Poland
- Voivodeship: Łódź
- County: Sieradz
- Gmina: Goszczanów

Chwalęcice [xfalɛnˈt͡ɕit͡sɛ] is a village in the administrative district of Gmina Goszczanów, within Sieradz County, Łódź Voivodeship, in central Poland.
