= Wilczków, Sieradz County =

Wilczków
- Village
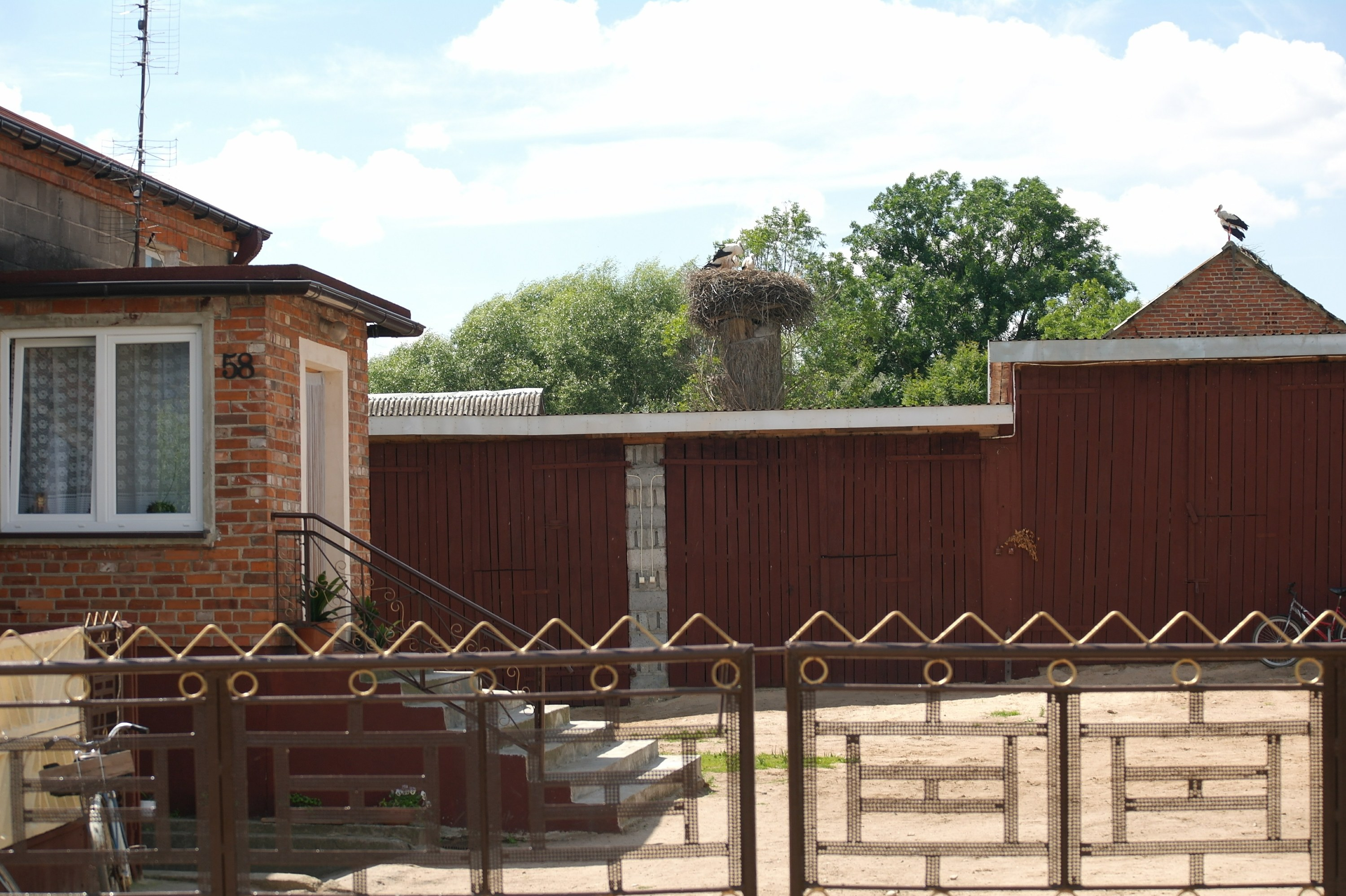

- Location within Poland
- Coordinates: 51°50′10″N 18°34′34″E
- Country: Poland
- Voivodeship: Łódź
- County: Sieradz
- Gmina: Goszczanów

Wilczków [ˈvilt͡ʂkuf] is a village in the administrative district of Gmina Goszczanów, within Sieradz County, Łódź Voivodeship, in central Poland.
