= Poniatów, Sieradz County =

Poniatów
- Village
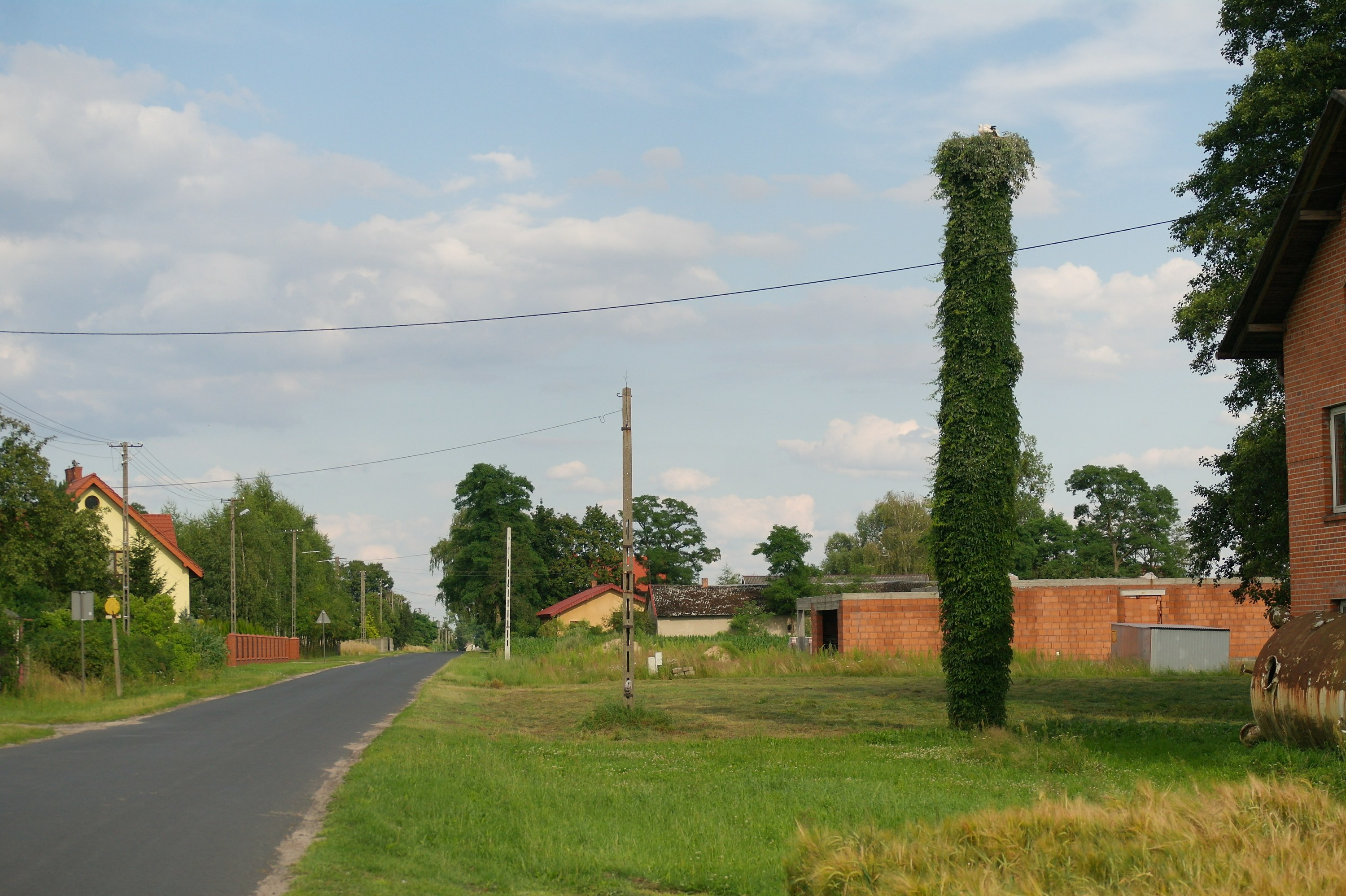

- Location within Poland
- Coordinates: 51°47′18″N 18°32′56″E
- Country: Poland
- Voivodeship: Łódź
- County: Sieradz
- Gmina: Goszczanów

Poniatów [pɔˈɲatuf] is a village in the administrative district of Gmina Goszczanów, within Sieradz County, Łódź Voivodeship, in central Poland.
