= Wroniawy, Łódź Voivodeship =

Wroniawy
- Village
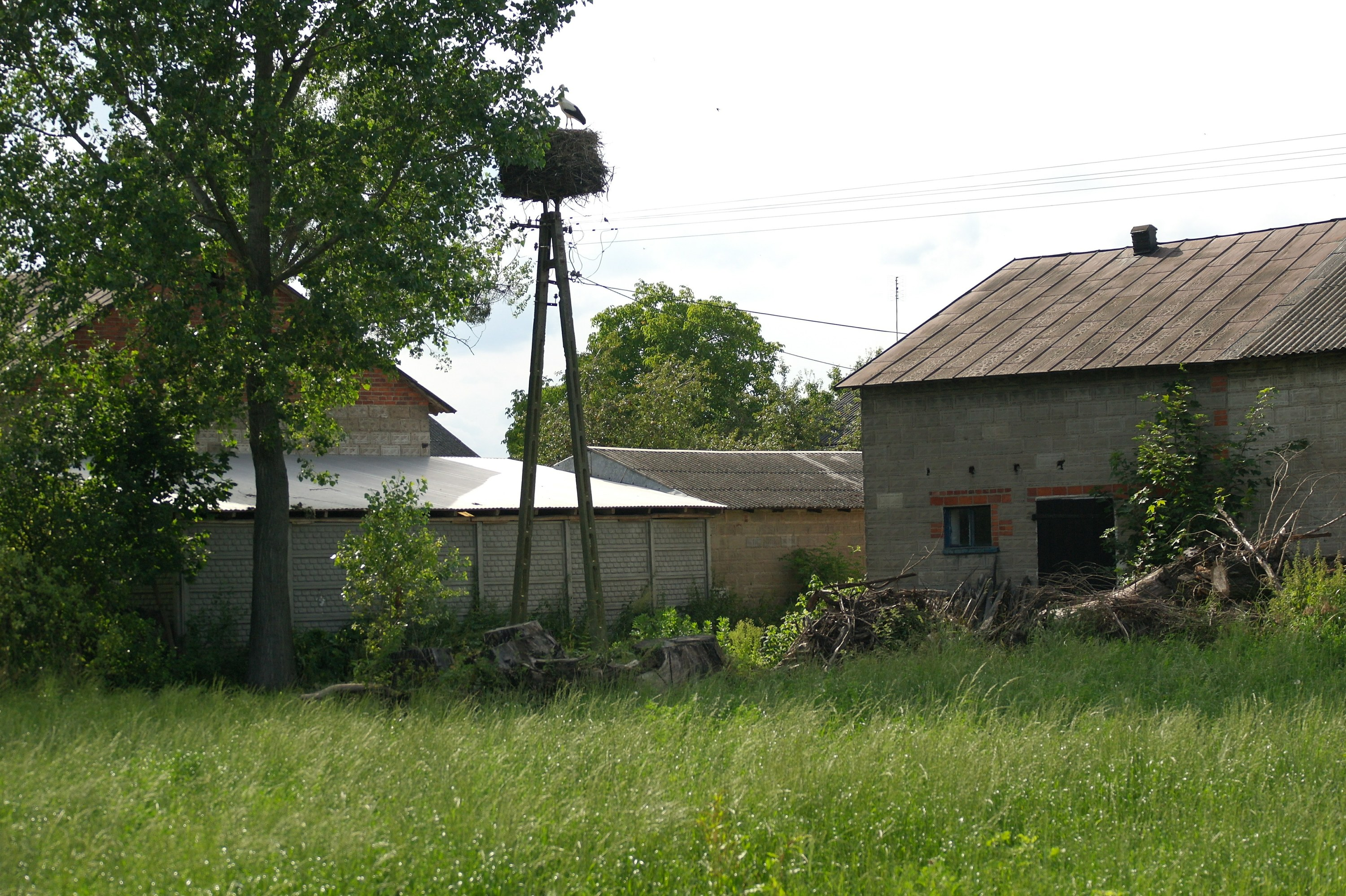

- Location within Poland
- Coordinates: 51°48′37″N 18°30′39″E
- Country: Poland
- Voivodeship: Łódź
- County: Sieradz
- Gmina: Goszczanów

Wroniawy [vrɔˈɲavɨ] is a village in the administrative district of Gmina Goszczanów, within Sieradz County, Łódź Voivodeship, in central Poland.
