= Czerniaków, Łódź Voivodeship =

Czerniaków
- Village
- Location within Poland
- Coordinates: 51°48′33″N 18°34′28″E
- Country: Poland
- Voivodeship: Łódź
- County: Sieradz
- Gmina: Goszczanów

Czerniaków [t͡ʂɛrˈɲakuf] is a village in the administrative district of Gmina Goszczanów, within Sieradz County, Łódź Voivodeship, in central Poland.
