= Stojanów, Łódź Voivodeship =

Stojanów
- Village
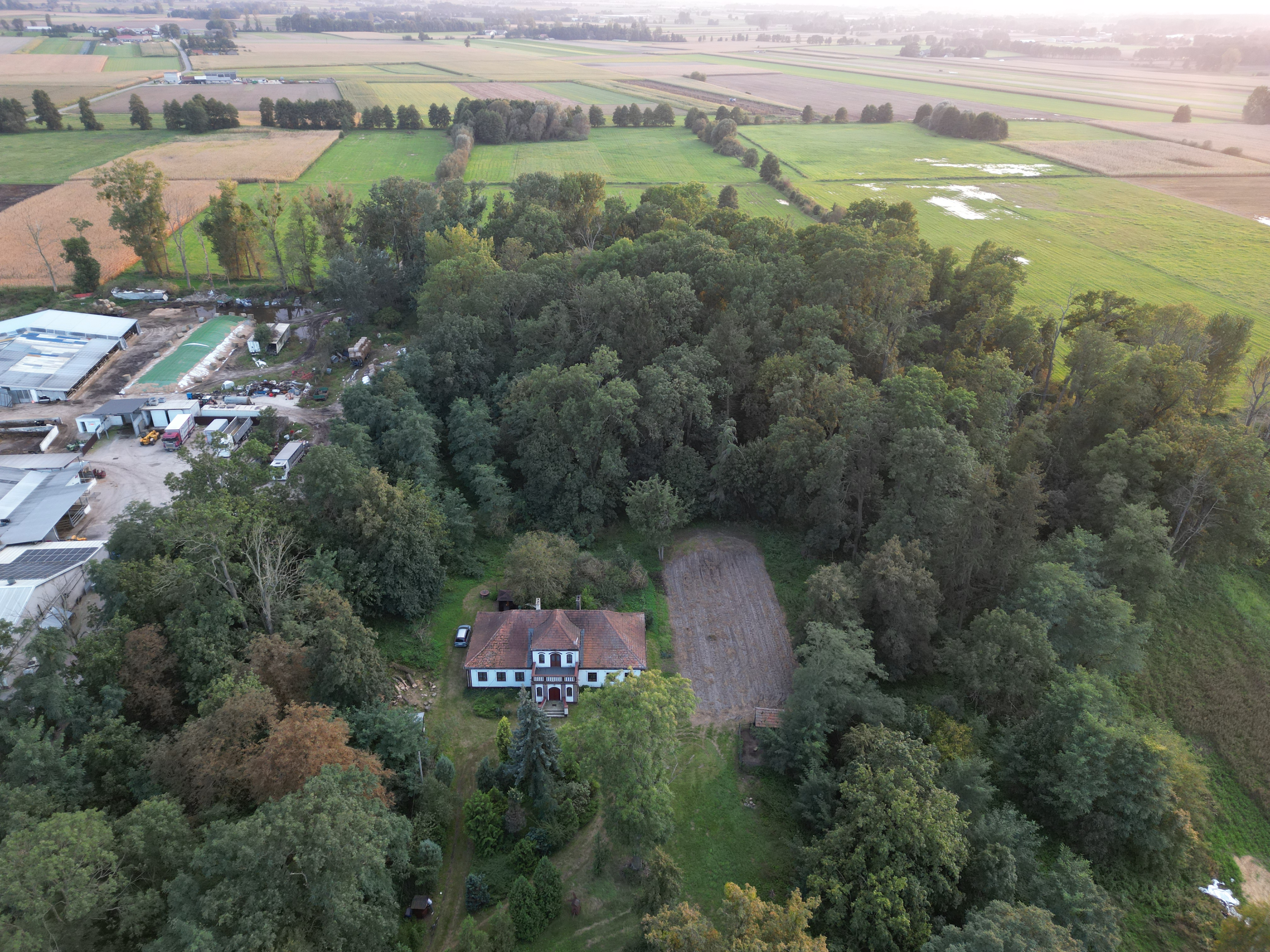
- dwór in Stojanów

- Location within Poland
- Coordinates: 51°45′58″N 18°29′44″E
- Country: Poland
- Voivodeship: Łódź
- County: Sieradz
- Gmina: Goszczanów

Stojanów [stɔˈjanuf] is a village in the administrative district of Gmina Goszczanów, within Sieradz County, Łódź Voivodeship, in central Poland.
