= Goszczanów =

- Village
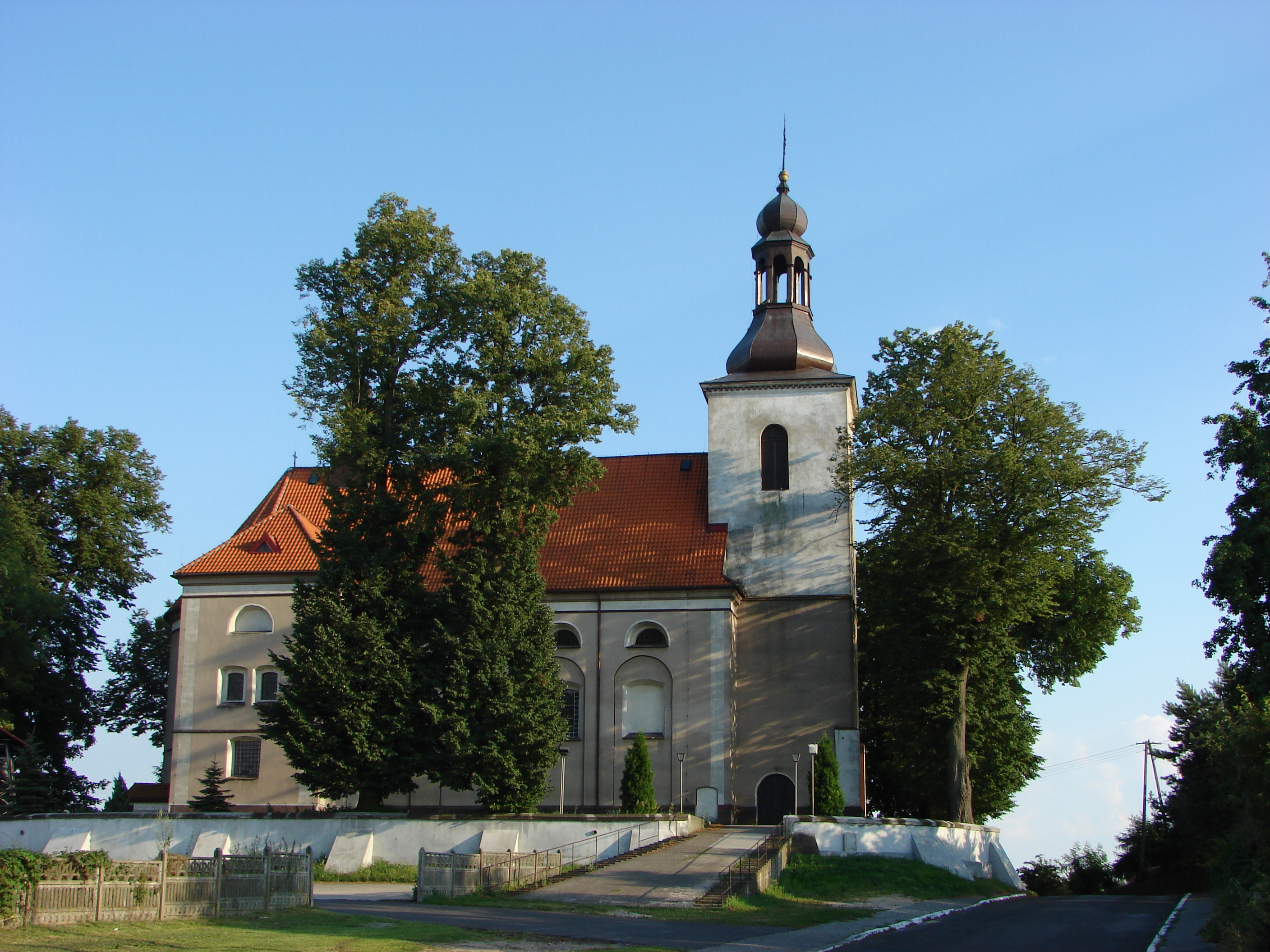
- Church of Saints Martin & Stanislaus

- Location within Poland
- Coordinates: 51°47′21″N 18°30′17″E
- Country: Poland
- Voivodeship: Łódź
- County: Sieradz
- Gmina: Goszczanów
- Population: 824

Goszczanów [ɡɔʂˈt͡ʂanuf] is a village in Sieradz County, Łódź Voivodeship, in central Poland. It is the seat of the gmina (administrative district) called Gmina Goszczanów.

There is a parish church of Saints Martin & Stanislaus. Founded by Adam Poniatowski herbu (Coat of Arms) Szreniawa and built in 1666, in Baroque style.
