= Buszewko, Greater Poland Voivodeship =

Buszewko
- Village
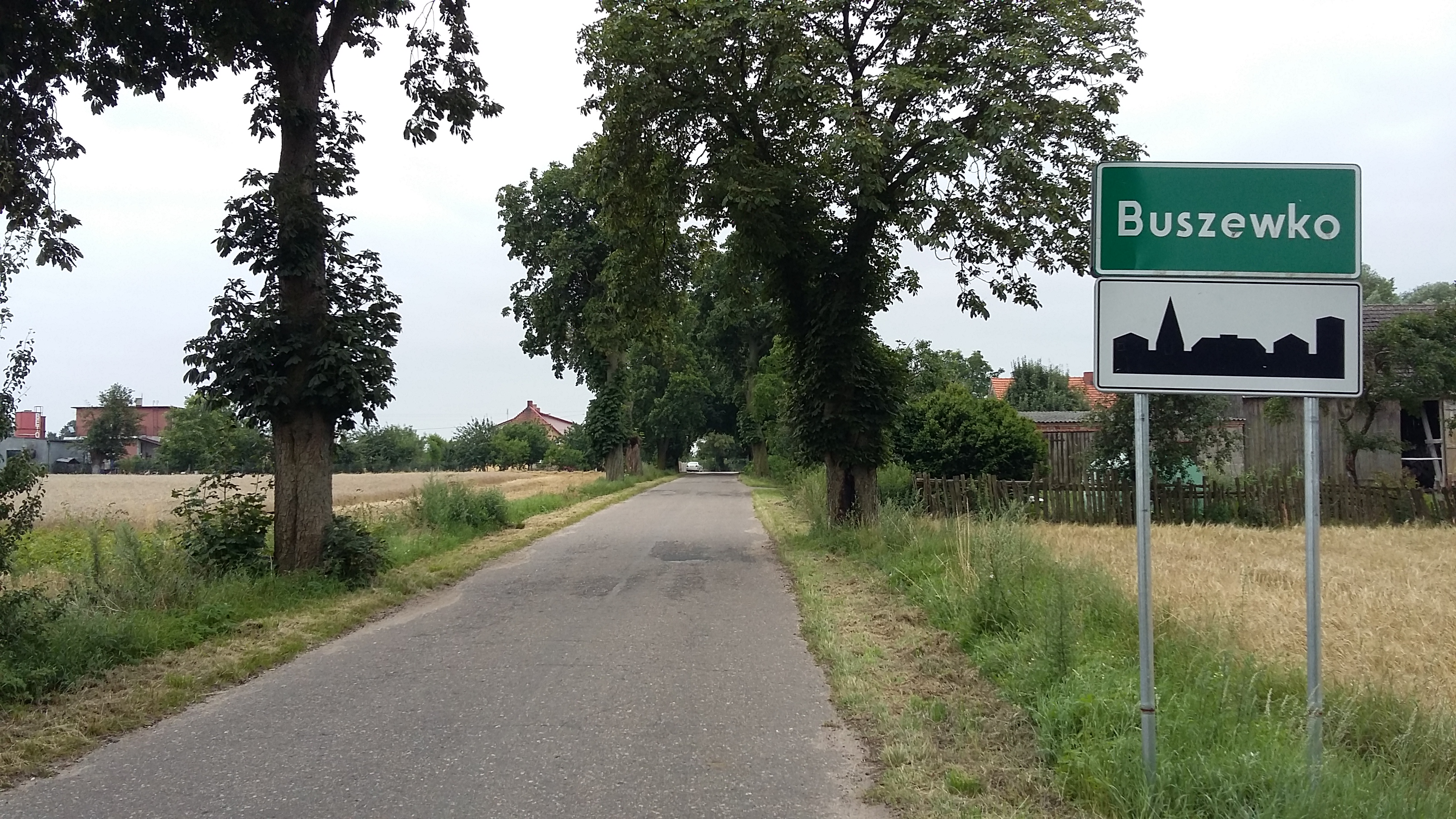
- Road sign to Buszewko

- Coat of arms

- Location within Poland
- Coordinates: 52°32′35″N 16°23′6″E
- Country: Poland
- Voivodeship: Greater Poland
- County: Szamotuły
- Gmina: Pniewy

Buszewko ([buˈʂɛfkɔ]; German: Gut Buschewo) is a village in the administrative district of Gmina Pniewy, within Szamotuły County, Greater Poland Voivodeship, in west-central Poland.
