= Bobulczyn =

- Village
- Location within Poland
- Coordinates: 52°40′N 16°24′E
- Country: Poland
- Voivodeship: Greater Poland
- County: Szamotuły
- Gmina: Ostroróg

Bobulczyn [bɔˈbult͡ʂɨn] is a village in the administrative district of Gmina Ostroróg, within Szamotuły County, Greater Poland Voivodeship, in west-central Poland.
