= Konin, Szamotuły County =

Konin
- Village
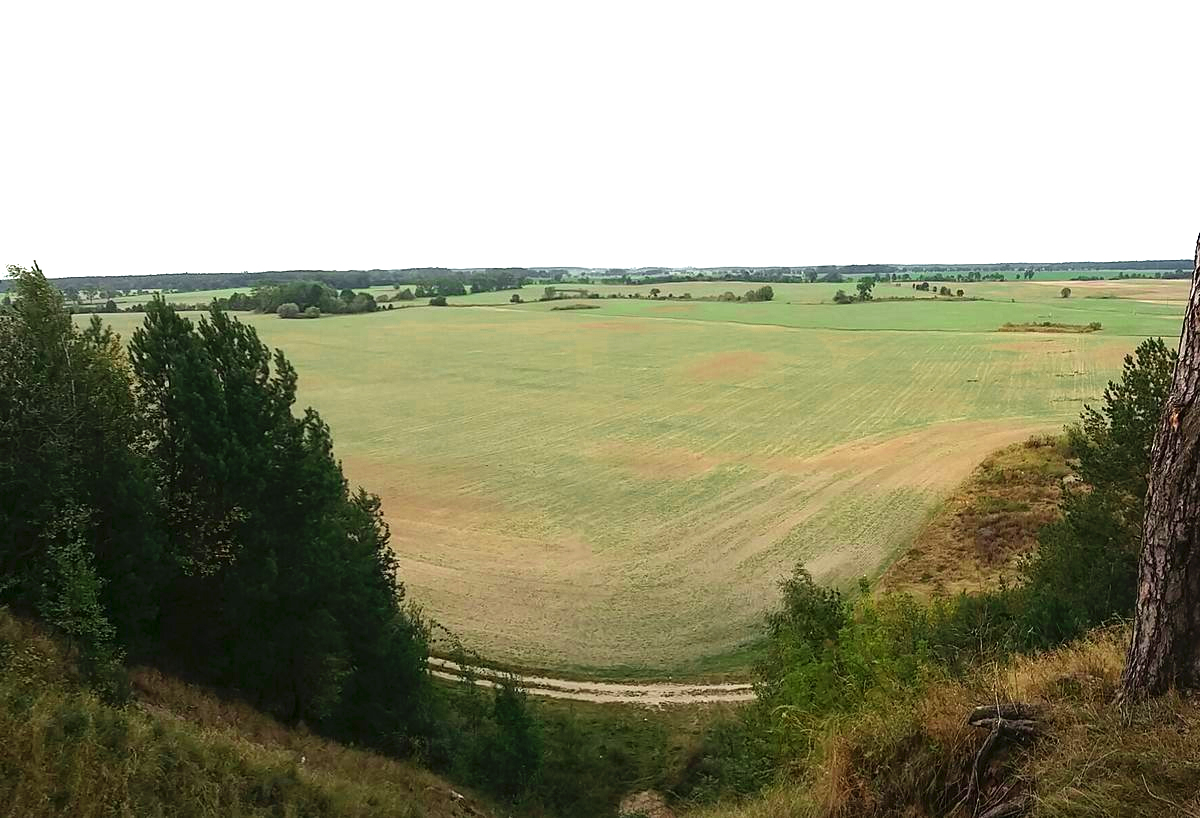
- View of Konin from the hill in Chełmno

- Location within Poland
- Coordinates: 52°31′30″N 16°19′02″E
- Country: Poland
- Voivodeship: Greater Poland
- County: Szamotuły
- Gmina: Pniewy

Konin [ˈkɔnin] is a village in the administrative district of Gmina Pniewy, within Szamotuły County, Greater Poland Voivodeship, in west-central Poland.
