= Karczemka, Greater Poland Voivodeship =

Karczemka
- Settlement
- Location within Poland
- Coordinates: 52°41′45″N 16°32′19″E
- Country: Poland
- Voivodeship: Greater Poland
- County: Szamotuły
- Gmina: Obrzycko

Karczemka [karˈt͡ʂɛmka] is a settlement in the administrative district of Gmina Obrzycko, within Szamotuły County, Greater Poland Voivodeship, in west-central Poland.
