= Tomaszewo, Szamotuły County =

Tomaszewo
- Settlement
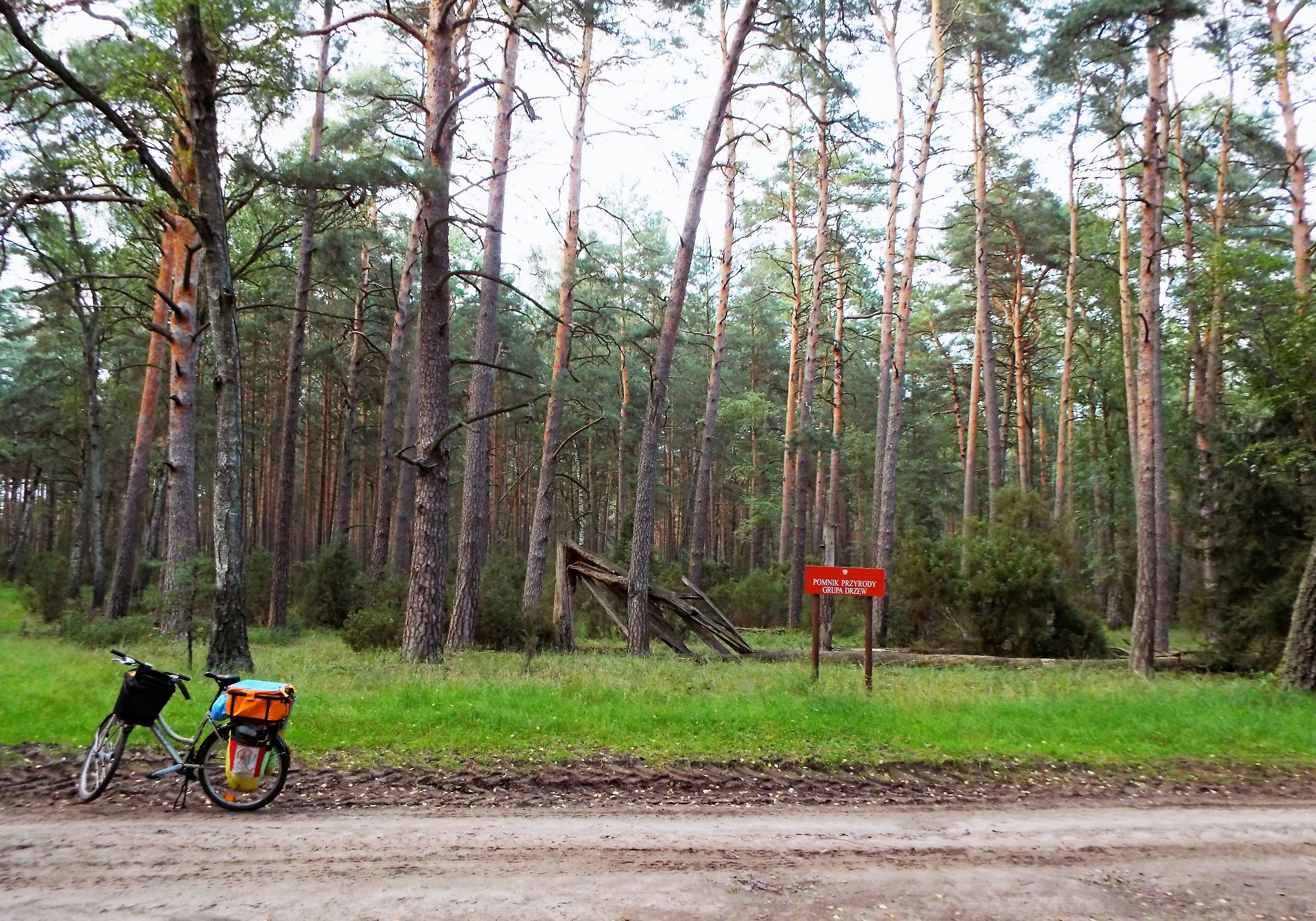

- Location within Poland
- Coordinates: 52°44′39″N 16°13′33″E
- Country: Poland
- Voivodeship: Greater Poland
- County: Szamotuły
- Gmina: Wronki
- Population: 4

Tomaszewo [tɔmaˈʂɛvɔ] is a settlement in the administrative district of Gmina Wronki, within Szamotuły County, Greater Poland Voivodeship, in west-central Poland.
