= Kluczewo-Huby =

- Village
- Location within Poland
- Coordinates: 52°38′7″N 16°29′27″E
- Country: Poland
- Voivodeship: Greater Poland
- County: Szamotuły
- Gmina: Ostroróg
- Population: 80

Kluczewo-Huby [kluˈt͡ʂɛvɔ ˈxubɨ] is a village in the administrative district of Gmina Ostroróg, within Szamotuły County, Greater Poland Voivodeship, in west-central Poland.
