= Gaj Wielki =

- Village
- Location within Poland
- Coordinates: 52°28′N 16°35′E
- Country: Poland
- Voivodeship: Greater Poland
- County: Szamotuły
- Gmina: Kaźmierz
- Population: 606

Gaj Wielki (Polish pronunciation: [ɡaj ˈvjɛlkʲi]) is a village in the administrative district of Gmina Kaźmierz, within Szamotuły County, Greater Poland Voivodeship, in west-central Poland.
