= Olin, Poland =

Olin
- Village
- Location within Poland
- Coordinates: 52°41′10″N 16°17′30″E
- Country: Poland
- Voivodeship: Greater Poland
- County: Szamotuły
- Gmina: Wronki
- Population: 11

Olin [ˈɔlin] is a village in the administrative district of Gmina Wronki, within Szamotuły County, Greater Poland Voivodeship, in west-central Poland.
