= Lubowo =

Lubowo may refer to the following places:

- Lubowo, Greater Poland Voivodeship (west-central Poland)
- Łubowo, Greater Poland Voivodeship
- Lubowo, Koszalin County in West Pomeranian Voivodeship (north-west Poland)
- Lubowo, Stargard County in West Pomeranian Voivodeship
- Lubowo, Wałcz County in West Pomeranian Voivodeship
- Łubowo, West Pomeranian Voivodeship
