= Buszewo, Szamotuły County =

Buszewo
- Village
- Location within Poland
- Coordinates: 52°33′N 16°22′E
- Country: Poland
- Voivodeship: Greater Poland
- County: Szamotuły
- Gmina: Pniewy

Buszewo ([buˈʂɛvɔ]; German: Buschewo) is a village in the administrative district of Gmina Pniewy, within Szamotuły County, Greater Poland Voivodeship, in west-central Poland.
