= Samita =

- Settlement
- Location within Poland
- Coordinates: 52°41′52″N 16°07′19″E
- Country: Poland
- Voivodeship: Greater Poland
- County: Szamotuły
- Gmina: Wronki
- Population: 8

Samita [saˈmita] is a settlement in the administrative district of Gmina Wronki, within Szamotuły County, Greater Poland Voivodeship, in west-central Poland.
