= Huby-Oporowo =

- Village
- Location within Poland
- Coordinates: 52°40′34″N 16°24′26″E
- Country: Poland
- Voivodeship: Greater Poland
- County: Szamotuły
- Gmina: Wronki
- Population: 60

Huby-Oporowo [ˈxubɨ ɔpɔˈrɔvɔ] is a village in the administrative district of Gmina Wronki, within Szamotuły County, Greater Poland Voivodeship, in west-central Poland.
