= Kiączyn =

- Village
- Location within Poland
- Coordinates: 52°29′49″N 16°35′10″E
- Country: Poland
- Voivodeship: Greater Poland
- County: Szamotuły
- Gmina: Kaźmierz

Kiączyn [ˈkʲɔnt͡ʂɨn] is a village in the administrative district of Gmina Kaźmierz, within Szamotuły County, Greater Poland Voivodeship, in west-central Poland.
