= Wróblewo, Szamotuły County =

Wróblewo
- Village
- Location within Poland
- Coordinates: 52°40′4″N 16°18′32″E
- Country: Poland
- Voivodeship: Greater Poland
- County: Szamotuły
- Gmina: Wronki
- Population: 395

Wróblewo [vruˈblɛvɔ] is a village in the administrative district of Gmina Wronki, within Szamotuły County, Greater Poland Voivodeship, in west-central Poland.
