= Gorszewice =

- Village
- Location within Poland
- Coordinates: 52°31′9″N 16°31′43″E
- Country: Poland
- Voivodeship: Greater Poland
- County: Szamotuły
- Gmina: Kaźmierz

Gorszewice [ɡɔrʂɛˈvit͡sɛ] is a village in the administrative district of Gmina Kaźmierz, within Szamotuły County, Greater Poland Voivodeship, in west-central Poland.
