= Antoniny, Szamotuły County =

Antoniny
- Village
- Location within Poland
- Coordinates: 52°42′41″N 16°28′13″E
- Country: Poland
- Voivodeship: Greater Poland
- County: Szamotuły
- Gmina: Obrzycko

Antoniny [antɔˈninɨ] is a village in the administrative district of Gmina Obrzycko, within Szamotuły County, Greater Poland Voivodeship, in west-central Poland.
