= Modrak, Greater Poland Voivodeship =

Modrak
- Village
- Location within Poland
- Coordinates: 52°42′52″N 16°29′37″E
- Country: Poland
- Voivodeship: Greater Poland
- County: Szamotuły
- Gmina: Obrzycko

Modrak [ˈmɔdrak] is a village in the administrative district of Gmina Obrzycko, within Szamotuły County, Greater Poland Voivodeship, in west-central Poland.
