= Chełmno, Szamotuły County =

Chełmno
- Village
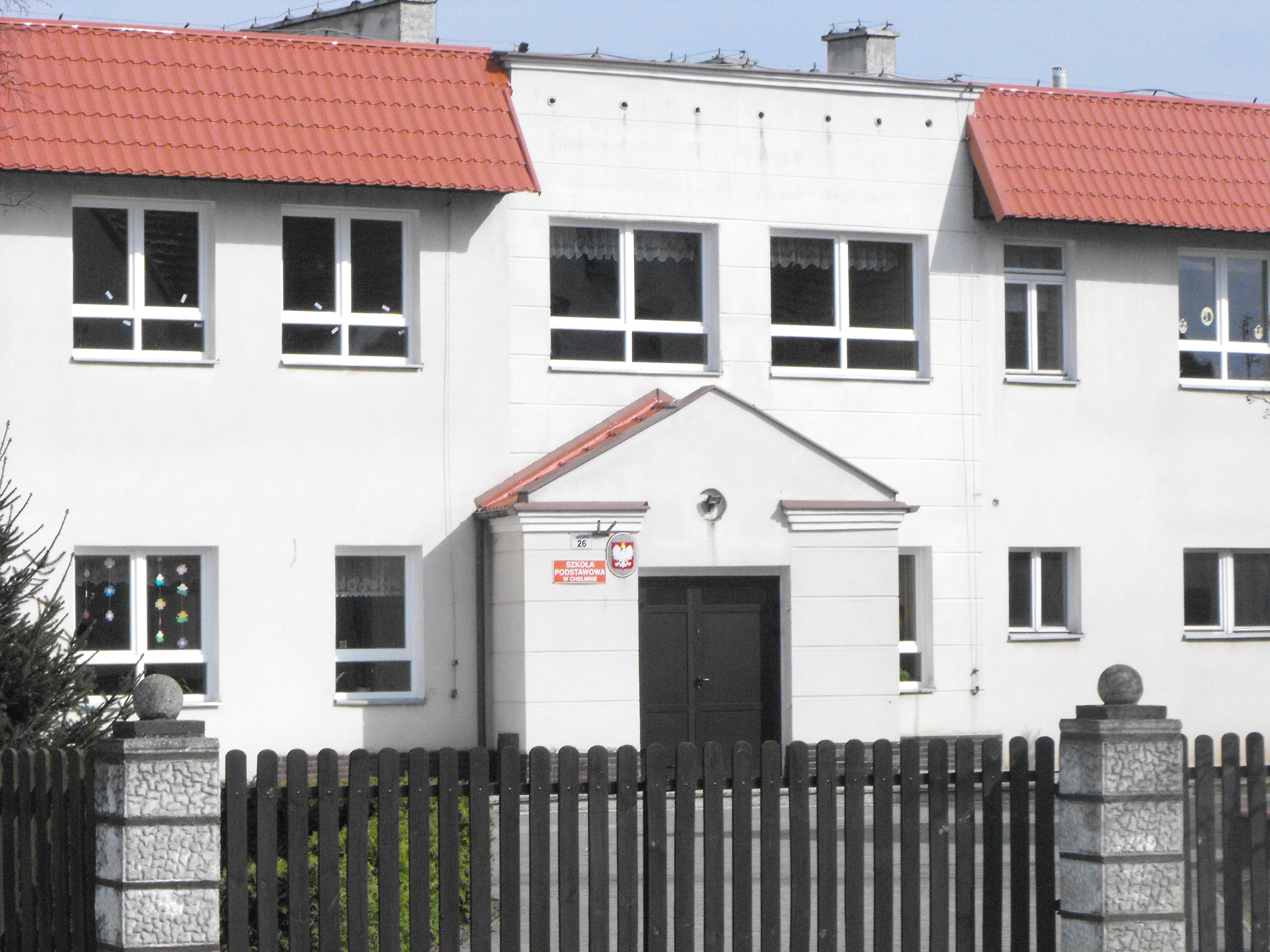
- Primary school in Chełmno

- Location within Poland
- Coordinates: 52°29′50″N 16°19′17″E
- Country: Poland
- Voivodeship: Greater Poland
- County: Szamotuły
- Gmina: Pniewy
- Population: 423
- Time zone: UTC+1 (CET)
  - Summer (DST): UTC+2 (CEST)
- Vehicle registration: PSZ

Chełmno [ˈxɛu̯mnɔ] is a village in the administrative district of Gmina Pniewy, within Szamotuły County, Greater Poland Voivodeship, in west-central Poland.

== History ==
The oldest known mention of the village comes from 1257. Chełmno was a private village of Polish nobility, administratively located in the Poznań County in the Poznań Voivodeship in the Greater Poland Province of the Polish Crown.

During the German occupation of Poland (World War II), in 1940, the occupiers carried out expulsions of Poles, who were sent to a transit camp in Łódź, and then deported to the General Government in the more eastern part of German-occupied Poland, while their houses and farms were handed over to German colonists as part of the Lebensraum policy.

== Notable people ==
- Teofila Radońska (1846–ca. 1913), Polish publicist, poet, and translator
