= Szczepankowo =

Szczepankowo may refer to:

- Szczepankowo, part of the district of Nowe Miasto (Poznań)
- Szczepankowo, Greater Poland Voivodeship (west-central Poland)
- Szczepankowo, Kuyavian-Pomeranian Voivodeship (north-central Poland)
- Szczepankowo, Podlaskie Voivodeship (north-east Poland)
- Szczepankowo, Iława County in Warmian-Masurian Voivodeship (north Poland)
- Szczepankowo, Ostróda County in Warmian-Masurian Voivodeship (north Poland)
- Szczepankowo, Szczytno County in Warmian-Masurian Voivodeship (north Poland)
