= Turowo, Greater Poland Voivodeship =

Turowo
- Village
- Location within Poland
- Coordinates: 52°28′N 16°19′E
- Country: Poland
- Voivodeship: Greater Poland
- County: Szamotuły
- Gmina: Pniewy

Turowo [tuˈrɔvɔ] is a village in the administrative district of Gmina Pniewy, within Szamotuły County, Greater Poland Voivodeship, in west-central Poland.
