= Pustelnia =

Pustelnia may refer to the following places:

- Pustelnia, Greater Poland Voivodeship (west-central Poland)
- Pustelnia, Kuyavian-Pomeranian Voivodeship (north-central Poland)
- Pustelnia, West Pomeranian Voivodeship (north-west Poland)
