= Aleksandrowo, Szamotuły County =

Aleksandrowo
- Village
- Location within Poland
- Coordinates: 52°43′N 16°18′E
- Country: Poland
- Voivodeship: Greater Poland
- County: Szamotuły
- Gmina: Wronki
- Population: 51

Aleksandrowo [alɛksanˈdrɔvɔ] is a village in the administrative district of Gmina Wronki, within Szamotuły County, Greater Poland Voivodeship, in west-central Poland.
