= Karolin, Greater Poland Voivodeship =

Karolin
- Village
- Location within Poland
- Coordinates: 52°39′28″N 16°31′6″E
- Country: Poland
- Voivodeship: Greater Poland
- County: Szamotuły
- Gmina: Obrzycko
- Population: 20

Karolin [kaˈrɔlin] is a village in the administrative district of Gmina Obrzycko, within Szamotuły County, Greater Poland Voivodeship, in west-central Poland.
