= Winnogóra =

- Village
- Location within Poland
- Coordinates: 52°43′55″N 16°16′55″E
- Country: Poland
- Voivodeship: Greater Poland
- County: Szamotuły
- Gmina: Wronki

Winnogóra [vinnɔˈɡura] is a village in the administrative district of Gmina Wronki, within Szamotuły County, Greater Poland Voivodeship, in west-central Poland.
