= Szostaki, Greater Poland Voivodeship =

Szostaki
- Village
- Location within Poland
- Coordinates: 52°43′40″N 16°2′32″E
- Country: Poland
- Voivodeship: Greater Poland
- County: Szamotuły
- Gmina: Wronki
- Population: 10

Szostaki [ʂɔsˈtaki] is a village in the administrative district of Gmina Wronki, within Szamotuły County, Greater Poland Voivodeship, in west-central Poland.
