= Koninek, Szamotuły County =

Koninek
- Village
- Location within Poland
- Coordinates: 52°33′N 16°19′E
- Country: Poland
- Voivodeship: Greater Poland
- County: Szamotuły
- Gmina: Pniewy

Koninek ([kɔˈninɛk]; German: Koninko) is a village in the administrative district of Gmina Pniewy, within Szamotuły County, Greater Poland Voivodeship, in west-central Poland.
