= Obrzycko-Zamek =

- Village
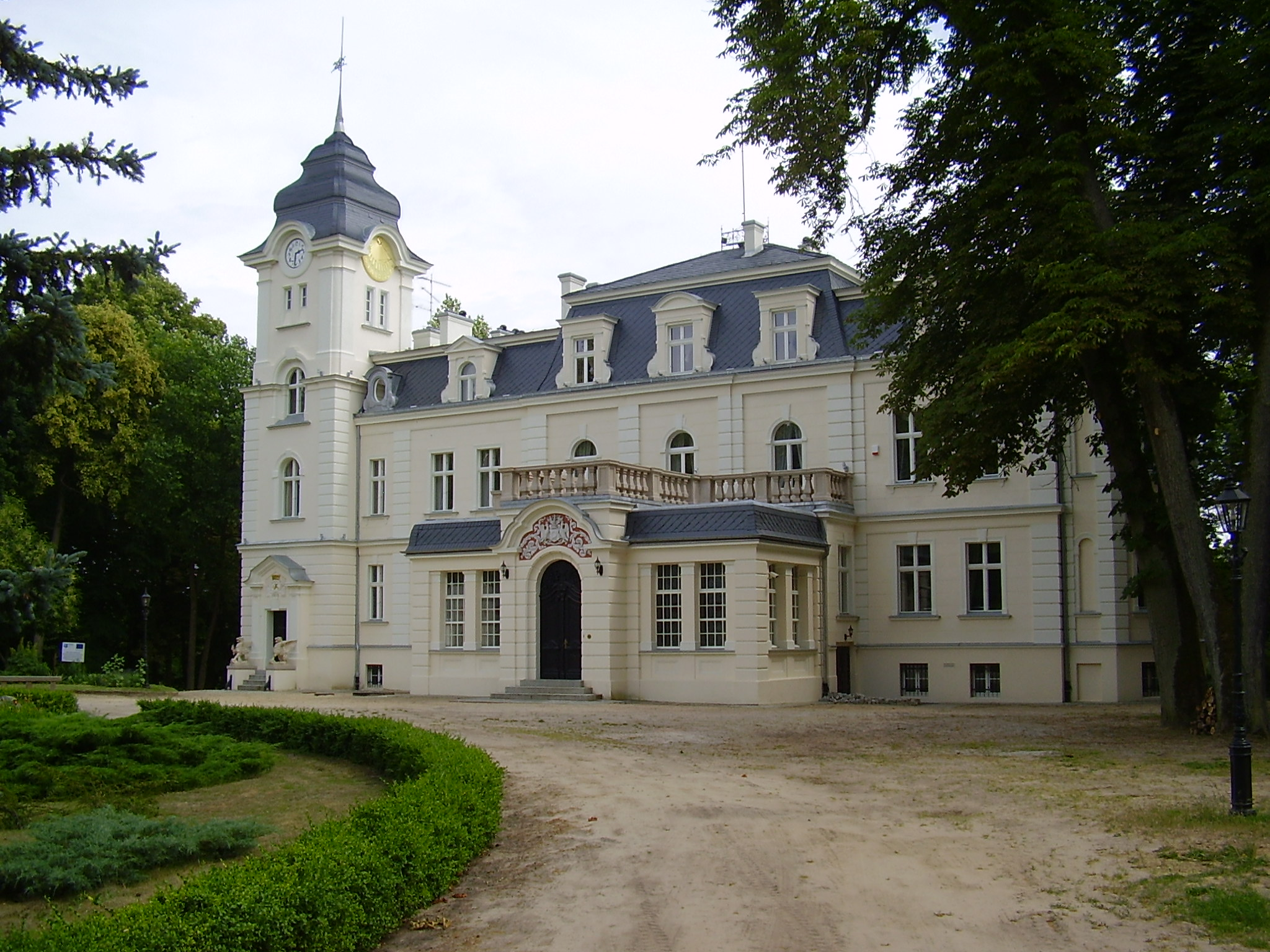

- Location within Poland
- Coordinates: 52°42′38″N 16°30′35″E
- Country: Poland
- Voivodeship: Greater Poland
- County: Szamotuły
- Gmina: Obrzycko

Obrzycko-Zamek [ɔˈbʐɨt͡skɔ ˈzamɛk] is a village in the administrative district of Gmina Obrzycko, within Szamotuły County, Greater Poland Voivodeship, in west-central Poland.
