= Sękowo, Szamotuły County =

Sękowo
- Village
- Location within Poland
- Coordinates: 52°30′N 16°26′E
- Country: Poland
- Voivodeship: Greater Poland
- County: Szamotuły
- Gmina: Duszniki
- Population (approx.): 570
- Website: www.sekowo.pl

Sękowo [sɛnˈkɔvɔ] is a village in the administrative district of Gmina Duszniki, within Szamotuły County, Greater Poland Voivodeship, in west-central Poland.

The village has an approximate population of 570.
