= Konin-Huby =

- Settlement
- Location within Poland
- Coordinates: 52°32′27″N 16°19′17″E
- Country: Poland
- Voivodeship: Greater Poland
- County: Szamotuły
- Gmina: Pniewy

Konin-Huby [ˈkɔnin ˈxubɨ] is a settlement in the administrative district of Gmina Pniewy, within Szamotuły County, Greater Poland Voivodeship, in west-central Poland.
