= Chojno-Młyn =

- Village
- Location within Poland
- Coordinates: 52°41′16″N 16°10′8″E
- Country: Poland
- Voivodeship: Greater Poland
- County: Szamotuły
- Gmina: Wronki
- Population: 206

Chojno-Młyn (Polish pronunciation: [ˈxɔjnɔ ˈmwɨn]) is a village in the administrative district of Gmina Wronki, within Szamotuły County, Greater Poland Voivodeship, in west-central Poland.
