= Podrzewie =

- Village
- Location within Poland
- Coordinates: 52°29′N 16°23′E
- Country: Poland
- Voivodeship: Greater Poland
- County: Szamotuły
- Gmina: Duszniki

Podrzewie [pɔˈdʐɛvjɛ] is a village in the administrative district of Gmina Duszniki, within Szamotuły County, Greater Poland Voivodeship, in west-central Poland.
