= Witkowice, Szamotuły County =

Witkowice
- Village
- Location within Poland
- Coordinates: 52°29′58″N 16°31′50″E
- Country: Poland
- Voivodeship: Greater Poland
- County: Szamotuły
- Gmina: Kaźmierz

Witkowice [vitkɔˈvit͡sɛ] is a village in the administrative district of Gmina Kaźmierz, within Szamotuły County, Greater Poland Voivodeship, in west-central Poland.
