= Ceradz Dolny =

- Village
- Location within Poland
- Coordinates: 52°25′N 16°34′E
- Country: Poland
- Voivodeship: Greater Poland
- County: Szamotuły
- Gmina: Duszniki

Ceradz Dolny [ˈt͡sɛrat͡s ˈdɔlnɨ] is a village in the administrative district of Gmina Duszniki, within Szamotuły County, Greater Poland Voivodeship, in west-central Poland.
