= Zakrzewko, Szamotuły County =

Zakrzewko
- Village
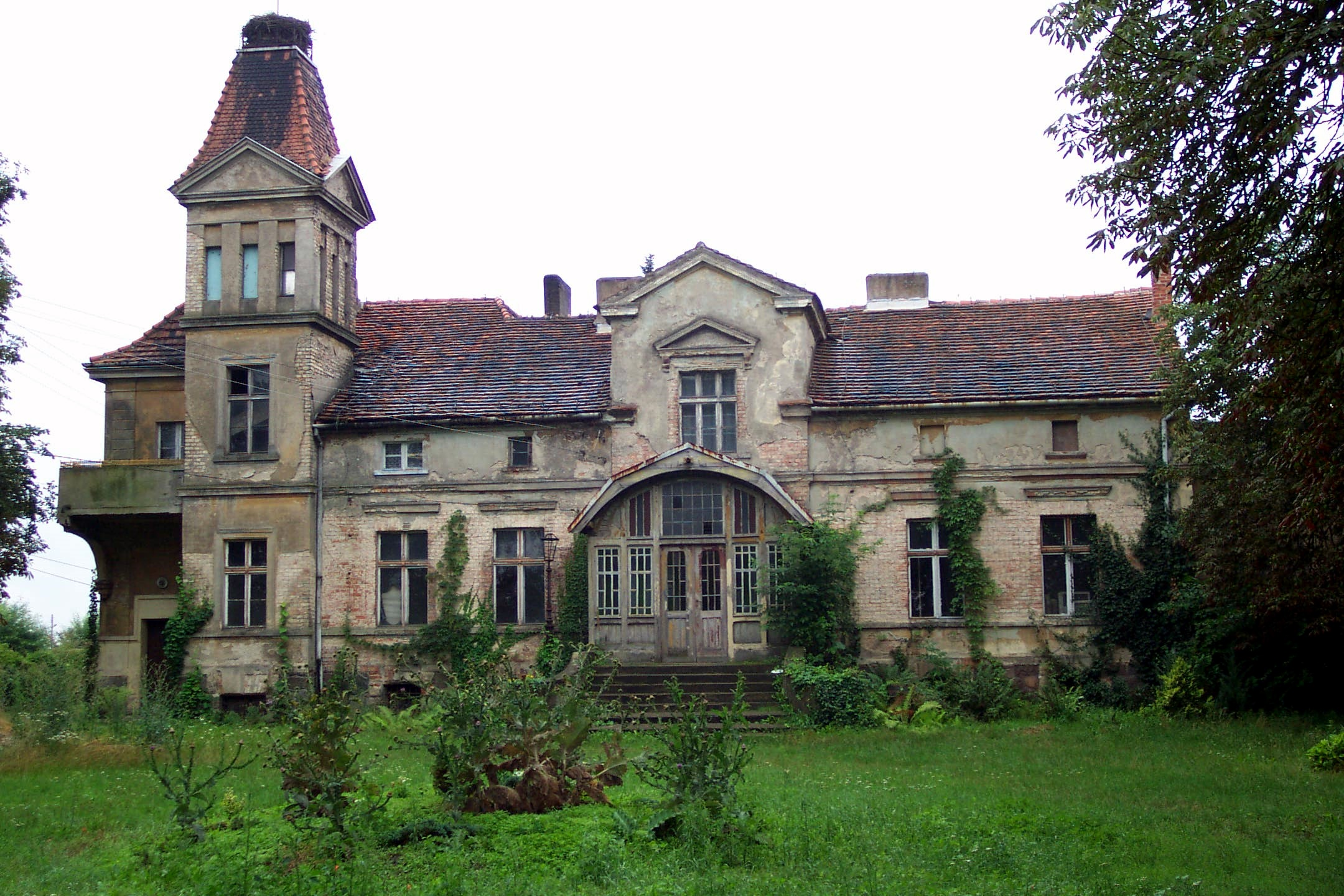

- Location within Poland
- Coordinates: 52°24′58″N 16°24′36″E
- Country: Poland
- Voivodeship: Greater Poland
- County: Szamotuły
- Gmina: Duszniki

Zakrzewko [zaˈkʂɛfkɔ] is a village in the administrative district of Gmina Duszniki, within Szamotuły County, Greater Poland Voivodeship, in west-central Poland.
