= Jakubowo, Szamotuły County =

Jakubowo
- Village
- Location within Poland
- Coordinates: 52°29′47″N 16°17′33″E
- Country: Poland
- Voivodeship: Greater Poland
- County: Szamotuły
- Gmina: Pniewy

Jakubowo [jakuˈbɔvɔ] is a village in the administrative district of Gmina Pniewy, within Szamotuły County, Greater Poland Voivodeship, in west-central Poland.
