= Chojno-Błota Małe =

- Village
- Location within Poland
- Coordinates: 52°42′50″N 16°12′30″E
- Country: Poland
- Voivodeship: Greater Poland
- County: Szamotuły
- Gmina: Wronki
- Population: 82

Chojno-Błota Małe (Polish pronunciation: [ˈxɔjnɔ ˈbwɔta ˈmawɛ]) is a village in the administrative district of Gmina Wronki, within Szamotuły County, Greater Poland Voivodeship, in west-central Poland.
