= Brzoza, Szamotuły County =

Brzoza
- Village
- Location within Poland
- Coordinates: 52°24′N 16°34′E
- Country: Poland
- Voivodeship: Greater Poland
- County: Szamotuły
- Gmina: Duszniki

Brzoza [ˈbʐɔza] is a village in the administrative district of Gmina Duszniki, in Szamotuły County, Greater Poland Voivodeship, in west-central Poland.
