= Borownik =

- Village
- Location within Poland
- Coordinates: 52°42′41.13″N 16°33′00″E
- Country: Poland
- Voivodeship: Greater Poland
- County: Szamotuły
- Gmina: Obrzycko

Borownik [bɔˈrɔvnik] is a village in the administrative district of Gmina Obrzycko, within Szamotuły County, Greater Poland Voivodeship, in west-central Poland.
