= Jasionna, Greater Poland Voivodeship =

Jasionna
- Village
- Location within Poland
- Coordinates: 52°45′15″N 16°24′17″E
- Country: Poland
- Voivodeship: Greater Poland
- County: Szamotuły
- Gmina: Wronki
- Population: 255

Jasionna [jaˈɕɔnna] is a village in the administrative district of Gmina Wronki, within Szamotuły County, Greater Poland Voivodeship, in west-central Poland.
