= Piersko =

- Village
- Location within Poland
- Coordinates: 52°31′N 16°29′E
- Country: Poland
- Voivodeship: Greater Poland
- County: Szamotuły
- Gmina: Kaźmierz

Piersko [ˈpjɛrskɔ] is a village in the administrative district of Gmina Kaźmierz, within Szamotuły County, Greater Poland Voivodeship, in west-central Poland.
