= Samołęż =

- Village
- Location within Poland
- Coordinates: 52°41′35″N 16°25′13″E
- Country: Poland
- Voivodeship: Greater Poland
- County: Szamotuły
- Gmina: Wronki
- Population: 355

Samołęż ([saˈmɔwɛ̃ʂ]; German: Samolentsch) is a village in the administrative district of Gmina Wronki, within Szamotuły County, Greater Poland Voivodeship, in west-central Poland.
