= Smolnica, Szamotuły County =

Smolnica
- Village
- Location within Poland
- Coordinates: 52°44′N 16°26′E
- Country: Poland
- Voivodeship: Greater Poland
- County: Szamotuły
- Gmina: Wronki
- Population: 71

Smolnica [smɔlˈnit͡sa] is a village in the administrative district of Gmina Wronki, within Szamotuły County, Greater Poland Voivodeship, in west-central Poland.
