= Berdychowo, Szamotuły County =

Berdychowo
- Settlement
- Location within Poland
- Coordinates: 52°29′23.26″N 16°14′10.21″E
- Country: Poland
- Voivodeship: Greater Poland
- County: Szamotuły
- Gmina: Pniewy

Berdychowo [bɛrdɨˈxɔvɔ] is a settlement in the administrative district of Gmina Pniewy, within Szamotuły County, Greater Poland Voivodeship, in west-central Poland.
