= Głuchowo, Szamotuły County =

Głuchowo
- Village
- Location within Poland
- Coordinates: 52°38′55″N 16°20′14″E
- Country: Poland
- Voivodeship: Greater Poland
- County: Szamotuły
- Gmina: Wronki
- Population: 99

Głuchowo [ɡwuˈxɔvɔ] is a village in the administrative district of Gmina Wronki, within Szamotuły County, Greater Poland Voivodeship, in west-central Poland.
