= Kopanina, Szamotuły County =

Kopanina
- Village
- Location within Poland
- Coordinates: 52°32′10″N 16°32′31″E
- Country: Poland
- Voivodeship: Greater Poland
- County: Szamotuły
- Gmina: Kaźmierz

Kopanina [kɔpaˈnina] is a village in the administrative district of Gmina Kaźmierz, within Szamotuły County, Greater Poland Voivodeship, in west-central Poland.
