= Stróżki =

- Village
- Location within Poland
- Coordinates: 52°42′1″N 16°24′16″E
- Country: Poland
- Voivodeship: Greater Poland
- County: Szamotuły
- Gmina: Wronki
- Population: 389

Stróżki [ˈstruʂki] is a village in the administrative district of Gmina Wronki, within Szamotuły County, Greater Poland Voivodeship, in west-central Poland.
