= Stare Miasto, Szamotuły County =

Stare Miasto
- Village
- Location within Poland
- Coordinates: 52°41′42″N 16°20′57″E
- Country: Poland
- Voivodeship: Greater Poland
- County: Szamotuły
- Gmina: Wronki
- Population: 221

Stare Miasto (Polish pronunciation: [ˈstarɛ ˈmjastɔ]) is a village in the administrative district of Gmina Wronki, within Szamotuły County, Greater Poland Voivodeship, in west-central Poland.
