= Podborowo, Szamotuły County =

Podborowo
- Village
- Location within Poland
- Coordinates: 52°35′50″N 16°20′32″E
- Country: Poland
- Voivodeship: Greater Poland
- County: Szamotuły
- Gmina: Pniewy

Podborowo [pɔdbɔˈrɔvɔ] is a village in the administrative district of Gmina Pniewy, within Szamotuły County, Greater Poland Voivodeship, in west-central Poland.
