= Lizbona, Poland =

Lizbona
- Settlement
- Location within Poland
- Coordinates: 52°40′31″N 16°29′5″E
- Country: Poland
- Voivodeship: Greater Poland
- County: Szamotuły
- Gmina: Obrzycko
- Population: 20

Lizbona [lizˈbɔna] is a settlement in the administrative district of Gmina Obrzycko, within Szamotuły County, Greater Poland Voivodeship, in west-central Poland.
