= Chojno-Leśniczówka =

- Settlement
- Country: Poland
- Voivodeship: Greater Poland
- County: Szamotuły
- Gmina: Wronki
- Population: 13

Chojno-Leśniczówka (Polish pronunciation: [ˈxɔjnɔ lɛɕɲiˈtʂufka]) is a settlement in the administrative district of Gmina Wronki, within Szamotuły County, Greater Poland Voivodeship, in west-central Poland.
