= Dębogóra, Szamotuły County =

Dębogóra
- Settlement
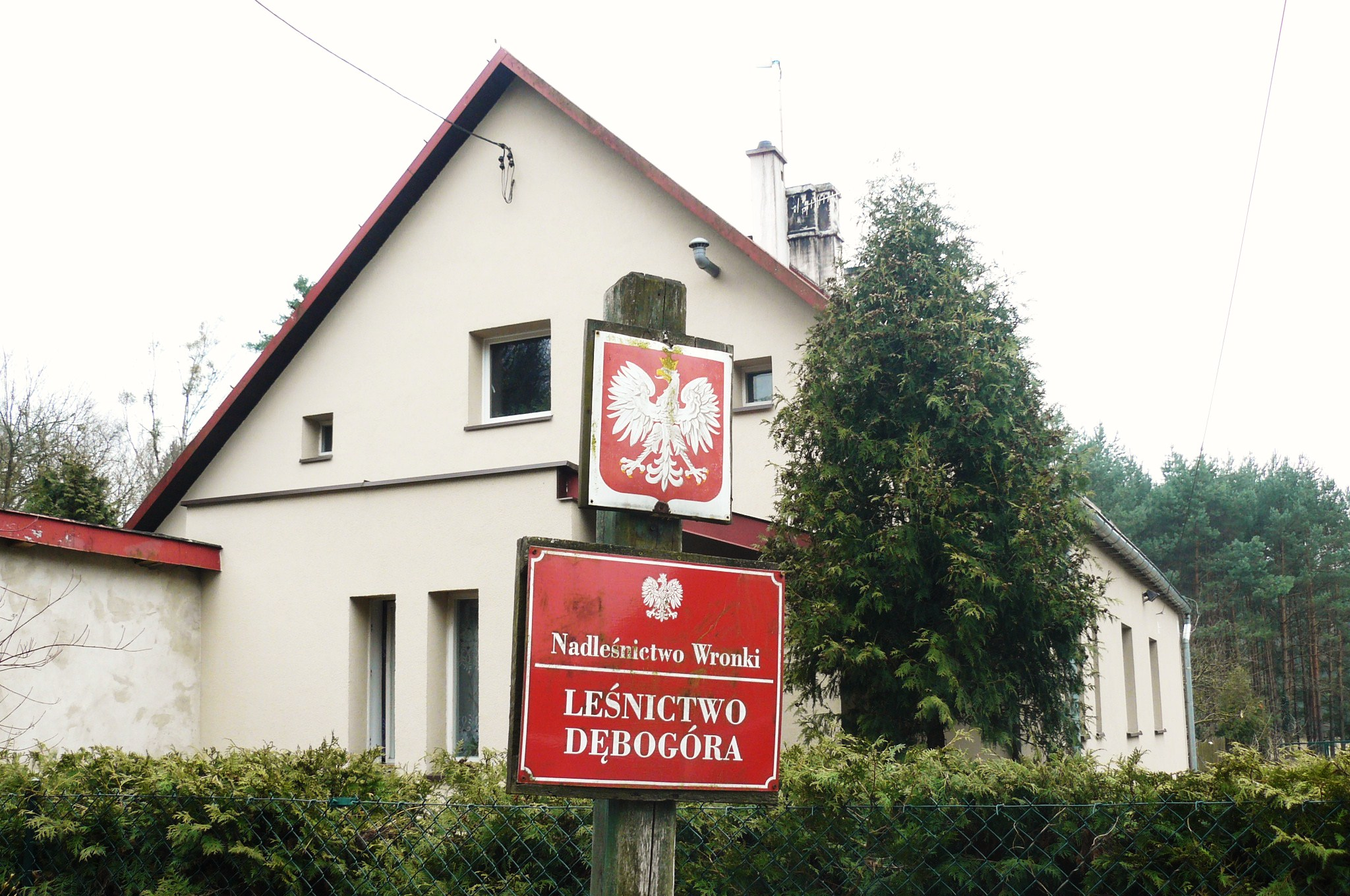
- A forester's lodge in Dębogóra in the Noteć Forest

- Location within Poland
- Coordinates: 52°47′00″N 16°09′17″E
- Country: Poland
- Voivodeship: Greater Poland
- County: Szamotuły
- Gmina: Wronki
- Population: 5

Dębogóra [dɛmbɔˈɡura] is a settlement in the administrative district of Gmina Wronki, within Szamotuły County, Greater Poland Voivodeship, in west-central Poland.
