= Nowa Wieś, Gmina Wronki =

Nowa Wieś
- Village
- Location within Poland
- Coordinates: 52°41′33″N 16°23′39″E
- Country: Poland
- Voivodeship: Greater Poland
- County: Szamotuły
- Gmina: Wronki
- Population: 1,251

Nowa Wieś ([ˈnɔva ˈvjɛɕ]; German: Neudorf) is a village in the administrative district of Gmina Wronki, within Szamotuły County, Greater Poland Voivodeship, in west-central Poland.
