= Ćmachowo =

- Village
- Location within Poland
- Coordinates: 52°40′53″N 16°19′4″E
- Country: Poland
- Voivodeship: Greater Poland
- County: Szamotuły
- Gmina: Wronki
- Population: 533

Ćmachowo [t͡ɕmaˈxɔvɔ] is a village in the administrative district of Gmina Wronki, within Szamotuły County, Greater Poland Voivodeship, in west-central Poland.
