= Sędzinko =

- Village
- Location within Poland
- Coordinates: 52°24′00.8″N 16°27′37.5″E
- Country: Poland
- Voivodeship: Greater Poland
- County: Szamotuły
- Gmina: Duszniki

Sędzinko [sɛnˈd͡ʑinkɔ] (German Klein Lintze) is a village in the administrative district of Gmina Duszniki, within Szamotuły County, Greater Poland Voivodeship, in west-central Poland.
