= Młynkowo, Szamotuły County =

Młynkowo
- Village
- Location within Poland
- Coordinates: 52°28′N 16°27′E
- Country: Poland
- Voivodeship: Greater Poland
- County: Szamotuły
- Gmina: Duszniki

Młynkowo [mwɨnˈkɔvɔ] is a village in the administrative district of Gmina Duszniki, within Szamotuły County, Greater Poland Voivodeship, in west-central Poland.
