= Zajączkowo, Greater Poland Voivodeship =

Zajączkowo
- Village
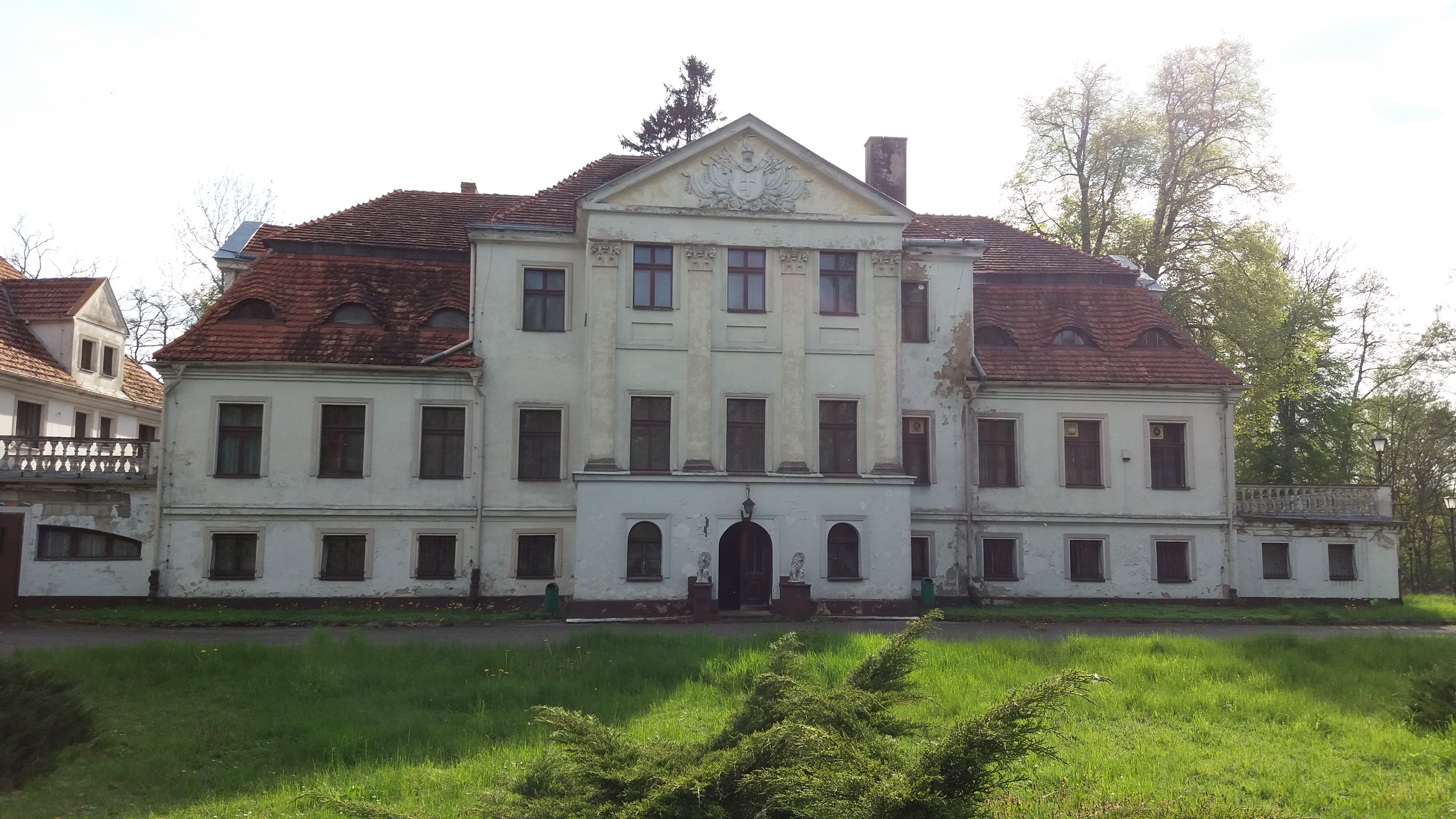
- Palace in Zajączkowo

- Location within Poland
- Coordinates: 52°34′N 16°21′E
- Country: Poland
- Voivodeship: Greater Poland
- County: Szamotuły
- Gmina: Pniewy

Zajączkowo [zajɔnt͡ʂˈkɔvɔ] is a village in the administrative district of Gmina Pniewy, within Szamotuły County, Greater Poland Voivodeship, in west-central Poland.
