= Koszanowo, Szamotuły County =

Koszanowo
- Village
- Location within Poland
- Coordinates: 52°31′N 16°21′E
- Country: Poland
- Voivodeship: Greater Poland
- County: Szamotuły
- Gmina: Pniewy

Koszanowo (Polish pronunciation: [kɔʂaˈnɔvɔ]) is a village in the administrative district of Gmina Pniewy, within Szamotuły County, Greater Poland Voivodeship, in west-central Poland.
