= Dolne Pole, Greater Poland Voivodeship =

Dolne Pole
- Village
- Location within Poland
- Coordinates: 52°30′N 16°37′E
- Country: Poland
- Voivodeship: Greater Poland
- County: Szamotuły
- Gmina: Kaźmierz

Dolne Pole [ˈdɔlnɛ ˈpɔlɛ] is a village in the administrative district of Gmina Kaźmierz, within Szamotuły County, Greater Poland Voivodeship, in west-central Poland.
