= Dęborzyce =

- Village
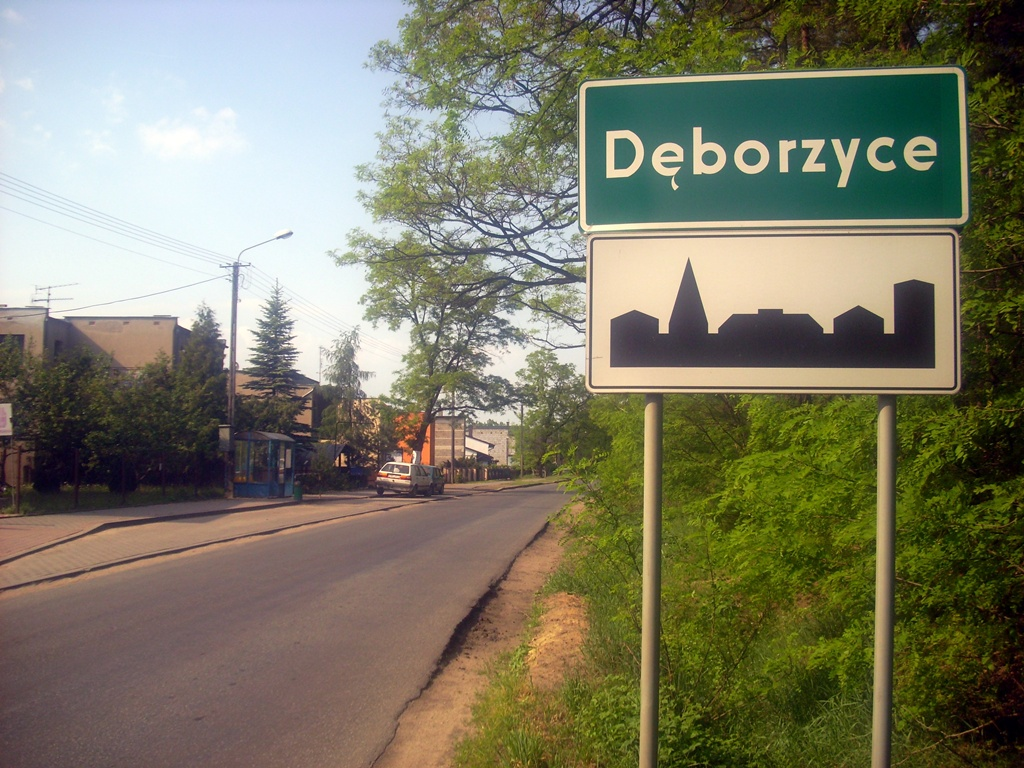

- Location within Poland
- Coordinates: 52°33′N 16°22′E
- Country: Poland
- Voivodeship: Greater Poland
- County: Szamotuły
- Gmina: Pniewy
- Highest elevation: 105 m (344 ft)
- Lowest elevation: 95 m (312 ft)
- Population: 200

Dęborzyce ([dɛmbɔˈʐɨt͡sɛ]; German: Zalewo) is a village in the administrative district of Gmina Pniewy, within Szamotuły County, Greater Poland Voivodeship, in west-central Poland.
