= Głuchowiec =

- Settlement
- Location within Poland
- Coordinates: 52°46′50″N 16°12′51″E
- Country: Poland
- Voivodeship: Greater Poland
- County: Szamotuły
- Gmina: Wronki
- Population: 13

Głuchowiec [ɡwuˈxɔvjɛt͡s] is a settlement in the administrative district of Gmina Wronki, within Szamotuły County, Greater Poland Voivodeship, in west-central Poland.
