= Sierpówko =

- Village
- Location within Poland
- Coordinates: 52°28′30″N 16°34′24″E
- Country: Poland
- Voivodeship: Greater Poland
- County: Szamotuły
- Gmina: Kaźmierz

Sierpówko [ɕɛrˈpufkɔ] is a village in the administrative district of Gmina Kaźmierz, within Szamotuły County, Greater Poland Voivodeship, in west-central Poland.
