= Dąbrowa, Gmina Pniewy =

Dąbrowa
- Settlement
- Location within Poland
- Coordinates: 52°28′41″N 16°14′34″E
- Country: Poland
- Voivodeship: Greater Poland
- County: Szamotuły
- Gmina: Pniewy

Dąbrowa [dɔmˈbrɔva] is a settlement in the administrative district of Gmina Pniewy, within Szamotuły County, Greater Poland Voivodeship, in west-central Poland.
