= Grodziszczko, Szamotuły County =

Grodziszczko
- Village
- Location within Poland
- Coordinates: 52°24′6″N 16°32′1″E
- Country: Poland
- Voivodeship: Greater Poland
- County: Szamotuły
- Gmina: Duszniki
- Population: 120

Grodziszczko [ɡrɔˈd͡ʑiʂt͡ʂkɔ] is a village in the administrative district of Gmina Duszniki, within Szamotuły County, Greater Poland Voivodeship, in west-central Poland.
