= Grzebienisko =

- Village
- Location within Poland
- Coordinates: 52°25′57″N 16°31′45″E
- Country: Poland
- Voivodeship: Greater Poland
- County: Szamotuły
- Gmina: Duszniki
- Population: 716

Grzebienisko [ɡʐɛbjɛˈniskɔ] is a village in the administrative district of Gmina Duszniki, within Szamotuły County, Greater Poland Voivodeship, in west-central Poland.
