= Wilkowo, Greater Poland Voivodeship =

Wilkowo
- Village
- Location within Poland
- Coordinates: 52°24′N 16°31′E
- Country: Poland
- Voivodeship: Greater Poland
- County: Szamotuły
- Gmina: Duszniki

Wilkowo [vilˈkɔvɔ] is a village in the administrative district of Gmina Duszniki, within Szamotuły County, Greater Poland Voivodeship, in west-central Poland.
