= Nadolnik, Szamotuły County =

Nadolnik
- Settlement
- Location within Poland
- Coordinates: 52°43′25″N 16°23′18″E
- Country: Poland
- Voivodeship: Greater Poland
- County: Szamotuły
- Gmina: Wronki
- Population: 11

Nadolnik [naˈdɔlnik] is a settlement in the administrative district of Gmina Wronki, within Szamotuły County, Greater Poland Voivodeship, in west-central Poland.
