= Nosalewo =

- Village
- Location within Poland
- Coordinates: 52°38′08″N 16°20′05″E
- Country: Poland
- Voivodeship: Greater Poland
- County: Szamotuły
- Gmina: Pniewy

Nosalewo [nɔsaˈlɛvɔ] is a village in the administrative district of Gmina Pniewy, within Szamotuły County, Greater Poland Voivodeship, in west-central Poland.
