= Przystanki =

- Village
- Location within Poland
- Coordinates: 52°31′N 16°24′E
- Country: Poland
- Voivodeship: Greater Poland
- County: Szamotuły
- Gmina: Pniewy

Przystanki [pʂɨsˈtanki] is a village in the administrative district of Gmina Pniewy, within Szamotuły County, Greater Poland Voivodeship, in west-central Poland.
