= Koźmin, Szamotuły County =

Koźmin
- Village
- Location within Poland
- Coordinates: 52°41′N 16°28′E
- Country: Poland
- Voivodeship: Greater Poland
- County: Szamotuły
- Gmina: Obrzycko
- Time zone: UTC+1 (CET)
  - Summer (DST): UTC+2 (CEST)
- Vehicle registration: PSZ

Koźmin [ˈkɔʑmin] is a village in the administrative district of Gmina Obrzycko, within Szamotuły County, Greater Poland Voivodeship, in west-central Poland.
