= Nowina, Szamotuły County =

Nowina
- Village
- Location within Poland
- Coordinates: 52°43′39″N 16°28′27″E
- Country: Poland
- Voivodeship: Greater Poland
- County: Szamotuły
- Gmina: Obrzycko

Nowina [nɔˈvina] is a village in the administrative district of Gmina Obrzycko, within Szamotuły County, Greater Poland Voivodeship, in west-central Poland.
