= Piaskowo =

Piaskowo may refer to the following places:

- Piaskowo, Gmina Szamotuły in Greater Poland Voivodeship (west-central Poland)
- Piaskowo, Gmina Ostroróg in Greater Poland Voivodeship (west-central Poland)
- Piaskowo, Pomeranian Voivodeship (north Poland)
- Piaskowo, Gryfino County in West Pomeranian Voivodeship (north-west Poland)
- Piaskowo, Koszalin County in West Pomeranian Voivodeship (north-west Poland)
