= Biezdrowo =

- Village
- Location within Poland
- Coordinates: 52°41′N 16°18′E
- Country: Poland
- Voivodeship: Greater Poland
- County: Szamotuły
- Gmina: Wronki
- Population: 416

Biezdrowo [bjɛzˈdrɔvɔ] is a village in the administrative district of Gmina Wronki, within Szamotuły County, Greater Poland Voivodeship, in west-central Poland.

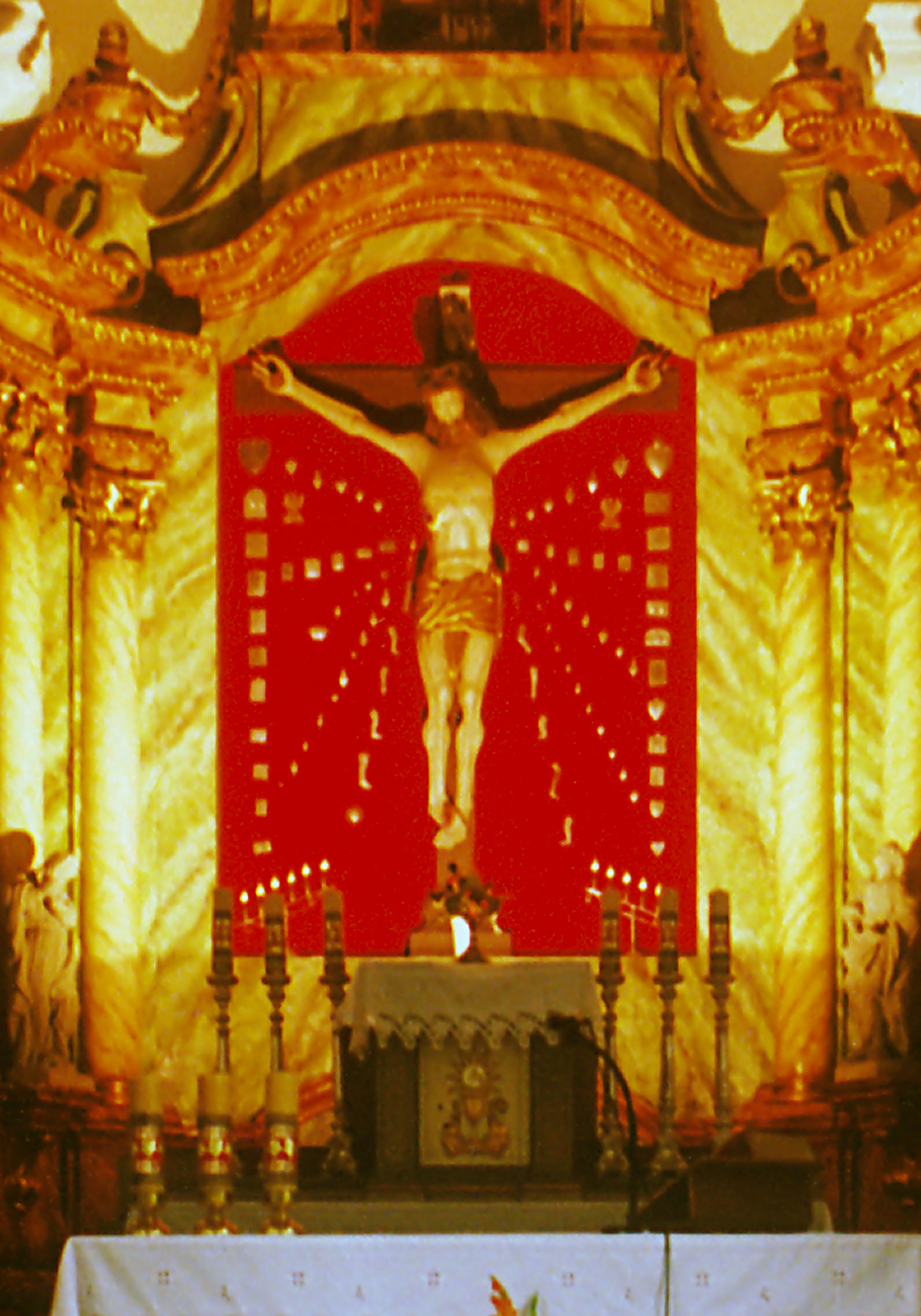
The Venerated Crucifix

== Shrine ==
There is a Church of Holy Cross and Saint Nicholas with a Venerated Crucifix from 15th or 16th century.
