= Nowy Kraków, Greater Poland Voivodeship =

Nowy Kraków
- Village
- Location within Poland
- Coordinates: 52°43′20″N 16°26′28″E
- Country: Poland
- Voivodeship: Greater Poland
- County: Szamotuły
- Gmina: Wronki
- Population: 21

Nowy Kraków [ˈnɔvɨ ˈkrakuf] is a village in the administrative district of Gmina Wronki, within Szamotuły County, Greater Poland Voivodeship, in west-central Poland.
