= Oporowo, Szamotuły County =

Oporowo
- Village
- Location within Poland
- Coordinates: 52°41′N 16°24′E
- Country: Poland
- Voivodeship: Greater Poland
- County: Szamotuły
- Gmina: Ostroróg

Oporowo [ɔpɔˈrɔvɔ] is a village in the administrative district of Gmina Ostroróg, within Szamotuły County, Greater Poland Voivodeship, in west-central Poland.
