= Gmina Pniewy =

Gmina Pniewy may refer to either of the following gminas (municipalities) in Poland:

- Gmina Pniewy, Masovian Voivodeship (east-central Poland)
- Gmina Pniewy, Greater Poland Voivodeship (west Poland)
