= Chojno-Błota Wielkie =

- Village
- Location within Poland
- Coordinates: 52°43′30″N 16°13′42″E
- Country: Poland
- Voivodeship: Greater Poland
- County: Szamotuły
- Gmina: Wronki
- Population: 61

Chojno-Błota Wielkie (Polish pronunciation: [ˈxɔjnɔ ˈbwɔta ˈvjɛlkʲɛ]) is a village in the administrative district of Gmina Wronki, within Szamotuły County, Greater Poland Voivodeship, in west-central Poland.
