= Dobrojewo, Greater Poland Voivodeship =

Dobrojewo
- Village
- Location within Poland
- Coordinates: 52°38′40″N 16°25′5″E
- Country: Poland
- Voivodeship: Greater Poland
- County: Szamotuły
- Gmina: Ostroróg

Dobrojewo [dɔbrɔˈjɛvɔ] is a village in the administrative district of Gmina Ostroróg, within Szamotuły County, Greater Poland Voivodeship, in west-central Poland.
