= Michał Sokolnicki =

Polish nobleman, general, and politician (1760–1816)

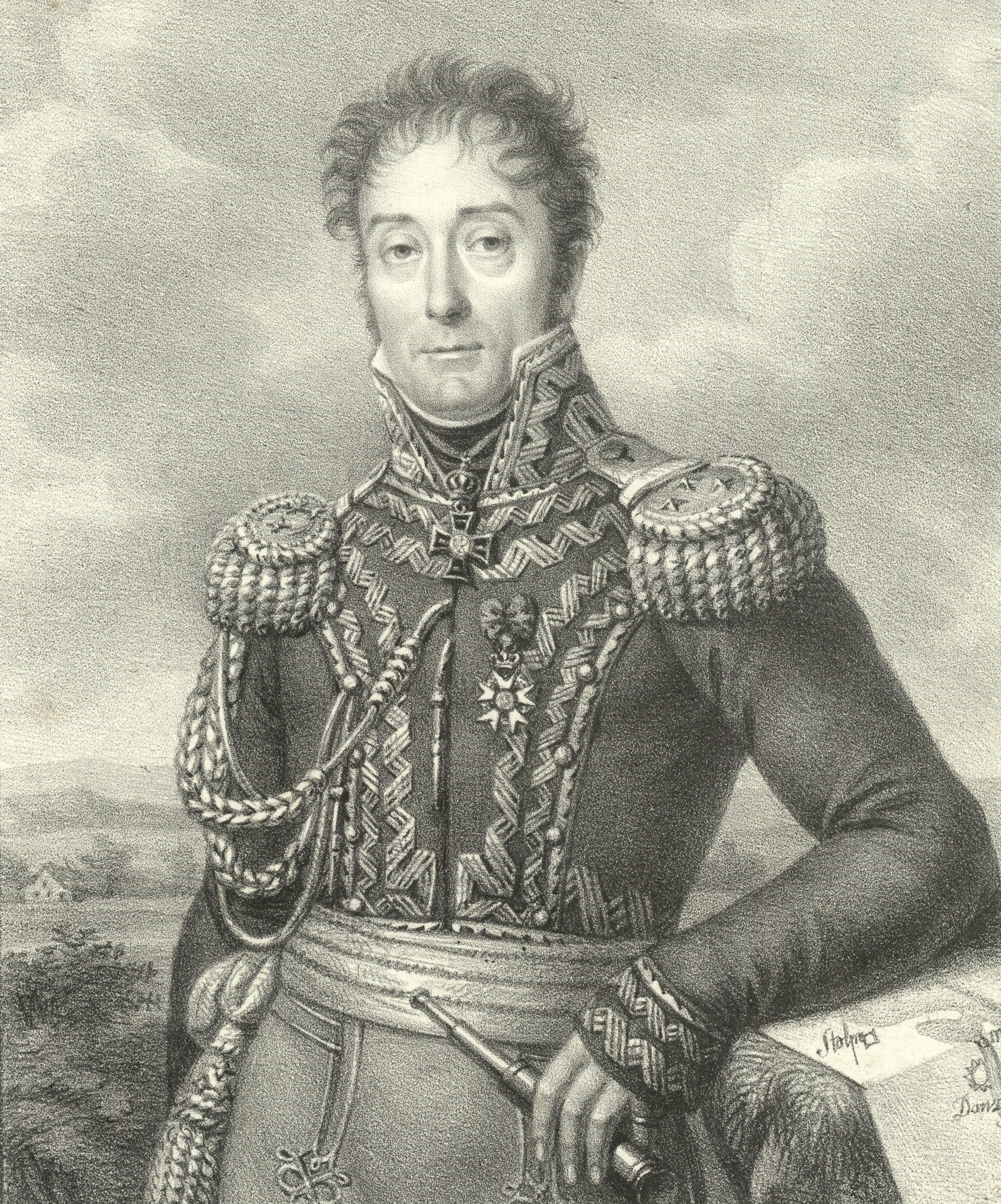
- Born: 1760; Wierzeja, Poznań Voivodeship, Kingdom of Poland, Polish–Lithuanian Commonwealth
- Died: 1816 (aged 55–56); Warsaw, Congress Poland, Russian Empire
- Military career
- Allegiance: Polish-Lithuanian Commonwealth; French First Republic; First French Empire; Duchy of Warsaw
- Branch: Army
- Service years: c. 1792–1815
- Rank: General
- Unit: Danube Legion
- Conflicts: Polish-Russian War of 1792; Kościuszko Uprising; Napoleonic Wars; War of the Fifth Coalition; Austro-Polish War; Napoleon's invasion of Russia
- Awards: Officer of the Legion of Honour; Commander’s Cross of the Virtuti Militari

Michał Sokolnicki (1760, in Wierzeja – 1816, in Warsaw) was a Polish nobleman (of Nowina coat of arms), general, military engineer, politician, and writer.

Sokolnicki studied in Warsaw's Corps of Cadets and fought in the Polish–Russian War of 1792 as well as the Kościuszko Uprising of 1794. In 1797 he presented the French Directory with a document entitled "Aperçu sur la Russie". This became known as the so-called "Testament of Peter the Great", which Napoleon Bonaparte used for anti-Russian propaganda purposes in 1812, and has been widely publicised since, although scholars have since established that the document is a forgery.

From 1797 on, Sokolnicki was a member of the Danube Legion and later of the Polish Legions in France under Napoleon. After 1808, he was a general in the army of the Duchy of Warsaw and took part in the Polish–Austrian War, where he was instrumental in defeating the Austrians in two major battles. Sokolnicki then took part in Napoleon's invasion of Russia. After Napoleon's defeat and the Duchy's occupation by Russia, he removed himself from public life and died in an accident in 1816.

Sokolnicki was awarded the Officer's Cross of the Legion of Honour (12 August) and the Commander's Cross of the Virtuti Militari (22 August 1809).
