= Wielonek, Greater Poland Voivodeship =

Wielonek
- Village
- Location within Poland
- Coordinates: 52°37′N 16°25′E
- Country: Poland
- Voivodeship: Greater Poland
- County: Szamotuły
- Gmina: Ostroróg

Wielonek [vjɛˈlɔnɛk] is a village in the administrative district of Gmina Ostroróg, within Szamotuły County, Greater Poland Voivodeship, in west-central Poland.
