= Binińskie Huby =

- Village
- Location within Poland
- Coordinates: 52°38′30″N 16°22′46″E
- Country: Poland
- Voivodeship: Greater Poland
- County: Szamotuły
- Gmina: Ostroróg

Binińskie Huby [biˈniɲskʲɛ ˈxubɨ] is a village in the administrative district of Gmina Ostroróg, within Szamotuły County, Greater Poland Voivodeship, in west-central Poland.
