= Rzecin =

- Village
- Location within Poland
- Coordinates: 52°46′2″N 16°17′51″E
- Country: Poland
- Voivodeship: Greater Poland
- County: Szamotuły
- Gmina: Wronki
- Population: 189

Rzecin ([ˈʐɛt͡ɕin]; German: Retschin) is a village in the administrative district of Gmina Wronki, within Szamotuły County, Greater Poland Voivodeship, in west-central Poland.
