= Pęckowo, Szamotuły County =

Pęckowo
- Village
- Location within Poland
- Coordinates: 52°40′N 16°29′E
- Country: Poland
- Voivodeship: Greater Poland
- County: Szamotuły
- Gmina: Obrzycko

Pęckowo [pɛnt͡sˈkɔvɔ] is a village in the administrative district of Gmina Obrzycko, within Szamotuły County, Greater Poland Voivodeship, in west-central Poland.
