= Pólko, Szamotuły County =

Pólko
- Village
- Location within Poland
- Coordinates: 52°31′19″N 16°27′51″E
- Country: Poland
- Voivodeship: Greater Poland
- County: Szamotuły
- Gmina: Kaźmierz
- Population: 300

Pólko [ˈpulkɔ] is a village in the administrative district of Gmina Kaźmierz, within Szamotuły County, Greater Poland Voivodeship, in west-central Poland.
