= Sokolniki Małe =

- Village
- Location within Poland
- Coordinates: 52°32′N 16°31′E
- Country: Poland
- Voivodeship: Greater Poland
- County: Szamotuły
- Gmina: Kaźmierz

Sokolniki Małe [sɔkɔlˈniki ˈmawɛ] is a village in the administrative district of Gmina Kaźmierz, within Szamotuły County, Greater Poland Voivodeship, in west-central Poland.
