= Józefowo, Szamotuły County =

Józefowo
- Village
- Location within Poland
- Coordinates: 52°39′20″N 16°16′58″E
- Country: Poland
- Voivodeship: Greater Poland
- County: Szamotuły
- Gmina: Wronki
- Population: 0

Józefowo (Polish pronunciation: [juzɛˈfɔvɔ]) is a former village in the administrative district of Gmina Wronki, within Szamotuły County, Greater Poland Voivodeship, in west-central Poland.
