= Kikowo, Greater Poland Voivodeship =

Kikowo
- Village
- Location within Poland
- Coordinates: 52°35′59″N 16°17′3″E
- Country: Poland
- Voivodeship: Greater Poland
- County: Szamotuły
- Gmina: Pniewy
- Population: 210

Kikowo [kiˈkɔvɔ] is a village in the administrative district of Gmina Pniewy, within Szamotuły County, Greater Poland Voivodeship, in west-central Poland.
