= Szklarnia, Greater Poland Voivodeship =

Szklarnia
- Village
- Location within Poland
- Coordinates: 52°43′02″N 16°20′52″E
- Country: Poland
- Voivodeship: Greater Poland
- County: Szamotuły
- Gmina: Wronki
- Population: 83

Szklarnia [ˈʂklarɲa] is a village in the administrative district of Gmina Wronki, within Szamotuły County, Greater Poland Voivodeship, in west-central Poland.
