= Lubosina =

- Village
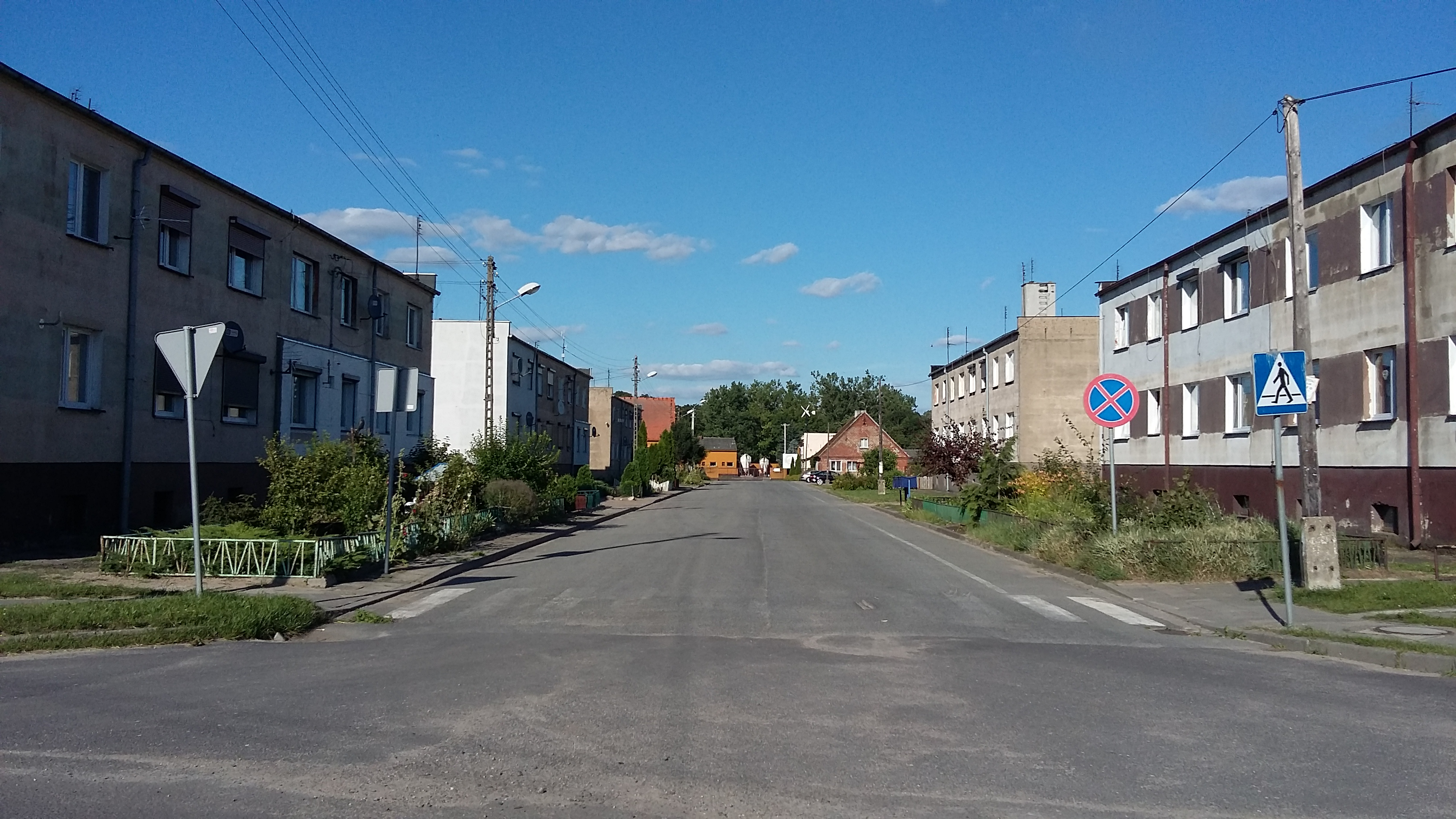
- Town centre

- Location within Poland
- Coordinates: 52°31′N 16°22′E
- Country: Poland
- Voivodeship: Greater Poland
- County: Szamotuły
- Gmina: Pniewy
- Population: 320

Lubosina [lubɔˈɕina] is a village in the administrative district of Gmina Pniewy, within Szamotuły County, Greater Poland Voivodeship, in west-central Poland.
