= Olesin, Szamotuły County =

Olesin
- Village
- Location within Poland
- Coordinates: 52°39′29″N 16°16′23″E
- Country: Poland
- Voivodeship: Greater Poland
- County: Szamotuły
- Gmina: Wronki
- Population: 7

Olesin [ɔˈlɛɕin] is a village in the administrative district of Gmina Wronki, within Szamotuły County, Greater Poland Voivodeship, in west-central Poland.
