= Sokolniki Wielkie =

- Village
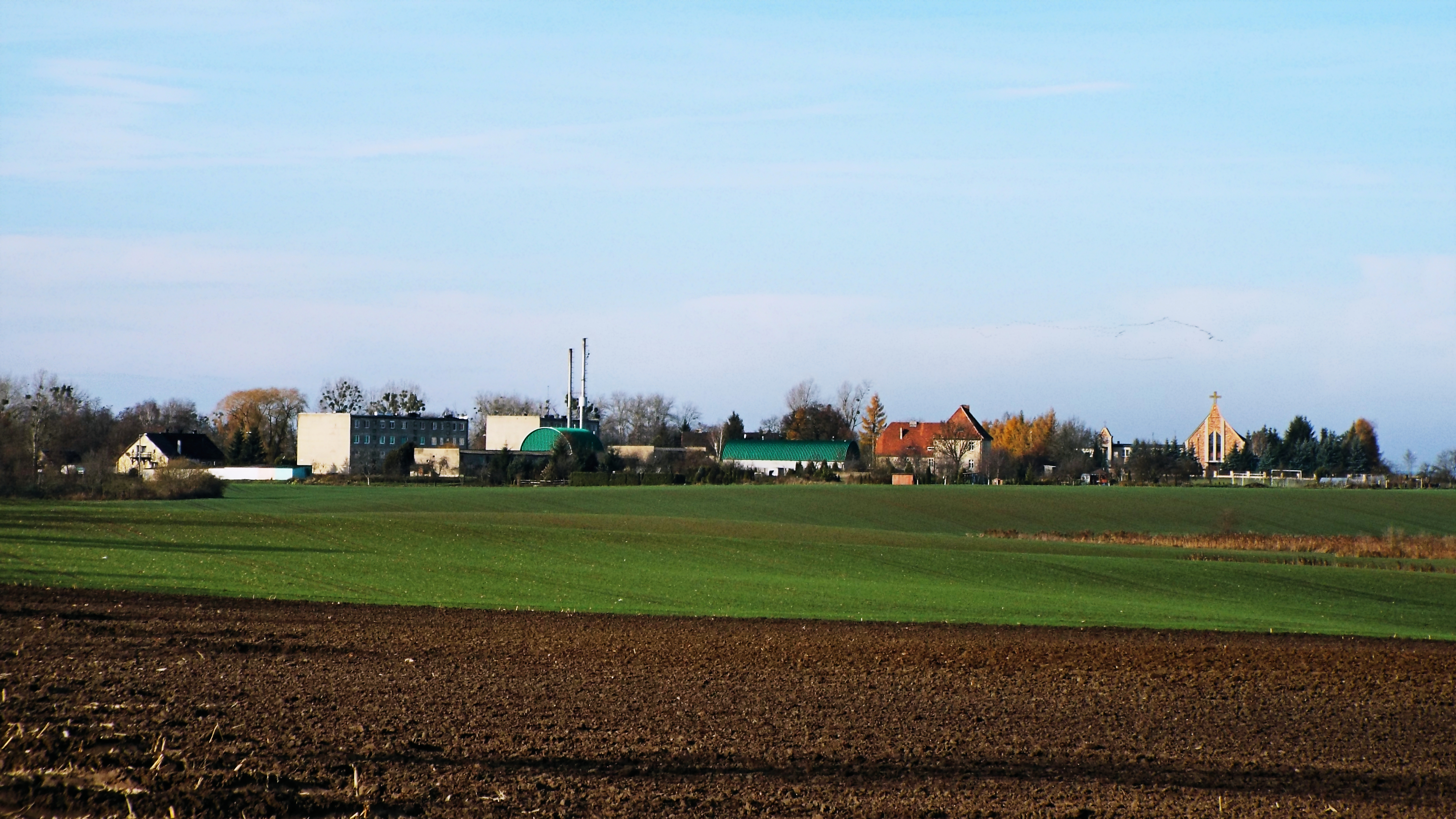
- Panorama of the village

- Location within Poland
- Coordinates: 52°32′N 16°30′E
- Country: Poland
- Voivodeship: Greater Poland
- County: Szamotuły
- Gmina: Kaźmierz

Sokolniki Wielkie [sɔkɔlˈniki ˈvjɛlkʲɛ] is a village in the administrative district of Gmina Kaźmierz, within Szamotuły County, Greater Poland Voivodeship, in west-central Poland.
