= Daniele, Greater Poland Voivodeship =

Daniele
- Village
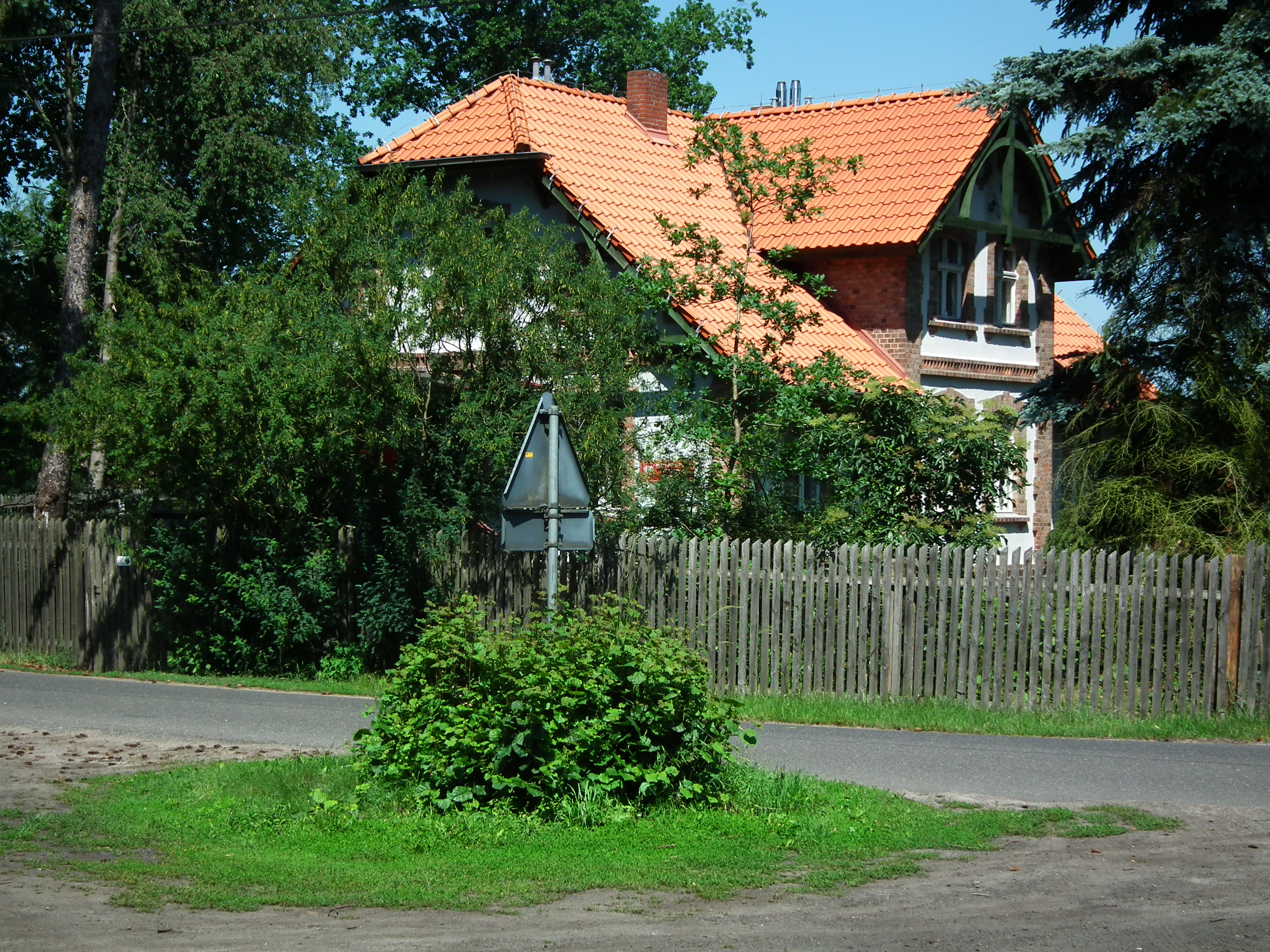
- Forester's lodge near Obrzycko

- Location within Poland
- Coordinates: 52°42′32″N 16°34′04″E
- Country: Poland
- Voivodeship: Greater Poland
- County: Szamotuły
- Gmina: Obrzycko

Daniele [daˈɲɛlɛ] is a village in the administrative district of Gmina Obrzycko, within Szamotuły County, Greater Poland Voivodeship, in west-central Poland.
