= Karmin, Szamotuły County =

Karmin
- Village
- Location within Poland
- Coordinates: 52°34′06″N 16°17′10″E
- Country: Poland
- Voivodeship: Greater Poland
- County: Szamotuły
- Gmina: Pniewy

Karmin [ˈkarmin] is a village in the administrative district of Gmina Pniewy, within Szamotuły County, Greater Poland Voivodeship, in west-central Poland.
