= Karolewo, Gmina Ostroróg =

Karolewo
- Village
- Location within Poland
- Coordinates: 52°37′24″N 16°28′57″E
- Country: Poland
- Voivodeship: Greater Poland
- County: Szamotuły
- Gmina: Ostroróg

Karolewo [karɔˈlɛvɔ] is a village in the administrative district of Gmina Ostroróg, within Szamotuły County, Greater Poland Voivodeship, in west-central Poland.
