= Nowa Wieś, Gmina Kaźmierz =

Nowa Wieś
- Village
- Location within Poland
- Coordinates: 52°30′53″N 16°34′23″E
- Country: Poland
- Voivodeship: Greater Poland
- County: Szamotuły
- Gmina: Kaźmierz
- Population: 1,100

Nowa Wieś [ˈnɔva ˈvjɛɕ] used to be a village in the administrative district of Gmina Kaźmierz, within Szamotuły County, Greater Poland Voivodeship, in west-central Poland. It is a part of Kaźmierz now.
