= Maszewice =

- Settlement
- Location within Poland
- Coordinates: 52°45′04″N 16°14′59″E
- Country: Poland
- Voivodeship: Greater Poland
- County: Szamotuły
- Gmina: Wronki
- Population: 7

Maszewice [maʂɛˈvit͡sɛ] is a settlement in the administrative district of Gmina Wronki, within Szamotuły County, Greater Poland Voivodeship, in west-central Poland.
