= Szymanowo, Szamotuły County =

Szymanowo
- Village
- Location within Poland
- Coordinates: 52°33′09″N 16°24′30″E
- Country: Poland
- Voivodeship: Greater Poland
- County: Szamotuły
- Gmina: Pniewy

Szymanowo (Polish pronunciation: [ʂɨmaˈnɔvɔ]) is a village in the administrative district of Gmina Pniewy, within Szamotuły County, Greater Poland Voivodeship, in west-central Poland.
