= Gaj Mały =

- Village
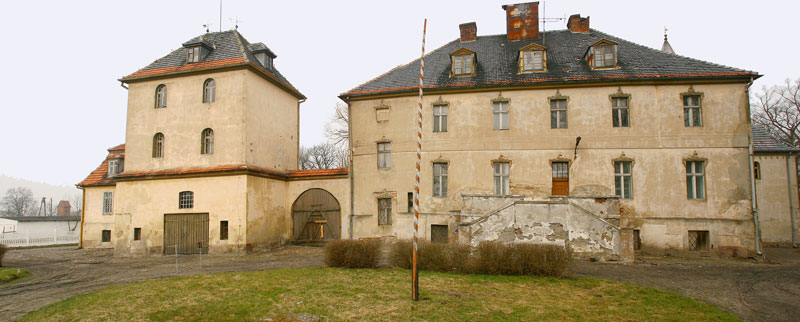
- Palace

- Location within Poland
- Coordinates: 52°38′N 16°32′E
- Country: Poland
- Voivodeship: Greater Poland
- County: Szamotuły
- Gmina: Obrzycko
- Elevation: 32 m (105 ft)

Gaj Mały (Polish pronunciation: [ɡaj ˈmawɨ]) is a village in the administrative district of Gmina Obrzycko, within Szamotuły County, Greater Poland Voivodeship, in west-central Poland.
