= Lutyniec =

Settlement in Poland

- Settlement
- Location within Poland
- Coordinates: 52°45′23″N 16°19′08″E
- Country: Poland
- Voivodeship: Greater Poland
- County: Szamotuły
- Gmina: Wronki
- Population: 4

Lutyniec [luˈtɨɲɛt͡s] is a settlement in the administrative district of Gmina Wronki, within Szamotuły County, Greater Poland Voivodeship, in west-central Poland.
