= Bugaj, Szamotuły County =

Bugaj
- Village
- Location within Poland
- Coordinates: 52°42′4.81″N 16°29′44.62″E
- Country: Poland
- Voivodeship: Greater Poland
- County: Szamotuły
- Gmina: Obrzycko

Bugaj [ˈbuɡai̯] is a village in the administrative district of Gmina Obrzycko, within Szamotuły County, Greater Poland Voivodeship, in west-central Poland.
