= Karolewo, Gmina Wronki =

Karolewo
- Village
- Location within Poland
- Coordinates: 52°41′46″N 16°13′19″E
- Country: Poland
- Voivodeship: Greater Poland
- County: Szamotuły
- Gmina: Wronki

Karolewo [karɔˈlɛvɔ] is a village in the administrative district of Gmina Wronki, within Szamotuły County, Greater Poland Voivodeship, in west-central Poland.
