= Sarbia, Szamotuły County =

Sarbia
- Village
- Location within Poland
- Coordinates: 52°26′N 16°28′E
- Country: Poland
- Voivodeship: Greater Poland
- County: Szamotuły
- Gmina: Duszniki

Sarbia [ˈsarbja] is a village that is located in the administrative district of Gmina Duszniki, within Szamotuły County, Greater Poland Voivodeship, in west-central Poland.
