= Gogolice =

Gogolice may refer to the following places:

- Gogolice, Greater Poland Voivodeship (west-central Poland)
- Gogolice, Gryfino County in West Pomeranian Voivodeship (north-west Poland)
- Gogolice, Kamień County in West Pomeranian Voivodeship (north-west Poland)
