= Brączewo =

- Village
- Location within Poland
- Coordinates: 52°42′3″N 16°36′16″E
- Country: Poland
- Voivodeship: Greater Poland
- County: Szamotuły
- Gmina: Obrzycko
- Population: 120

Brączewo [brɔnˈt͡ʂɛvɔ] is a village in the administrative district of Gmina Obrzycko, within Szamotuły County, Greater Poland Voivodeship, in west-central Poland.
