= Rudki-Huby =

- Village
- Location within Poland
- Coordinates: 52°36′11″N 16°27′44″E
- Country: Poland
- Voivodeship: Greater Poland
- County: Szamotuły
- Gmina: Ostroróg

Rudki-Huby [ˈrutki ˈxubɨ] is a village in the administrative district of Gmina Ostroróg, within Szamotuły County, Greater Poland Voivodeship, in west-central Poland.
