= Karol Hoffmann (born 1913) =

Polish athletics competitor

Personal information
- Nationality: Polish
- Born: 10 August 1913 Orliczko, German Empire
- Died: 28 February 1971 (aged 57) Poznań, Poland

Sport
- Sport: Athletics
- Events: Triple jump High jump

Karol Hoffmann (10 August 1913 – 28 February 1971) was a Polish athlete. He competed in the men's triple jump and the men's high jump at the 1936 Summer Olympics.
