= Słopanowo-Huby =

- Village
- Location within Poland
- Coordinates: 52°40′58″N 16°31′47″E
- Country: Poland
- Voivodeship: Greater Poland
- County: Szamotuły
- Gmina: Obrzycko

Słopanowo-Huby [swɔpaˈnɔvɔ ˈxubɨ] is a village in the administrative district of Gmina Obrzycko, within Szamotuły County, Greater Poland Voivodeship, in west-central Poland.
