= Chraplewo, Szamotuły County =

Chraplewo
- Village
- Location within Poland
- Coordinates: 52°43′15″N 16°32′01″E
- Country: Poland
- Voivodeship: Greater Poland
- County: Szamotuły
- Gmina: Obrzycko

Chraplewo [xraˈplɛvɔ] is a village in the administrative district of Gmina Obrzycko, within Szamotuły County, Greater Poland Voivodeship, in west-central Poland.
