= Psarce =

- Village
- Location within Poland
- Coordinates: 52°33′19″N 16°15′57″E
- Country: Poland
- Voivodeship: Greater Poland
- County: Szamotuły
- Gmina: Pniewy
- Population: 50

Psarce [ˈpsart͡sɛ] is a village in the administrative district of Gmina Pniewy, within Szamotuły County, Greater Poland Voivodeship, in west-central Poland.
