= Mieściska =

- Village
- Location within Poland
- Coordinates: 52°27′N 16°29′E
- Country: Poland
- Voivodeship: Greater Poland
- County: Szamotuły
- Gmina: Duszniki
- Population: 120

Mieściska [mjɛɕˈt͡ɕiska] is a village in the administrative district of Gmina Duszniki, within Szamotuły County, Greater Poland Voivodeship, in west-central Poland.
