= Kluczewo =

Kluczewo may refer to:

- Kluczewo Airfield, a former Soviet air base
- Kluczewo, Szamotuły County in Greater Poland Voivodeship (west-central Poland)
- Kluczewo, Masovian Voivodeship (east-central Poland)
- Kluczewo, Wolsztyn County in Greater Poland Voivodeship (west-central Poland)
- Kluczewo, West Pomeranian Voivodeship (north-west Poland)
