= Brzezno, Greater Poland Voivodeship =

Brzezno
- Village
- Location within Poland
- Coordinates: 52°29′29″N 16°37′18″E
- Country: Poland
- Voivodeship: Greater Poland
- County: Szamotuły
- Gmina: Kaźmierz
- Population: 540

Brzezno [ˈbʐɛznɔ] is a village in the administrative district of Gmina Kaźmierz, within Szamotuły County, Greater Poland Voivodeship, in west-central Poland.
