= Krasnobrzeg, Greater Poland Voivodeship =

Krasnobrzeg
- Settlement
- Location within Poland
- Coordinates: 52°43′17″N 16°17′03″E
- Country: Poland
- Voivodeship: Greater Poland
- County: Szamotuły
- Gmina: Wronki
- Population: 1

Krasnobrzeg [krasˈnɔbʐɛk] is a settlement in the administrative district of Gmina Wronki, within Szamotuły County, Greater Poland Voivodeship, in west-central Poland.
