= Kluczewo, Szamotuły County =

Kluczewo
- Village
- Location within Poland
- Coordinates: 52°38′N 16°30′E
- Country: Poland
- Voivodeship: Greater Poland
- County: Szamotuły
- Gmina: Ostroróg

Kluczewo [kluˈt͡ʂɛvɔ] is a village in the administrative district of Gmina Ostroróg, within Szamotuły County, Greater Poland Voivodeship, in west-central Poland.
