= Gmina Kaźmierz =

Gmina Kaźmierz Kaźmierz Commune
- Gmina
- Coat of arms
- Interactive map of Gmina Kaźmierz
- Coordinates (Kaźmierz): 52°30′47″N 16°35′11″E
- Country: Poland
- Voivodeship: Greater Poland
- County: Szamotuły
- Seat: Kaźmierz

Area
  - Total: 128.2 km^{2} (49.5 sq mi)

Population (2006)
  - Total: 7,242
  - Density: 56.49/km^{2} (146.3/sq mi)
- Website: http://www.kazmierz.pl

Gmina Kaźmierz is a rural gmina (administrative district) in Szamotuły County, Greater Poland Voivodeship, in west-central Poland. Its seat is the village of Kaźmierz, which lies approximately 10 kilometres (6 mi) south of Szamotuły and 26 km (16 mi) north-west of the regional capital Poznań.

The gmina covers an area of 128.2 square kilometres (49.5 sq mi), and as of 2006 its total population is 7,242.

== Villages ==
Gmina Kaźmierz contains the villages and settlements of Brzezno, Bytyń, Chlewiska, Dolne Pole, Gaj Wielki, Gorszewice, Kaźmierz, Kiączyn, Komorowo, Kopanina, Młodasko, Nowa Wieś, Piersko, Pólko, Radzyny, Sierpówko, Sokolniki Małe, Sokolniki Wielkie and Witkowice.

== Neighbouring gminas ==
Gmina Kaźmierz is bordered by the gminas of Duszniki, Rokietnica, Szamotuły and Tarnowo Podgórne.
