= Lubowo, Greater Poland Voivodeship =

Lubowo
- Village
- Location within Poland
- Coordinates: 52°42′34″N 16°15′28″E
- Country: Poland
- Voivodeship: Greater Poland
- County: Szamotuły
- Gmina: Wronki
- Population: 88

Lubowo [luˈbɔvɔ] is a village in the administrative district of Gmina Wronki, within Szamotuły County, Greater Poland Voivodeship, in west-central Poland.
