= Gmina Obrzycko =

Gmina Obrzycko Obrzycko Commune
- Gmina
- Coat of arms
- Interactive map of Gmina Obrzycko
- Coordinates (Obrzycko): 52°42′23″N 16°31′45″E
- Country: Poland
- Voivodeship: Greater Poland
- County: Szamotuły
- Seat: Obrzycko

Area
  - Total: 110.65 km^{2} (42.72 sq mi)

Population (2006)
  - Total: 4,219
  - Density: 38.13/km^{2} (98.75/sq mi)
- Website: http://www.obrzycko.pl/

Gmina Obrzycko is a rural gmina (administrative district) in Szamotuły County, Greater Poland Voivodeship, in west-central Poland. Its seat is the town of Obrzycko, although the town is not part of the territory of the gmina.

The gmina covers an area of 110.65 square kilometres (42.7 sq mi), and as of 2006 its total population is 4,219.

== Villages ==
Gmina Obrzycko contains the villages and settlements of Annogóra, Antoniny, Borownik, Brączewo, Bugaj, Chraplewo, Daniele, Dobrogostowo, Gaj Mały, Jaryszewo, Karczemka, Karolin, Kobylniki, Koźmin, Lizbona, Modrak, Nowina, Obrowo, Obrzycko-Zamek, Ordzin, Pęckowo, Piotrowo, Słopanowo, Słopanowo-Huby, Stobnicko and Zielonagóra.

== Neighbouring gminas ==
Gmina Obrzycko is bordered by the gminas of Lubasz, Oborniki, Ostroróg, Połajewo, Szamotuły and Wronki.
