= Orliczko =

- Village
- Location within Poland
- Coordinates: 52°37′N 16°20′E
- Country: Poland
- Voivodeship: Greater Poland
- County: Szamotuły
- Gmina: Pniewy

Orliczko ([ɔrˈlit͡ʂkɔ]; German: Orlitschko) is a village in the administrative district of Gmina Pniewy, within Szamotuły County, Greater Poland Voivodeship, in west-central Poland.
