= Gogolice, Greater Poland Voivodeship =

Gogolice
- Settlement
- Location within Poland
- Coordinates: 52°45′40″N 16°07′51″E
- Country: Poland
- Voivodeship: Greater Poland
- County: Szamotuły
- Gmina: Wronki
- Population: 10

Gogolice [ɡɔɡɔˈlit͡sɛ] is a settlement in the administrative district of Gmina Wronki, within Szamotuły County, Greater Poland Voivodeship, in west-central Poland.
