= Gmina Ostroróg =

Gmina Ostroróg Ostroróg Commune
- Gmina
- Flag Coat of arms
- Interactive map of Gmina Ostroróg
- Coordinates (Ostroróg): 52°38′N 16°28′E
- Country: Poland
- Voivodeship: Greater Poland
- County: Szamotuły
- Seat: Ostroróg

Area
  - Total: 84.99 km^{2} (32.81 sq mi)

Population (2006)
  - Total: 4,865
  - Density: 57.24/km^{2} (148.3/sq mi)
  - Urban: 1,995
  - Rural: 2,870
- Website: http://www.ostrorog.pl/

Gmina Ostroróg is an urban-rural gmina (administrative district) in Szamotuły County, Greater Poland Voivodeship, in west-central Poland. Its seat is the town of Ostroróg, which lies approximately 9 kilometres (6 mi) north-west of Szamotuły and 40 km (25 mi) north-west of the regional capital Poznań.

The gmina covers an area of 84.99 square kilometres (32.8 sq mi), and as of 2006 its total population is 4,865 (out of which the population of Ostroróg amounts to 1,995, and the population of the rural part of the gmina is 2,870).

== Villages ==
Apart from the town of Ostroróg, Gmina Ostroróg contains the villages and settlements of Bielejewo, Binino, Binińskie Huby, Bobulczyn, Dobrojewo, Forestowo, Karolewo, Klemensowo, Kluczewo, Kluczewo-Huby, Oporowo, Piaskowo, Rudki, Rudki-Huby, Szczepankowo, Wielonek and Zapust.

== Neighbouring gminas ==
Gmina Ostroróg is bordered by the gminas of Obrzycko, Pniewy, Szamotuły and Wronki.
