= Szczepankowo, Greater Poland Voivodeship =

Szczepankowo
- Village
- Location within Poland
- Coordinates: 52°37′N 16°31′E
- Country: Poland
- Voivodeship: Greater Poland
- County: Szamotuły
- Gmina: Ostroróg

Szczepankowo [ʂt͡ʂɛpanˈkɔvɔ] is a village in the administrative district of Gmina Ostroróg, within Szamotuły County, Greater Poland Voivodeship, in west-central Poland.
