= Gmina Wronki =

Gmina Wronki Wronki Commune
- Gmina
- Flag Coat of arms
- Interactive map of Gmina Wronki
- Coordinates (Wronki): 52°42′N 16°23′E
- Country: Poland
- Voivodeship: Greater Poland
- County: Szamotuły
- Seat: Wronki

Area
  - Total: 302.07 km^{2} (116.63 sq mi)

Population (2006)
  - Total: 18,713
  - Density: 61.949/km^{2} (160.45/sq mi)
  - Urban: 11,551
  - Rural: 7,162
- Website: http://www.wronki.pl

Gmina Wronki is an urban-rural gmina (administrative district) in Szamotuły County, Greater Poland Voivodeship, in west-central Poland. Its seat is the town of Wronki, which lies approximately 18 kilometres (11 mi) north-west of Szamotuły and 50 km (31 mi) north-west of the regional capital Poznań.

The gmina covers an area of 302.07 square kilometres (116.6 sq mi), and as of 2006 its total population is 18,713 (out of which the population of Wronki amounts to 11,551, and the population of the rural part of the gmina is 7,162).

== Villages ==
Apart from the town of Wronki, Gmina Wronki contains the villages and settlements of Aleksandrowo, Biezdrowo, Borek, Chojno, Chojno-Błota Małe, Chojno-Błota Wielkie, Chojno-Leśniczówka, Chojno-Młyn, Ćmachowo, Dąbrowa, Dębogóra, Głuchowiec, Głuchowo, Gogolice, Huby-Oporowo, Jasionna, Józefowo, Karolewo, Kłodzisko, Krasnobrzeg, Lubowo, Lubowo Drugie, Łucjanowo, Lutyniec, Marianowo, Maszewice, Mokrz, Nadolnik, Nowa Wieś, Nowy Kraków, Obelżanki, Olesin, Olin, Oporowo-Huby, Pakawie, Pierwoszewo, Piła, Popowo, Pożarowo, Pustelnia, Rzecin, Samita, Samołęż, Smolnica, Stare Miasto, Stróżki, Szklarnia, Szostaki, Tomaszewo, Warszawa, Wartosław, Wierzchocin, Winnogóra, Wróblewo and Zdroje.

== Neighbouring gminas ==
Gmina Wronki is bordered by the gminas of Chrzypsko Wielkie, Drawsko, Lubasz, Obrzycko, Ostroróg, Pniewy, Sieraków and Wieleń.
