= Gmina Duszniki =

Gmina Duszniki Duszniki Commune
- Gmina
- Flag Coat of arms
- Interactive map of Gmina Duszniki
- Coordinates (Duszniki): 52°27′1″N 16°24′12″E
- Country: Poland
- Voivodeship: Greater Poland
- County: Szamotuły
- Seat: Duszniki

Area
  - Total: 156.28 km^{2} (60.34 sq mi)

Population (2006)
  - Total: 8,160
  - Density: 52.2/km^{2} (135/sq mi)
- Website: http://www.duszniki.eu/

Gmina Duszniki is a rural gmina (administrative district) in Szamotuły County, Greater Poland Voivodeship, in west-central Poland. Its seat is the village of Duszniki, which lies approximately 21 kilometres (13 mi) south-west of Szamotuły and 36 km (22 mi) west of the regional capital Poznań.

The gmina covers an area of 156.28 square kilometres (60.3 sq mi), and as of 2006 its total population is 8,160.

== Villages ==
Gmina Duszniki contains the villages and settlements of Brzoza, Ceradz Dolny, Chełminko, Duszniki, Grodziszczko, Grzebienisko, Kunowo, Mieściska, Młynkowo, Niewierz, Podrzewie, Sarbia, Sędzinko, Sędziny, Sękowo, Wierzeja, Wilczyna, Wilkowo, Zakrzewko and Zalesie.

== Neighbouring gminas ==
Gmina Duszniki is bordered by the gminas of Buk, Kaźmierz, Kuślin, Lwówek, Opalenica, Pniewy and Tarnowo Podgórne.

== International relations ==
=== Twin towns — Sister cities ===
- Illuka Parish, Estonia
