= Pustelnia, Greater Poland Voivodeship =

Pustelnia
- Settlement
- Location within Poland
- Coordinates: 52°41′51″N 16°09′40″E
- Country: Poland
- Voivodeship: Greater Poland
- County: Szamotuły
- Gmina: Wronki
- Population: 4

Pustelnia [pusˈtɛlɲa] is a settlement in the administrative district of Gmina Wronki, within Szamotuły County, Greater Poland Voivodeship, in west-central Poland.
