= Kaźmierz =

- Village
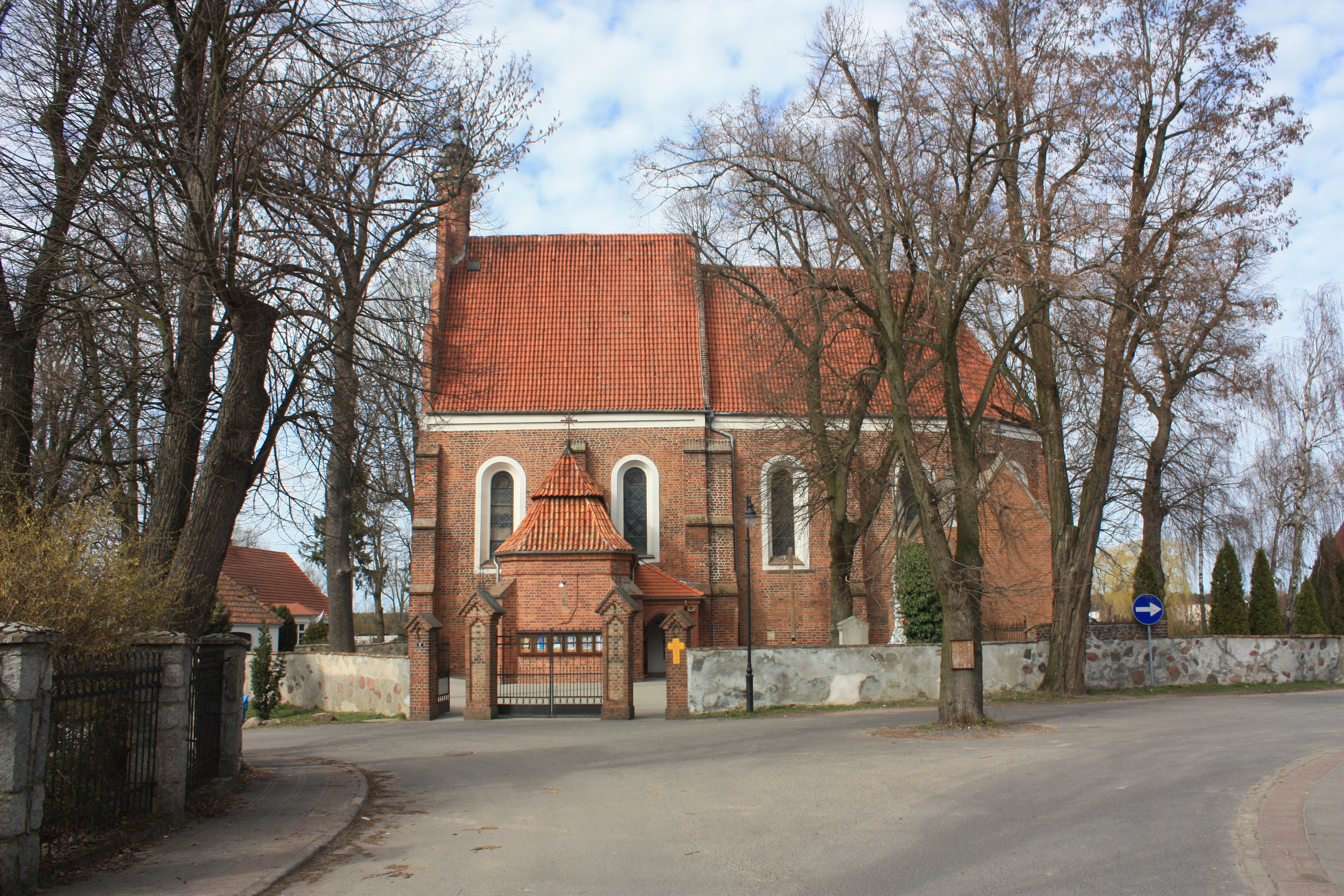
- Church of the Nativity of the Virgin Mary

- Location within Poland
- Coordinates: 52°30′47″N 16°35′11″E
- Country: Poland
- Voivodeship: Greater Poland
- County: Szamotuły
- Gmina: Kaźmierz

Population
  - Total: 1,536
- Website: https://www.kazmierz.pl

Kaźmierz [ˈkaʑmjɛʂ] is a village in Szamotuły County, Greater Poland Voivodeship, in west-central Poland. It is the seat of the gmina (administrative district) called Gmina Kaźmierz.
