= Duszniki, Greater Poland Voivodeship =

Duszniki
- Village
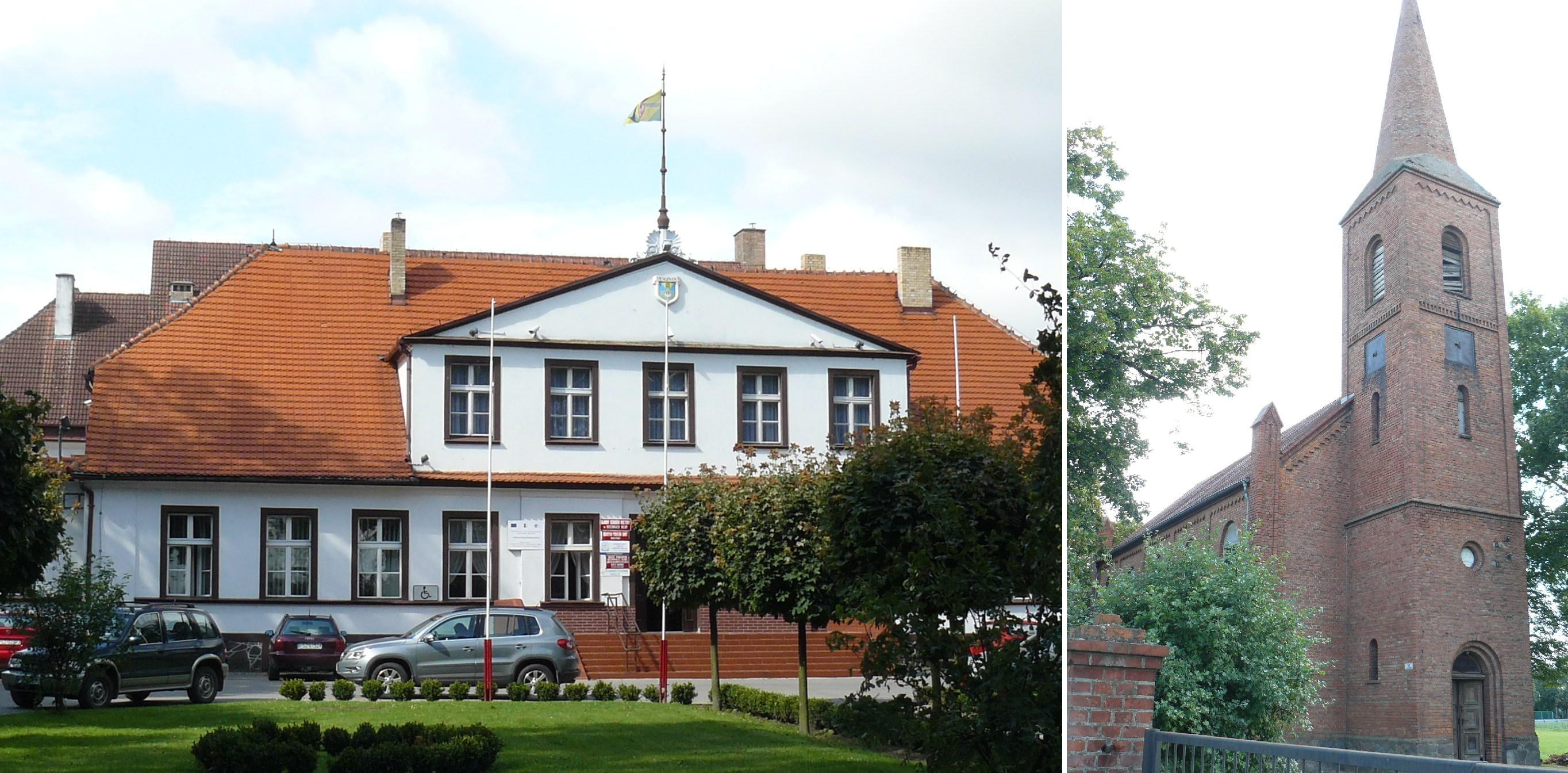
- Manor house and former Protestant church

- Location within Poland
- Coordinates: 52°27′N 16°24′E
- Country: Poland
- Voivodeship: Greater Poland
- County: Szamotuły
- Gmina: Duszniki

Population
  - Total: 2,100
- Website: http://www.duszniki.eu/

Duszniki [duʂˈniki] is a village in Szamotuły County, Greater Poland Voivodeship, in west-central Poland. It is the seat of the gmina (administrative district) called Gmina Duszniki.

== Notable people ==
- Piotr Lisek, Polish pole vaulter
