= Gmina Pniewy, Greater Poland Voivodeship =

Gmina Pniewy Pniewy Commune
- Gmina
- Flag Coat of arms
- Interactive map of Gmina Pniewy
- Coordinates (Pniewy): 52°31′N 16°16′E
- Country: Poland
- Voivodeship: Greater Poland
- County: Szamotuły
- Seat: Pniewy

Area
  - Total: 158.57 km^{2} (61.22 sq mi)

Population (2006)
  - Total: 11,905
  - Density: 75.077/km^{2} (194.45/sq mi)
  - Urban: 7,464
  - Rural: 4,441
- Website: http://www.pniewy.wlkp.pl/

Gmina Pniewy is an urban-rural gmina (administrative district) in Szamotuły County, Greater Poland Voivodeship, in west-central Poland. Its seat is the town of Pniewy, which lies approximately 24 kilometres (15 mi) south-west of Szamotuły and 46 km (29 mi) west of the regional capital Poznań.

The gmina covers an area of 158.57 square kilometres (61.2 sq mi), and as of 2006 its total population is 11,905 (out of which the population of Pniewy amounts to 7,464, and the population of the rural part of the gmina is 4,441).

== Villages ==
Apart from the town of Pniewy, Gmina Pniewy contains the villages and settlements of Berdychowo, Buszewko, Buszewo, Chełmno, Dąbrowa, Dębina, Dęborzyce, Jakubowo, Karmin, Kikowo, Konin, Konin-Huby, Koninek, Koszanowo, Lubocześnica, Lubosina, Nojewo, Nosalewo, Orliczko, Podborowo, Podpniewki, Przystanki, Psarce, Psarskie, Rudka, Szymanowo, Turowo, Zajączkowo and Zamorze.

== Neighbouring gminas ==
Gmina Pniewy is bordered by the gminas of Chrzypsko Wielkie, Duszniki, Kwilcz, Lwówek, Ostroróg, Szamotuły and Wronki.
