= Szamotuły County =

Szamotuły County Powiat szamotulski
- County
- Flag Coat of arms

- Location within the voivodeship
- Coordinates (Szamotuły): 52°36′N 16°35′E
- Country: Poland
- Voivodeship: Greater Poland
- Seat: Szamotuły
- Gminas: Total 8 (incl. 1 urban): Obrzycko; Gmina Duszniki; Gmina Kaźmierz; Gmina Obrzycko; Gmina Ostroróg; Gmina Pniewy; Gmina Szamotuły; Gmina Wronki

Area
  - Total: 1,119.55 km^{2} (432.26 sq mi)

Population (2006)
  - Total: 85,849
  - Density: 76.682/km^{2} (198.60/sq mi)
  - Urban: 41,940
  - Rural: 43,909
- Car plates: PSZ
- Website: www.powiat-szamotuly.pl

Szamotuły County (Polish: powiat szamotulski) is a unit of territorial administration and local government (powiat) in Greater Poland Voivodeship, west-central Poland. It came into existence on January 1, 1999, as a result of the Polish local government reforms passed in 1998. Its administrative seat and largest town is Szamotuły, which lies 32 kilometres (20 mi) north-west of the regional capital Poznań. The county contains four other towns: Wronki, 18 km (11 mi) north-west of Szamotuły, Pniewy, 24 km (15 mi) south-west of Szamotuły, Obrzycko, 13 km (8 mi) north of Szamotuły, and Ostroróg, 9 km (6 mi) north-west of Szamotuły.

The county covers an area of 1,119.55 square kilometres (432.3 sq mi). As of 2006 its total population is 85,849, out of which the population of Szamotuły is 18,760, that of Wronki is 11,551, that of Pniewy is 7,464, that of Obrzycko is 2,170, that of Ostroróg is 1,995, and the rural population is 43,909.

== Neighbouring counties ==
Szamotuły County is bordered by Czarnków-Trzcianka County to the north, Oborniki County to the east, Poznań County to the south-east, Nowy Tomyśl County to the south-west and Międzychód County to the west.

== Administrative divisions ==
The county is subdivided into eight gminas (one urban, four urban-rural and three rural). These are listed in the following table, in descending order of population.

Gmina	Type	Area (km^{2})	Population (2006)	Seat
Gmina Szamotuły	urban-rural	175.1	28,575	Szamotuły
Gmina Wronki	urban-rural	302.1	18,713	Wronki
Gmina Pniewy	urban-rural	158.6	11,905	Pniewy
Gmina Duszniki	rural	156.3	8,160	Duszniki
Gmina Kaźmierz	rural	128.2	7,242	Kaźmierz
Gmina Ostroróg	urban-rural	85.0	4,865	Ostroróg
Gmina Obrzycko	rural	110.7	4,219	Obrzycko *
Obrzycko	urban	3.7	2,170	
* seat not part of the gmina
