= List of aerial victories of Josef Mai =

Josef Mai (1887-1982) was a German First World War fighter ace credited with 30 confirmed and 15 unconfirmed aerial victories while flying combat for Jagdstaffel 5. While flying for them as a sergeant pilot, he shot down enemy aircraft from August 1917 until war's end. Mai was noted as being one of a trio of high-scoring sergeant pilots called the Golden Triumvirate whose collective victories for Jagdstaffel 5 totaled more than 100; the other two aces were Otto Könnecke and Fritz Rumey.

== List of victories ==
Victories are reported in chronological order. Where aircrew casualties are reported, the pilot's name is listed first, followed by that of the observer/gunner.

This list is complete for entries, though obviously not for all details. Background data was abstracted from Above the Lines: The Aces and Fighter Units of the German Air Service, Naval Air Service and Flanders Marine Corps, 1914–1918, ISBN 978-0-948817-73-1, pp. 100–101, and The Aerodrome webpage on Josef Mai . Abbreviations were expanded by the editor creating this list.

No.	Date	Time	Foe	Unit	Location	Notes
1	20 August 1917	0905 hours	Sopwith Camel	No. 70 Squadron, RFC	Rumaucourt, France	
2	25 August 1917	1825 hours	Airco DH.5	No. 41 Squadron RFC	Selvigny, France	
3	20 November 1917	0840 hours	Sopwith Camel	No. 3 Squadron RFC	West of Estourmel, France	
4	22 November 1917	0840 hours	Bristol F.2 Fighter		Between Cantaing and Anneux, France	No British losses recorded
5	30 November 1917	1548 hours	Royal Aircraft Factory SE.5a	No. 56 Squadron RFC	Le Pave	
6	13 January 1918	1158 hours	Bristol F.2 Fighter	No. 11 Squadron RFC	West of Gonnelieu, France	Bristol not destroyed, but forced to land
7	28 January 1918	1210 hours	Bristol F.2 Fighter	No. 11 Squadron RFC	Bourlon Wood, France	
8	6 March 1918	1110 hours	Airco DH.4	No. 27 Squadron RFC	Northwest of Fresnoy-le-Grand, France	
9	6 March 1918	1110 hours	Airco DH.4	No. 5 Naval Squadron, RNAS	Saint-Benin, France	
10	25 April 1918	1825 hours	Sopwith Camel	No. 65 Squadron, RAF	Dommart	Future ace Maurice Newnham downed
11	2 May 1918	1415 hours	Sopwith Camel	No. 65 Squadron RAF	Morcourt, France	
12	15 May 1918	1815 hours	Bristol F.2 Fighter	No. 11 Squadron RAF	Contalmaison, France	Ace Charles Robson POW; ace Herbert Sellars KIA
13	20 May 1918	1905 hours	Sopwith Camel	No. 65 Squadron RAF	Morlancourt, France	
14	2 June 1918	1911 hours	Sopwith Camel	No. 65 Squadron RAF	South of Hangard, France	
15	27 June 1918	2133 hours	Sopwith Camel	No. 70 Squadron RAF	Thiepval, France	
16	5 July 1918	2120 hours	Bristol F.2 Fighter	No. 48 Squadron RAF	Guillemont, France	
17	20 July 1918	1205 hours	Airco DH.4	No. 57 Squadron RAF	Achiet-le-Petit, France	
18	8 August 1918	0900 hours	Bristol F.2 Fighter	No. 48 Squadron RAF	Mericourt, France	
19	8 August 1918	1755 hours	Airco DH.9	No. 27 Squadron RAF	Ham	
20	12 August 1918	1215 hours	Sopwith Camel	No. 209 Squadron RAF		
21 and 22	19 August 1918	0805 hours	Bristol F.2 Fighter	No. 48 Squadron RAF	Lihons, France	
23	19 August 1918	0835 hours	Royal Aircraft Factory SE.5a	No. 56 Squadron RAF	Le Transloy, France	
24	3 September 1918	1840 hours	Bristol F.2 Fighter	No. 20 Squadron RAF	North of Bertincourt, France	
25	5 September 1918	1110 hours	Royal Aircraft Factory SE.5a	No. 64 Squadron RAF	Bugnicourt, France	
26	17 September 1918	1912 hours	Sopwith Camel		Southwest of Hermies, France	
27	21 September 1918	1840 hours	Airco DH.4	No. 205 Squadron RAF	Le Catelet, France	
28	24 September 1918	1730 hours	Airco DH.9	No. 49 Squadron RAF	South of Beauvois, France	
29	27 September 1918	1210 hours	Sopwith Camel	No. 54 Squadron RAF	Bertry, France	
30	29 September 1918	0850 hours	Bristol F.2 Fighter	No. 20 Squadron RAF	East of Caudry, France	Ace Nicholson Boulton KIA; C. H. Chase KIA
