= Ezekiel Caro =

German rabbi and historian (1844–1915)

Rabbi Dr. Ezekiel Caro

Personal life
- Born: 26 September 1844 Pinne, Grand Duchy of Posen
- Died: 24 December 1915 (aged 71) Wieden, Vienna, Austria-Hungary
- Buried: Vienna Central Cemetery
- Parent: Joseph Ḥayyim Caro (father)

Religious life
- Religion: Judaism
- Denomination: Reform Judaism

Ezekiel Caro (German: Jecheskel Caro, Hebrew: יחזקאל קרא; 26 September 1844 – 24 December 1915) was a German rabbi and historian.

== Biography ==
Caro was born in Pinne, Grand Duchy of Posen, in 1844. His father was the exegete and homiletic writer Joseph Ḥayyim Caro, rabbi at Włocławek, and his brother was historian Jacob Caro. He attended the gymnasium at Bromberg, the Jewish Theological Seminary, and the University of Breslau, where he studied philosophy and Oriental studies. Subsequently, he graduated as doctor of philosophy at the University of Heidelberg.

He was at first rabbi of the German-Jewish community of Lodz, Poland, and then at Mewe, western Prussia. He was afterwards successively rabbi at Dirschau (1870–79), Erfurt (1879–82), Pilsen (1881–91). In 1891 Caro became rabbi of the Tempel Synagogue in Lemberg, and became the city's chief progressive rabbi on 1 January 1898.

Caro's works include Ausgewählte Gelegenheitsreden (Danzig, 1874), Ein Vierteljahrhundert städtischer Verwaltung (Dirschau, 1880), Geschichte der Juden in Lemberg bis zur Theilung Polens (Cracow, 1894), as well as many sermons and essays in Moritz Rahmer's Jüdisches Litteratur-Blatt.

He left Lemberg for Vienna with the outbreak of World War I in 1914, dying there the following December.

== Publications ==
- Ausgewählte Gelegenheitsreden. Danzig: Druck und Verlag von A. W. Kafemann. 1874.
- Ein Vierteljahrhundert städtischer Verwaltung. Dirschau: Verlag und Druck von Conrad Hopp. 1880.
- Entwurf und Begründung eines Normalplans für den jüdischen Religionsunterricht in den öffentlichen höheren und niederen Lehranstalten. Erfurt: Verlag von Hugo Neumann. 1881.
- Geschichte der Juden in Lemberg bis zur Theilung Polens. Cracow: Druck von Josef Fischer. 1894. hdl:2027/hvd.32044055081848.
- Zum Gedächtnis an Salomon Buber: drei Reden. Lemberg: Verlag der Buber'schen Raschistiftung. 1907.
