= Koźle (disambiguation) =

Koźle is a district of the town of Kędzierzyn-Koźle, Opole Voivodeship (south-western Poland).

Koźle may also refer to:

- Koźle, Greater Poland Voivodeship (west-central Poland)
- Koźle, Łódź Voivodeship (central Poland)
