= Szczuczyn (disambiguation) =

Szczuczyn is a town in Podlaskie Voivodeship in north-eastern Poland.

Szczuczyn may also refer to:

- Szczuczyn, Greater Poland Voivodeship (west-central Poland)
- Szczuczyn Litewski, Polish name for Shchuchyn in modern Belarus
