= Otorowo, Greater Poland Voivodeship =

Otorowo
- Village
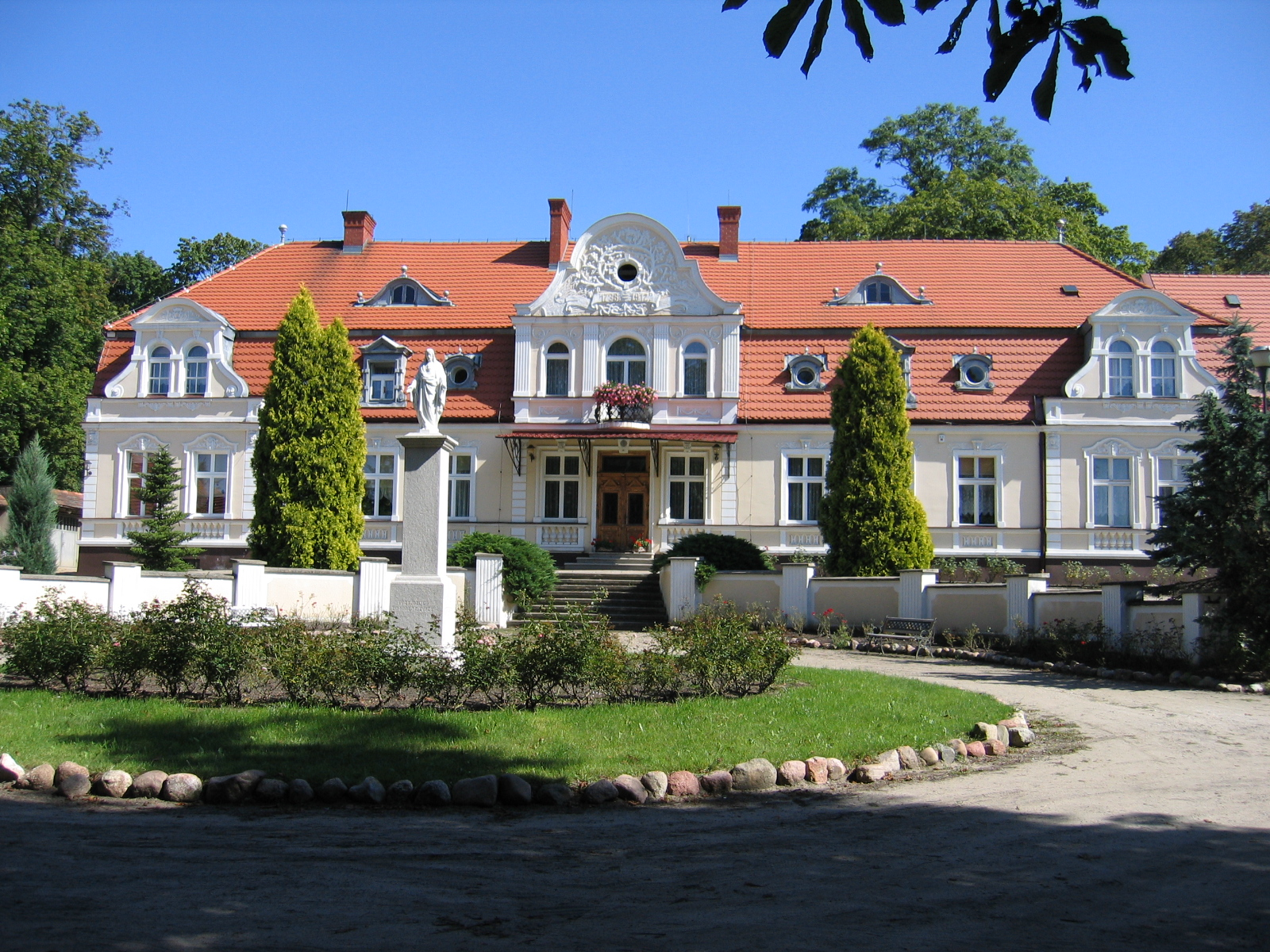
- Baroque Moszczeński Manor House in Otorowo

- Location within Poland
- Coordinates: 52°33′N 16°26′E
- Country: Poland
- Voivodeship: Greater Poland
- County: Szamotuły
- Gmina: Szamotuły
- First mentioned: 1284
- Population: 1,300
- Time zone: UTC+1 (CET)
  - Summer (DST): UTC+2 (CEST)
- Vehicle registration: PSZ
- Primary airport: Poznań–Ławica Airport

Otorowo [ɔtɔˈrɔvɔ] is a village in the administrative district of Gmina Szamotuły, within Szamotuły County, Greater Poland Voivodeship, in west-central Poland.

The landmarks of the village are the Gothic All Saints church and the Baroque Moszczeński Manor House which now houses an orphanage.

== History ==
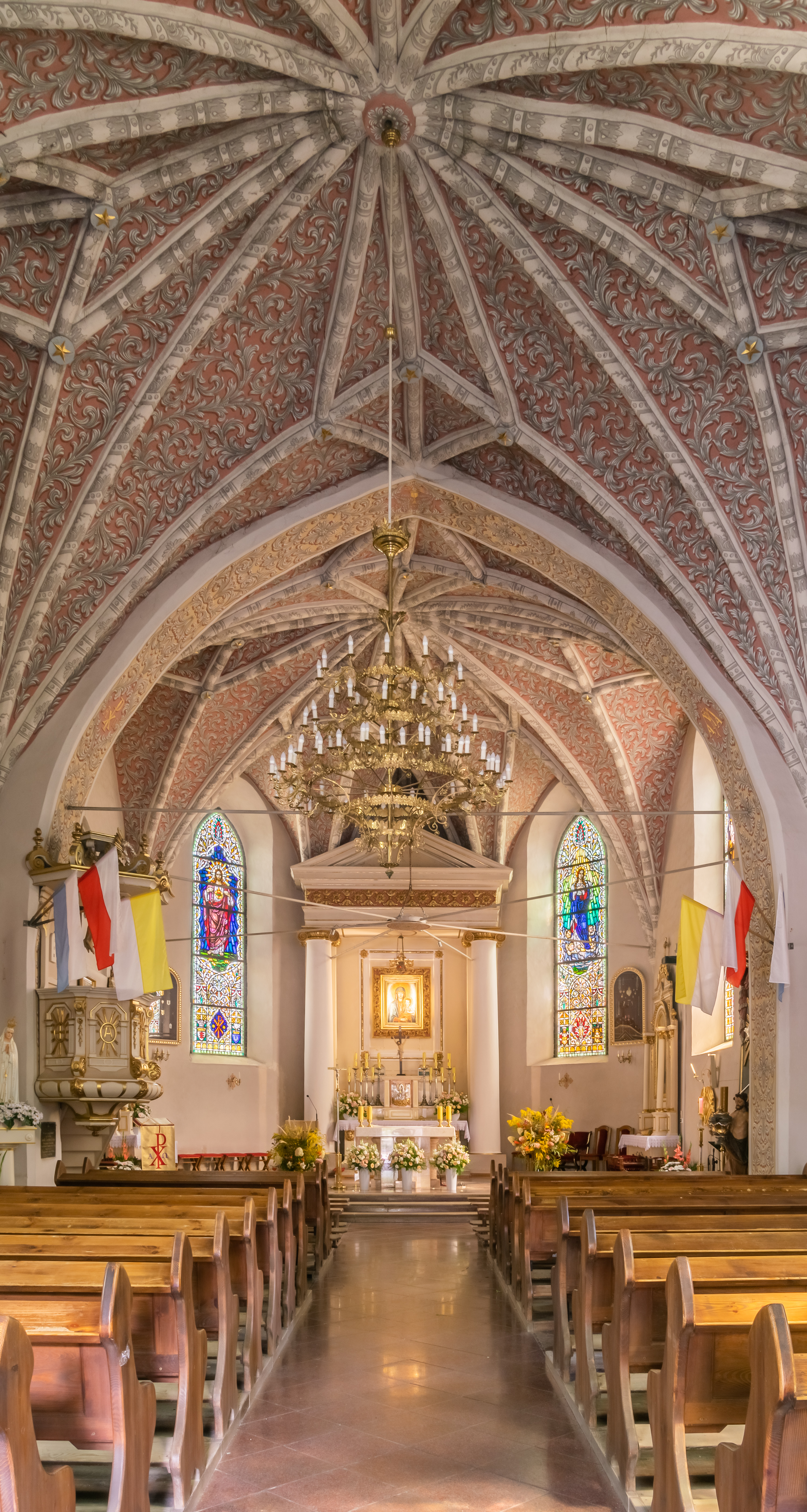
Interior of the Gothic All Saints church

The oldest known mention of the village comes from 1284. Otorowo was a private village of Polish nobility, administratively located in the Poznań County in the Poznań Voivodeship in the Greater Poland Province of the Polish Crown.

During the German occupation of Poland (World War II), the Germans carried out public executions of Polish farmers and craftsmen from Otorowo in Otorowo (on October 12–13, 1939) and in the nearby town of Szamotuły (on December 13, 1939). Poles from Otorowo were also among the victims of large massacres carried out by the Germans in November 1939 in nearby Mędzisko. The massacres were committed as part of the Intelligenzaktion. In late 1939, the Germans carried out expulsions of Poles, who were then held in Wronki, where they were searched and stripped of money and valuable items, and afterwards deported to the Radom District of the General Government (German-occupied central Poland). Later on, a German transit camp for Poles expelled from nearby villages was operated in the village. Two Poles from Otorowo, a pre-war school principal and a policeman, were murdered by the Russians in Katyn and Tver in April–May 1940 in the large Katyn massacre.

== Sports ==
The local football club is LZS Otorowo. It competes in the lower leagues.

== Notable people ==
- Zbigniew Ryndak (born 1935), Polish writer
- Władysław Komar (1940–1998), Polish shot putter, actor and cabaretist
