= Pniewy =

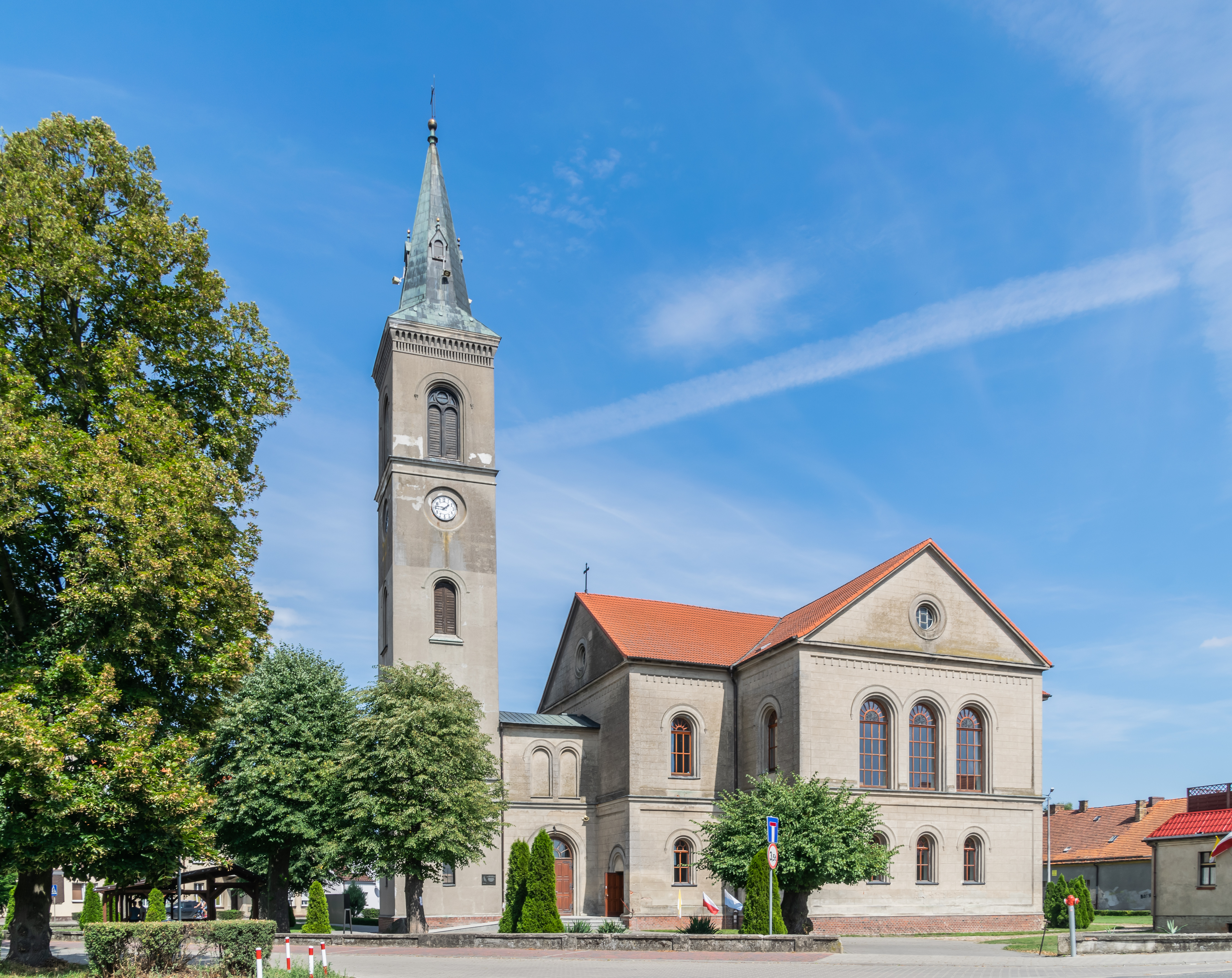
- Saint John the Baptist church in Pniewy

- Coat of arms

- Location within Poland
- Coordinates: 52°31′N 16°16′E
- Country: Poland
- Voivodeship: Greater Poland
- County: Szamotuły
- Gmina: Pniewy
- Founded: 12th century
- First mentioned: 1256

Area
  - Total: 9.21 km^{2} (3.56 sq mi)

Population (2020)
  - Total: 7,747
  - Density: 841/km^{2} (2,180/sq mi)
- Time zone: UTC+1 (CET)
  - Summer (DST): UTC+2 (CEST)
- Postal code: 62-045
- Vehicle registration: PSZ
- Website: http://www.pniewy.wlkp.pl

Pniewy ([ˈpɲɛvɨ]; German: Pinne) is a town in Szamotuły County, Greater Poland Voivodeship, Poland, with 7,747 inhabitants as of 2020. There is a lake and a beach with access to a playground, stage and a softball pitch.

== History ==
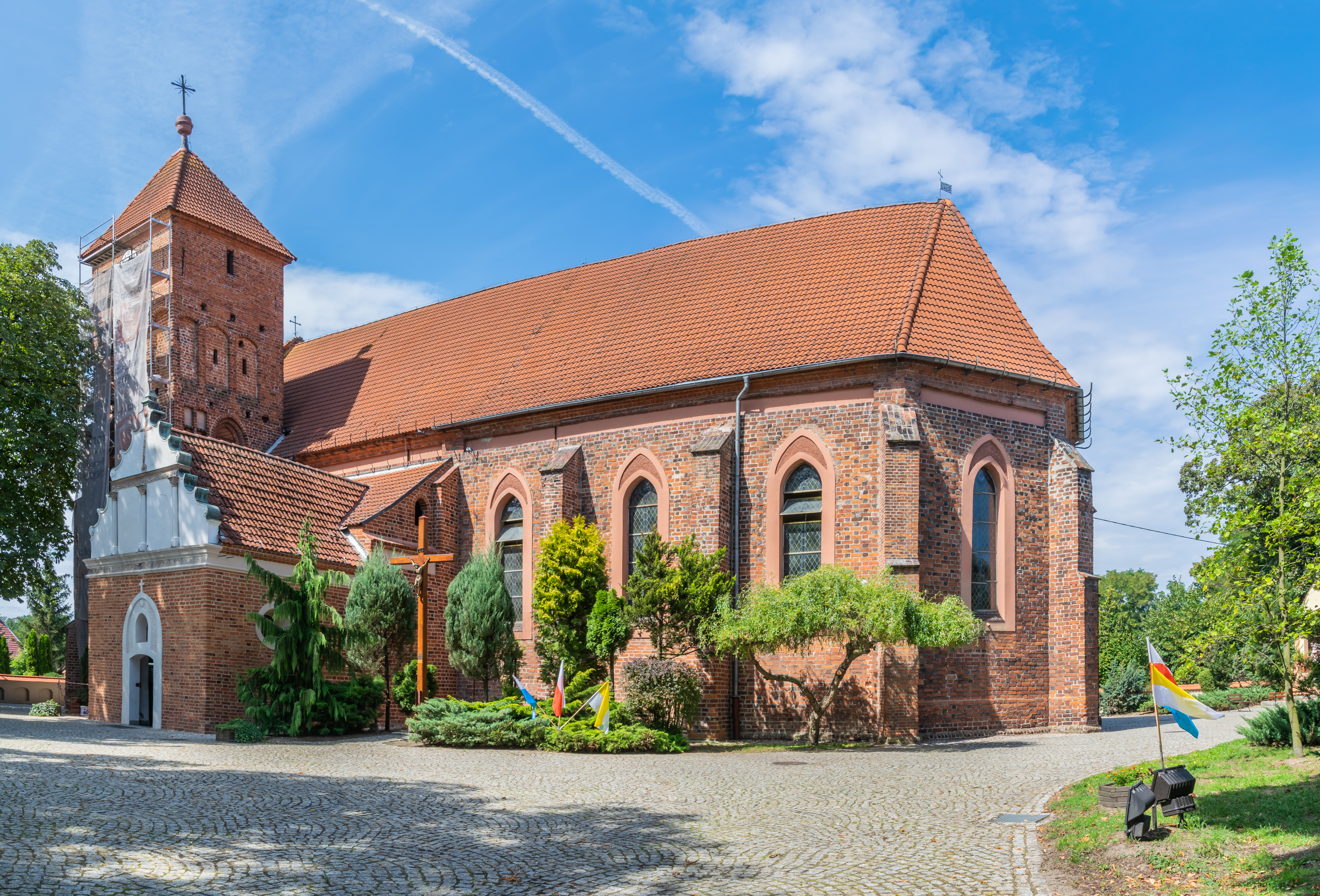
Gothic Saint Lawrence church during conservation works

Pniewy was founded in the 12th century as part of the Piast-ruled Kingdom of Poland, although a stronghold also existed at the site earlier. The oldest known mention of Pniewy comes from 1256, and town rights were probably granted in the late 13th century. Pniewy's name probably comes from the Polish word pień, which means "trunk", which is also depicted in the town's coat of arms. Pniewy was a private town held by various Polish noble families, the first of which was the Nałęcz family, later known as the Pniewski family of Nałęcz coat of arms. Administratively it was located in the Poznań Voivodeship in the Greater Poland Province of the Kingdom of Poland. The town suffered during the 17th and 18th century wars, however it was revived thanks to the Szołdryscy family, and local guilds were granted several privileges.

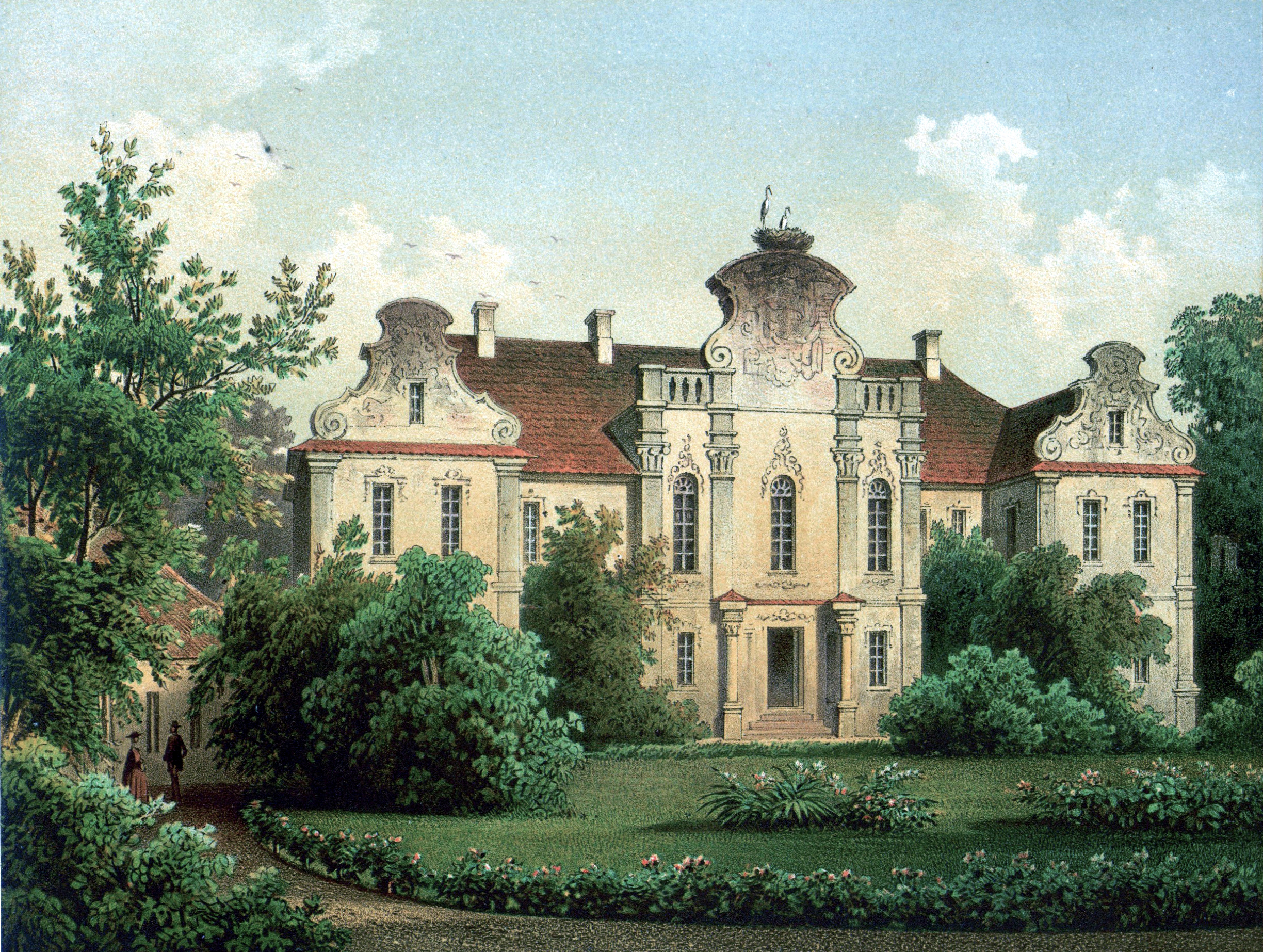
19th-century view of the local palace

In 1793 it was annexed by Prussia in the Second Partition of Poland. Following the successful Greater Poland uprising of 1806, it was regained by Poles and included within the short-lived Duchy of Warsaw. After its dissolution, in 1815, it was re-annexed by Prussia, and from 1871 to 1918 was also part of Germany. The population took part in Polish uprisings of 1830–1831 and 1848. The town was subjected to anti-Polish policies including Germanisation, however it remained a center of Polish resistance, and Poles established various organizations. 707 Jews lived in Pniewy in 1837, and 225 in 1910. In November 1918, after World War I, Poland regained independence, and in December 1918, local Poles liberated the town from the Germans, and it was re-integrated with Poland. Local Poles took part in multiple battles of the Greater Poland uprising (1918–19), in which 18 of them were killed. In the 1920s Polish nun Ursula Ledóchowska, today considered a saint of the Catholic Church, founded the Congregation of the Ursulines of the Agonizing Heart of Jesus in Pniewy.

Following the joint German-Soviet invasion of Poland, which started World War II in September 1939, the town was occupied by Germany. During the German occupation, the Polish population was subjected to expulsions, confiscation of property, deportations to concentration camps and to forced labour, and executions. In November and December 1939, inhabitants of Pniewy were among Poles murdered in mass executions in Mędzisko and Szamotuły. The Polish resistance was active in the town. Ignacy Hulka, commander of the Lwówek-Pniewy unit of the Union of Armed Struggle, was arrested by the Gestapo on 14 October 1942 and subjected to brutal interrogations during which he died a week later.

== Demographics ==
Historical population

Year	Pop.	±%
1871	2,328	—
1880	2,374	+2.0%
1890	2,381	+0.3%
1900	2,570	+7.9%
1910	2,953	+14.9%
1921	2,731	−7.5%

Year	Pop.	±%
1931	3,371	+23.4%
1939	4,000	+18.7%
1950	3,366	−15.8%
1960	4,085	+21.4%
2010	7,829	+91.7%

== Sports ==
The local football club is Sokół Pniewy. It competes in the lower leagues, but in the 1990s it played in Poland's top division.

== Education ==
There are two schools located in the town of Pniewy. The primary school of Powstańców Wielkopolskich and an upper-secondary school complex (high school and upper vocational school) Zespół Szkół im. Emilii Sczanieckiej.

== Business ==
There are local and international companies operating in Pniewy and the Municipality of Pniewy.

Postęp Sp. z.o.o. company hires about 200 employees. It manufactures furniture for IKEA company.

== Twin cities- sister cities ==
Pniewy signed legal agreements for partnerships with municipalities. Halluin (France), Lübbenau and Oer - Erkenschwick (Germany), North - Tyneside (The UK), Kocevje (Slovenia), Radków and Kościerzyna (Poland).

== Notable people ==
- Ezekiel Caro, rabbi
- Joseph Chayyim Caro, rabbi, called to the rabbinate of this town
- Gustav Gottheil, American rabbi
- Ursula Ledóchowska and Lawrence Wnuk, Polish Catholic clergy, buried in this city
- Adolf Lewin, German rabbi and author
- Josef Tal, composer
