= Josef Mai =

German fighter pilot

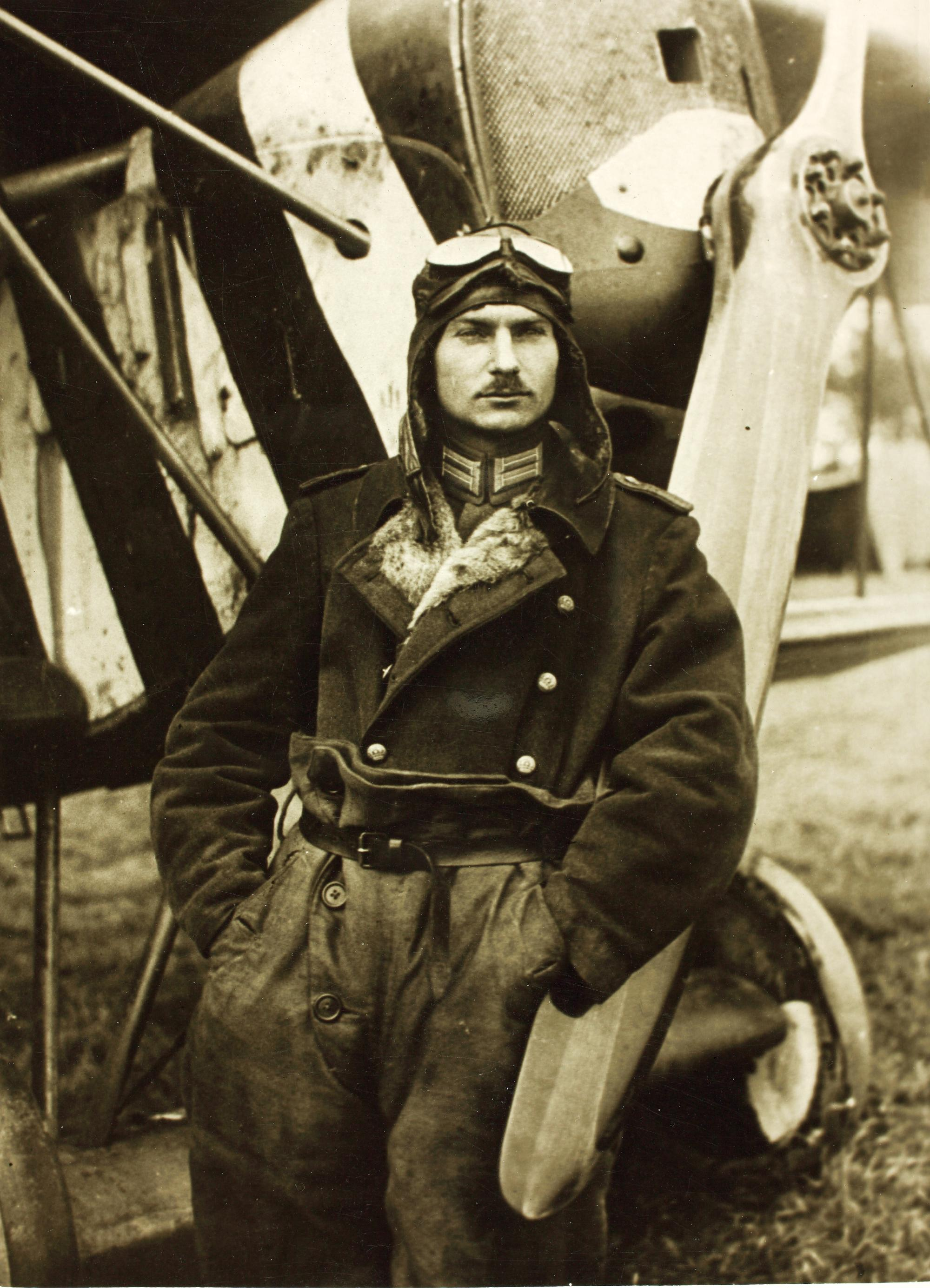
- Born: 3 March 1887; Ottorowo, Province of Posen, Kingdom of Prussia, German Empire
- Died: 18 January 1982 (aged 94); Germany
- Military career
- Allegiance: German Empire
- Branch: Air Service
- Service years: 1915–1918
- Rank: Major
- Unit: Kasta 29, Jagdstaffel 5
- Conflicts: Verdun, Somme
- Awards: Iron Cross First and Second Class
- Other work: World War II service

Major Josef Mai (3 March 1887 – 18 January 1982) Iron Cross First and Second Class, was a World War I fighter pilot credited with 30 victories.

== Early life ==
Josef Mai was born in Ottorowo, Province of Posen. His original military service began on 3 October 1907 with the 10th Lancers. When World War I began Mai was part of the offensive aimed at the French capital of Paris. He later took part in the fighting around Warsaw, Poland. In 1915 he campaigned along the Dniester River. He also served at the battles of Verdun and the Somme.

== Aerial service ==
Mai joined the German air service in 1915; he trained at the Fokker plant at Leipzig. He earned his pilot's brevet on 28 July 1916, and flew reconnaissance aircraft for Kasta 29. He then underwent fighter training and joined Jagdstaffel 5 in March 1917. As a Vizefeldwebel, he was one of three non-commissioned pilots (along with Fritz Rumey and Otto Koennecke) who flew together so successfully they ended up claiming 40% of the Jasta's victories between them, and making Jasta 5 the third highest scoring unit of the war. The trio was nicknamed "The Golden Triumvirate".

Mai scored his first victory on 20 August 1917, flying an Albatros D.V, and downing a Sopwith Camel of No. 70 Squadron. His fifth victory, over a RAF SE.5a, was on 30 November.

Mai did not score again until 13 January 1918. On 25 April 1918 he forced down British ace Lt Maurice Newnham of No. 65 Squadron, for his tenth victory.

By May 1918 Jasta 5 was sharing an airstrip with Jagdgeschwader 1, and as the "Flying Circus" re-equipped with new Fokker D.VIIs, Mai started flying a cast-off Fokker Dr.I triplane. He flew this triplane (Serial No. 139/17) for his next victory, over a pair of aces in a No. 11 Squadron Bristol F.2B. Pilot Lt Herbert Sellars was killed although Observer Lt. Charles Robson survived and taken prisoner. He claimed three victories with the Triplane.

Mai was prone to paint his planes in a "zebra stripe" pattern, with black and white striping on the fuselage angled to the left viewed from the starboard side. his theory being the optical illusion would help to throw off an enemy pilot's aim. Painted on this background was his insignia of a star and crescent. His Albatros and D.VII were known to bear this paint scheme although his Dr.l paint scheme is uncertain.

On 19 August 1918 he had his most successful day. He attacked two Bristol F.2B fighters from No. 48 Squadron, Royal Air Force. As he hit one Brisfit with incendiary ammunition, the other swerved away from the incoming fire and collided with his wrecked companion. Mai followed up this double kill by downing a 56 Squadron SE.5a later.

On 3 September he was wounded in action in the left thigh. Nevertheless, he scored again two days later, and added five more victories during September.

Mai's 26th victory was a No. 64 Squadron SE5a on 5 September 1918. On 27 September 1918, the day of his 29th success, Mai was promoted to Leutnant. His friend Fritz Rumey was also killed in action on that day.

Mai claimed his 30th and last score, a Bristol F.2B of 20 Squadron, killing the ace crew of Lt. Nicholson Boulton and 2/Lt. C.H. Chase on 29 September 1918. 15 had been claimed with the Fokker D.VII, 12 with the Albatros and 3 with the Fokker Dr.I.

Mai was nominated for Germany's highest honor, the Pour le Merite, or Blue Max. Before it could be approved the war ended with Germany's loss.

== Postwar life ==
Mai is believed to have become a flying instructor for the Luftwaffe during World War II. He died at the age of 94 in January 1982.

== Bibliography ==
- Franks, Norman, et al. (2004) Fokker D VII Aces of World War I: Part 2. Osprey Publishing. ISBN 1-84176-729-8, ISBN 978-1-84176-729-1.
- Franks, Norman, et al. (2001) Fokker Dr I Aces of World War I. Osprey Publishing. ISBN 1-84176-223-7, ISBN 978-1-84176-223-4.
- Franks, Norman. (2000)Albatros Aces of World War I. Osprey Publishing. ISBN 1-85532-960-3, ISBN 978-1-85532-960-7.
- Franks, Norman, et al. (2008). Above the Lines: A Complete Record of the Fighter Aces of the German Air Service, Naval Air Service and Flanders Marine Corps, 1914-1918. ISBN 0-94881-773-9 ISBN 978-0-94881-773-1
