= Rudnik, Greater Poland Voivodeship =

Rudnik
- Village
- Location within Poland
- Coordinates: 52°33′41″N 16°39′11″E
- Country: Poland
- Voivodeship: Greater Poland
- County: Szamotuły
- Gmina: Szamotuły

Rudnik (Polish pronunciation: [ˈrudɲik]) is a village in the administrative district of Gmina Szamotuły, within Szamotuły County, Greater Poland Voivodeship, in west-central Poland.
