= Ludwikowo, Szamotuły County =

Ludwikowo
- Settlement
- Location within Poland
- Coordinates: 52°37′38″N 16°37′2″E
- Country: Poland
- Voivodeship: Greater Poland
- County: Szamotuły
- Gmina: Szamotuły

Ludwikowo [ludviˈkɔvɔ] is a settlement in the administrative district of Gmina Szamotuły, within Szamotuły County, Greater Poland Voivodeship, in west-central Poland.
