= Jastrowo =

- Village
- Location within Poland
- Coordinates: 52°36′N 16°31′E
- Country: Poland
- Voivodeship: Greater Poland
- County: Szamotuły
- Gmina: Szamotuły

Jastrowo [jasˈtrɔvɔ] is a village in the administrative district of Gmina Szamotuły, within Szamotuły County, Greater Poland Voivodeship, in west-central Poland.
