= Baborowo =

- Village
- Location within Poland
- Coordinates: 52°35′N 16°39′E
- Country: Poland
- Voivodeship: Greater Poland
- County: Szamotuły
- Gmina: Szamotuły
- Population: 250

Baborowo [babɔˈrɔvɔ] is a village in the administrative district of Gmina Szamotuły, within Szamotuły County, Greater Poland Voivodeship, in west-central Poland.

== History ==
From 1975 to 1998, Baborowo was administratively part of the Poznań Voivodeship. In 1999, following Poland's administrative reorganisation, the village became part of the Greater Poland Voivodeship.

Baborowo had a population of 223 in 2009.
