= Adolf Lewin =

German rabbi and author (1843–1910)

Adolf Lewin was a German rabbi and author. He was born in Pinne, Grand Duchy of Posen on 23 September 1843. Lewin was educated at the Jewish Theological Seminary and at the University of Breslau. In 1872 he was appointed rabbi in Koźmin, later in Coblenz, and in 1886 was called to the rabbinate of Freiburg im Breisgau. He died in 1910.

== Publications ==
- "Die Religionsdisputation R. Jehiels", a prize essay (Breslau, 1869);
- "Die Makkabäische Erhebung", a dissertation (ib. 1870);
- "Zur Judenfrage: Naturwissenschaft oder Judenhass" (ib. 1880);
- "Der Judenspiegel des Dr. Justus, ins Licht der Wahrheit gerückt", Magdeburg 1884
- "Juden in Freiburg-im-Breisgau" (Treves, 1890);
- "Das Judenthum und die Nichtjuden" (ib. 1891);
- "Geschichte, Geographie, und Reiselitteratur der Juden" (in Winter and Wünsche, "Die Jüdische Litteratur", ii. 287–473).
