= Mątowo =

Mutowo
- Village
- Location within Poland
- Coordinates: 52°37′58.8″N 16°35′59.7″E
- Country: Poland
- Voivodeship: Greater Poland
- County: Szamotuły
- Gmina: Szamotuły
- Population: 514

Mutowo [mutɔvɔ] is a village in the administrative district of Gmina Szamotuły, within Szamotuły County, Greater Poland Voivodeship, in west-central Poland.
