= Poświętne, Szamotuły County =

Poświętne
- Settlement
- Location within Poland
- Coordinates: 52°33′51″N 16°24′44″E
- Country: Poland
- Voivodeship: Greater Poland
- County: Szamotuły
- Gmina: Szamotuły

Poświętne [pɔɕˈfjɛntnɛ] is a settlement in the administrative district of Gmina Szamotuły, within Szamotuły County, Greater Poland Voivodeship, in west-central Poland.
