= Twardowo, Szamotuły County =

Twardowo
- Village
- Location within Poland
- Coordinates: 52°39′14″N 16°35′7″E
- Country: Poland
- Voivodeship: Greater Poland
- County: Szamotuły
- Gmina: Szamotuły

Twardowo [tfarˈdɔvɔ] is a village in the administrative district of Gmina Szamotuły, within Szamotuły County, Greater Poland Voivodeship, in west-central Poland.
