= Czyściec, Greater Poland Voivodeship =

Czyściec
- Village
- Location within Poland
- Coordinates: 52°32′57″N 16°28′57″E
- Country: Poland
- Voivodeship: Greater Poland
- County: Szamotuły
- Gmina: Szamotuły
- Population: 40

Czyściec [ˈt͡ʂɨɕt͡ɕɛt͡s] is a village in the administrative district of Gmina Szamotuły, within Szamotuły County, Greater Poland Voivodeship, in west-central Poland.
