= Charles Robson (RAF officer) =

- Born: Charles Crichton Robson; 1895; Edinburgh, Scotland
- Died: 3 January 1958 (aged 62–63); Edinburgh, Scotland
- Military career
- Allegiance: United Kingdom
- Branch: British Army; Royal Air Force
- Rank: Lieutenant
- Units: Royal Scots; No. 11 Squadron RFC/RAF
- Conflicts: World War I • Western Front
- Awards: Military Cross

Lieutenant Charles Crichton Robson MC (1895 – 3 January 1958) was a Scottish World War I observer ace credited with eight aerial victories.

== Military service ==
Robson was born in Edinburgh, Scotland, the son of Charles and Maggie Robson. He enlisted into the 9th Battalion, The Royal Scots (Lothian Regiment), as a private, and served in France from 24 February 1915. On 6 August 1915 Robson was commissioned as a second lieutenant in the 14th (Reserve) Battalion, Royal Scots, but on 4 September transferred from the Reserves to a service battalion, the 12th Royal Scots.

On 1 July 1917, Robson was promoted to lieutenant, and on 19 December was transferred to Royal Flying Corps and appointed a flying officer (observer), with seniority from 21 November.

Robson was posted to No. 11 Squadron, and teamed with pilot Lieutenant Herbert Sellars, flying a Bristol F.2b two-seater fighter. He gained his first aerial victory on 12 March 1918, shooting down in flames a LVG C.VI, and over the following six days drove down out of control three Albatros D.Vs. On 21 March he accounted for two more Albatros aircraft, the second being that of Leutnant Ludwig Hanstein, the Staffelführer of Jagdstaffel 35, who was killed. On 2 April 1918, the day after the Royal Flying Corps and the Royal Naval Air Service were merged to form the Royal Air Force, Robson drove down a Fokker Dr.I. His eighth and final victory came on 15 May, sharing in the driving down another Dr.I. However, shortly afterwards his aircraft was shot down by Vizefeldwebel Josef Mai of Jagdstaffel 5. Sellars was killed in the crash. Robson survived, but was taken prisoner.

Robson's award of the Military Cross was gazetted on 21 June 1918. His citation read:

Temporary Lieutenant Charles Crichton Robson, Royal Flying Corps.

"For conspicuous gallantry and devotion to duty. He completed a long-distance reconnaissance under very trying weather conditions, and succeeded in returning with the most valuable information. He has shown himself to be very cool and resourceful under all circumstances."

== Later life ==
Robson attended the University of Edinburgh Medical School. He died in 1958 in Edinburgh.
