= Ludwig Hanstein =

Prussian flying ace

- Born: 20 January 1892; Sudwalde, Kingdom of Prussia, German Empire
- Died: 21 March 1918 (aged 26) near Morchies, France
- Military career
- Allegiance: German Empire
- Branch: Aviation
- Rank: Leutnant
- Units: Flieger-Abteilung 9; Jagdstaffel 16, Jagdstaffel 35
- Commands: Jagdstaffel 35
- Awards: House Order of Hohenzollern; Bavaria's Military Merit Cross Fourth Class with Swords; also with Crowns and Swords

Leutnant Ludwig Hanstein (20 January 1892 – 21 March 1918) HOH, Bavaria's MMO was a World War I flying ace credited with 16 aerial victories.

Hanstein rose through the enlisted ranks to become a Leutnant in command of a fighter squadron. Rather unusually, this Prussian usually served in Bavarian units; he rose to command of Royal Bavarian Jagdstaffel 35. After shooting down 16 enemy aircraft, including three observation balloons, Hanstein was killed in aerial combat on 21 March 1918.

== Early life and service ==
Ludwig Hanstein was born on 20 January 1892 in Sudwalde, Kingdom of Prussia, German Empire. His life and military service are unknown until he began aviation service in early 1916. In May 1916, he was posted to a Bavarian unit, Flieger-Abteilung (Flier Detachment) 9. While repelling a British strategic bombing raid on 12 October 1916, he used a Fokker D.II fighter plane to force down a RNAS Sopwith 1½ Strutter onto Freiburg Airfield by wounding its pilot through the neck.

== Jagdstaffel 16 service ==
Taking a transfer as a Vizefeldwebel on 31 October 1916, Hanstein shifted to Royal Bavarian Jagdstaffel 16, whose theater of operations was generally the French sector of the Western Front. Hanstein scored again on 17 March 1917; by 25 September, he had added nine more to his tally to become Jasta 16's first ace. On that same day, having been commissioned a Leutnant, he was posted to command of Jagdstaffel 35.

== Jagdstaffel 35 service: killed in action ==
On 17 October 1917, Hanstein received Bavaria's Military Merit Order Fourth Class with Swords. Hanstein scored his thirteenth victory on 12 November 1917 and scored twice more in January 1918. On 20 January 1918, he received the Knight's Cross with Swords of the House Order of Hohenzollern. He also temporarily relinquished command to Bruno Justinius on 20 January and went on leave. On 14 February 1918, while on leave, Hanstein received an award of the Military Merit Order, this time with Crown and Swords. He succeeded again to the command of the jasta on 4 March 1918, after Justinius was killed in action and his successor transferred. About ten minutes after scoring his final victory on 21 March 1918, Hanstein was killed in action by Herbert Sellars and his aerial observer Charles C. Robson. Sellars' combat report stated, "I did a sharp turn to the left, my observer firing at 75 yards range into the nearest enemy aircraft, which burst into flames and was seen to crash north of Morchies.
