= Emilianowo, Greater Poland Voivodeship =

Emilianowo
- Village
- Location within Poland
- Coordinates: 52°34′14″N 16°32′41″E
- Country: Poland
- Voivodeship: Greater Poland
- County: Szamotuły
- Gmina: Szamotuły

Emilianowo [ɛmiljaˈnɔvɔ] is a village in the administrative district of Gmina Szamotuły, within Szamotuły County, Greater Poland Voivodeship, in west-central Poland.
