= Jagdstaffel 35 =

Jasta 35
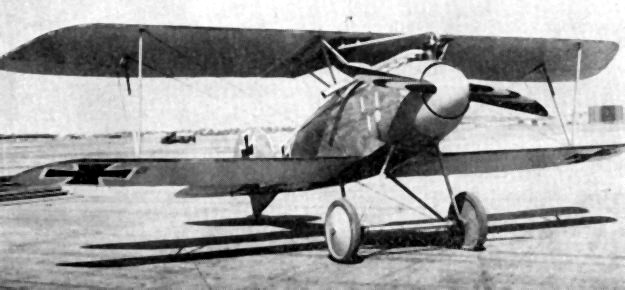
- Albatross D.III fighters were used by Jasta 35.
- Active: 1916–1918
- Country: German Empire
- Branch: Luftstreitkräfte
- Type: Fighter squadron
- Engagements: World War I

Royal Bavarian Jagdstaffel 35 was a World War I "hunting group" (i.e., fighter squadron) of the Luftstreitkräfte, the air arm of the Imperial German Army during World War I. The unit would score 44 aerial victories during the war, at the expense of six killed in action, four killed in flying accidents, nine wounded in action, five injured in flying accidents, and two taken prisoner of war.

== History ==
Royal Bavarian Jagdstaffel 35 was established at the FEA 6 training center on 14 December 1916. It became operational by 1 March 1917. It achieved its first victory on the same day it lost its first Staffelführer, 14 April 1917. After the death in combat of its second CO, subsequent leaders were brought in from outside, Hanstein from Jasta 16 and both Fuchs and Stark from Jasta 77. The squadron disbanded ten days after war's end, on 21 November 1918, at FEA 1 at Schleissheim.

== Commanding officers (Staffelführer) ==
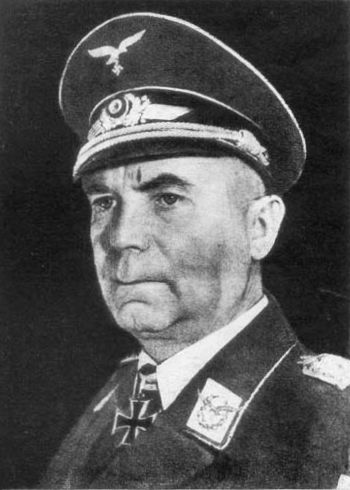
Generaloberst Otto Dessloch during World War II.

1. Herbert Theurich: 4 March 1917 – 14 April 1917 (KIA)
2. Otto Dessloch: 15 April 1917 – 29 June 1917
3. Otto Deindl: 29 June 1917 – 21 July 1917
4. Otto Dessloch: 22 July 1917 – 24 September 1917
5. Ludwig Hanstein: 24 September 1917- 20 January 1918
6. Bruno Justinius: 20 January 1918 – 30 January 1918 (KIA)
7. Franz Diemer: 30 January 1918 – 4 March 1918
8. Ludwig Hanstein: 4 March 1918 – 21 March 1918 (KIA)
9. Franz Diemer: 21 March 1918 – 21 April 1918
10. Otto Fuchs: 21 April 1918 – 7 July 1918
11. Rudolf Stark: 7 July 1918 – 28 July 1918
12. Gratz: 28 July 1918 – 8 August 1918
13. Rudolf Stark: 8 August 1918 – 11 November 1918

== Duty stations (airfields) ==
1. Grossenhain, Germany: 7 January 1917 – 1 March 1917
2. Colmar Nord: 4 March 1917 – 12 April 1917
3. Ensisheim, Germany: 12 April 1917 – 7 May 1917
4. Habsheim, Germany: 7 May 1917 – 21 July 1917
5. Ichteghem-Vyver: 21 July 1917 – 18 September 1917
6. Aertrycke: 18 September 1917 – 30 November 1917
7. Prémont, France: 30 November 1917 – 7 February 1918
8. Émerchicourt, France: 7 February 1918 – 28 March 1918
9. Favreuil, Bapaume: 28 March 1918 – 18 April 1918
10. Cambrai – Épinoy Air Base: 18 April 1918 – 28 August 1918
11. Lieu-Saint-Amand: 28 August 1918 – 29 September 1918
12. Bühl, Saarburg, Germany: 29 September 1918 – 12 October 1918
13. Givry, Mons: 12 October 1918 – 29 October 1918
14. Gosselies, Charleroi, Belgium: 29 October 1918 – 11 November 1918

== Personnel ==
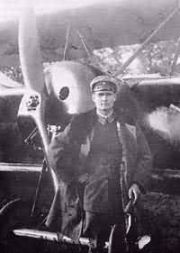
Rudolf Hess as a Pilot 1918

The squadron had three notable aces serve with it. Rudolf Stark was a winner of the Iron Cross; Ludwig Hanstein won the Royal House Order of Hohenzollern. Fritz Anders also won the Iron Cross. Hitler Deputy Fuhrer Rudolf Hess trained as a pilot and was assigned October 14, 1918 to Jagdstaffel 35 but did not see any action before the end of the war 11 November 1918.

== Aircraft and operations ==
=== Aircraft ===
The new squadron apparently began with new Albatros D.IIIs Later, it must have had at least one Albatros D.V, as Staffelführer Hanstein was flying one when he was killed.

In 1918, the unit upgraded to Fokker D.VIIs, some Pfalz D.XIIs, and some LFG Roland D.VIs.

=== Operations ===
Jasta 35 entered its military service on the Armee-Abteilung B Sector in March 1917, and operated there until July. It then transitioned to support of 4th Armee. It stayed with 4th Armee until December; during this time, it became part of Otto Schmidt's Jagdgruppe II along with Jasta 5, Jasta 37, and Jasta 46. In March 1918, Jasta 35 transferred into Jagdgruppe 8 under Eduard Ritter von Schleich, joining Jasta 23, Jasta 32, and Jasta 59; this meant it also transferred to support of 17th Armee. It remained in that support role until September 1918. When Jasta 59 moved out of JG 8 and Jasta 34 moved in, the new Royal Bavarian Jagdgeschwader IV was established; Jasta 35 ended its war with this new unit.

== Bibliography ==
- Nesbit, Roy Conyers; van Acker, Georges (2011) [1999]. The Flight of Rudolf Hess: Myths and Reality. Stroud: History Press. ISBN 978-0-7509-4757-2.
- Franks, Norman; Bailey, Frank W. & Guest, Russell F. (1993). Above The Lines: The Aces and Fighter Units of the German Air Service, Naval Air Service, and Flanders Marine Corps, 1914-1918. London, UK: Grub Street. ISBN 978-0-948817-73-1.
