= Wincentowo, Szamotuły County =

Wincentowo
- Village
- Location within Poland
- Coordinates: 52°32′50″N 16°26′47″E
- Country: Poland
- Voivodeship: Greater Poland
- County: Szamotuły
- Gmina: Szamotuły

Wincentowo [vint͡sɛnˈtɔvɔ] is a village in the administrative district of Gmina Szamotuły, within Szamotuły County, Greater Poland Voivodeship, in west-central Poland.
