= Jastrowo-Majątek =

- Settlement
- Location within Poland
- Coordinates: 52°36′35″N 16°31′40″E
- Country: Poland
- Voivodeship: Greater Poland
- County: Szamotuły
- Gmina: Szamotuły

Jastrowo-Majątek [jasˈtrɔvɔ maˈjɔntɛk] is a settlement in the administrative district of Gmina Szamotuły, within Szamotuły County, Greater Poland Voivodeship, in west-central Poland.
