= Przecławek =

- Settlement
- Location within Poland
- Coordinates: 52°32′11″N 16°42′18″E
- Country: Poland
- Voivodeship: Greater Poland
- County: Szamotuły
- Gmina: Szamotuły

Przecławek [pʂɛt͡sˈwavɛk] is a settlement in the administrative district of Gmina Szamotuły, within Szamotuły County, Greater Poland Voivodeship, in west-central Poland.
