= Piaskowo, Gmina Szamotuły =

Piaskowo
- Village
- Location within Poland
- Coordinates: 52°35′11″N 16°35′58″E
- Country: Poland
- Voivodeship: Greater Poland
- County: Szamotuły
- Gmina: Szamotuły

Piaskowo [pjasˈkɔvɔ] is a village in the administrative district of Gmina Szamotuły, within Szamotuły County, Greater Poland Voivodeship, in west-central Poland.
