= Ostrolesie =

- Village
- Location within Poland
- Coordinates: 52°35′19″N 16°30′49″E
- Country: Poland
- Voivodeship: Greater Poland
- County: Szamotuły
- Gmina: Szamotuły

Ostrolesie [ɔstrɔˈlɛɕɛ] is a village in the administrative district of Gmina Szamotuły, within Szamotuły County, Greater Poland Voivodeship, in west-central Poland.
