= Gmina Szamotuły =

Gmina Szamotuły Szamotuły Commune
- Gmina
- Flag Coat of arms
- Interactive map of Gmina Szamotuły
- Coordinates (Szamotuły): 52°36′N 16°35′E
- Country: Poland
- Voivodeship: Greater Poland
- County: Szamotuły
- Seat: Szamotuły

Area
  - Total: 175.07 km^{2} (67.59 sq mi)

Population (2006)
  - Total: 28,575
  - Density: 163.22/km^{2} (422.74/sq mi)
  - Urban: 18,760
  - Rural: 9,815
- Website: http://www.szamotuly.pl

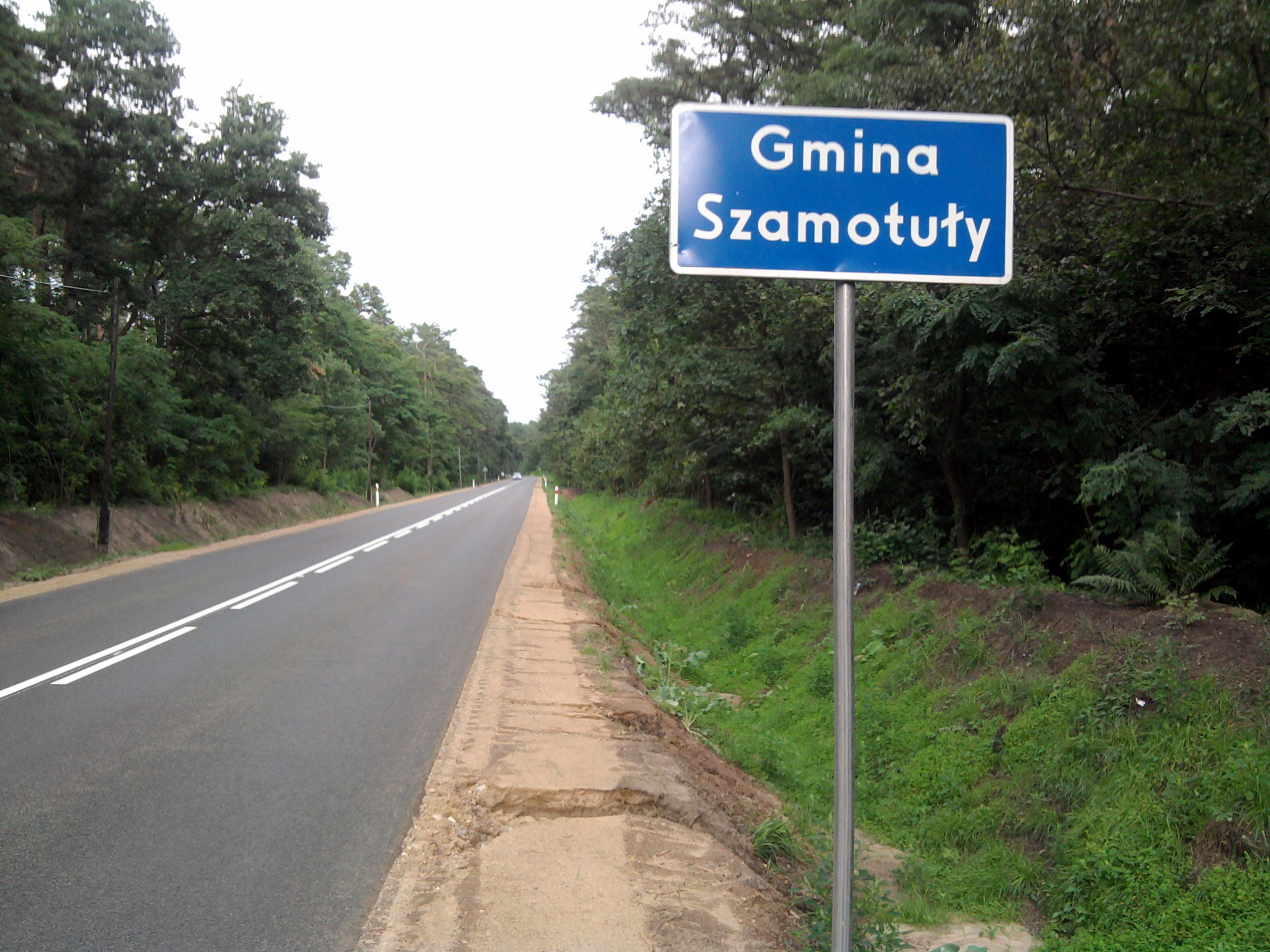
Tablica Gmina Szamotuły

Gmina Szamotuły is an urban-rural gmina (administrative district) in Szamotuły County, Greater Poland Voivodeship, in west-central Poland. Its seat is the town of Szamotuły, which lies approximately 32 kilometres (20 mi) north-west of the regional capital Poznań.

The gmina covers an area of 175.07 square kilometres (67.6 sq mi), and as of 2006 its total population is 28,575 (out of which the population of Szamotuły amounts to 18,760, and the population of the rural part of the gmina is 9,815).

== Villages ==
Apart from the town of Szamotuły, Gmina Szamotuły contains the villages and settlements of Baborówko, Baborowo, Brodziszewo, Czyściec, Emilianowo, Gałowo, Gałowo-Majątek, Gąsawy, Grabowiec, Jastrowo, Jastrowo-Majątek, Kamionka, Kąsinowo, Kępa, Koźle, Krzeszkowice, Lipnica, Lipnickie Huby, Ludwikowo, Lulinek, Mątowo, Mielno, Myszkowo, Nowy Folwark, Ostrolesie, Otorowo, Pamiątkowo, Piaskowo, Piotrkówko, Poświętne, Przecław, Przecławek, Przyborówko, Przyborowo, Rudnik, Śmiłowo, Szczuczyn, Twardowo, Wincentowo, Witoldzin and Żalewo.

== Neighbouring gminas ==
Gmina Szamotuły is bordered by the gminas of Kaźmierz, Oborniki, Obrzycko, Ostroróg, Pniewy and Rokietnica.
