= Kamionka, Szamotuły County =

Kamionka
- Village
- Location within Poland
- Coordinates: 52°33′23″N 16°27′23″E
- Country: Poland
- Voivodeship: Greater Poland
- County: Szamotuły
- Gmina: Szamotuły

Kamionka [kaˈmjɔnka] is a village in the administrative district of Gmina Szamotuły, located within Szamotuły County in the Greater Poland Voivodeship of west-central Poland.
