= Rudolf Stark =

- Born: 11 February 1897, Neuburg an der Donau
- Died: 1982
- Military career
- Allegiance: Kingdom of Bavaria; German Empire
- Branch: Cavalry; aviation
- Rank: Leutnant
- Unit: FAA 296, Jasta 34
- Commands: Jasta 77, Jasta 35
- Awards: Iron Cross First and Second Class, Military Merit Order

Lieutenant Rudolf Stark (11 February 1897 – after 1933) was a World War I flying ace credited with eleven confirmed and five unconfirmed aerial victories.

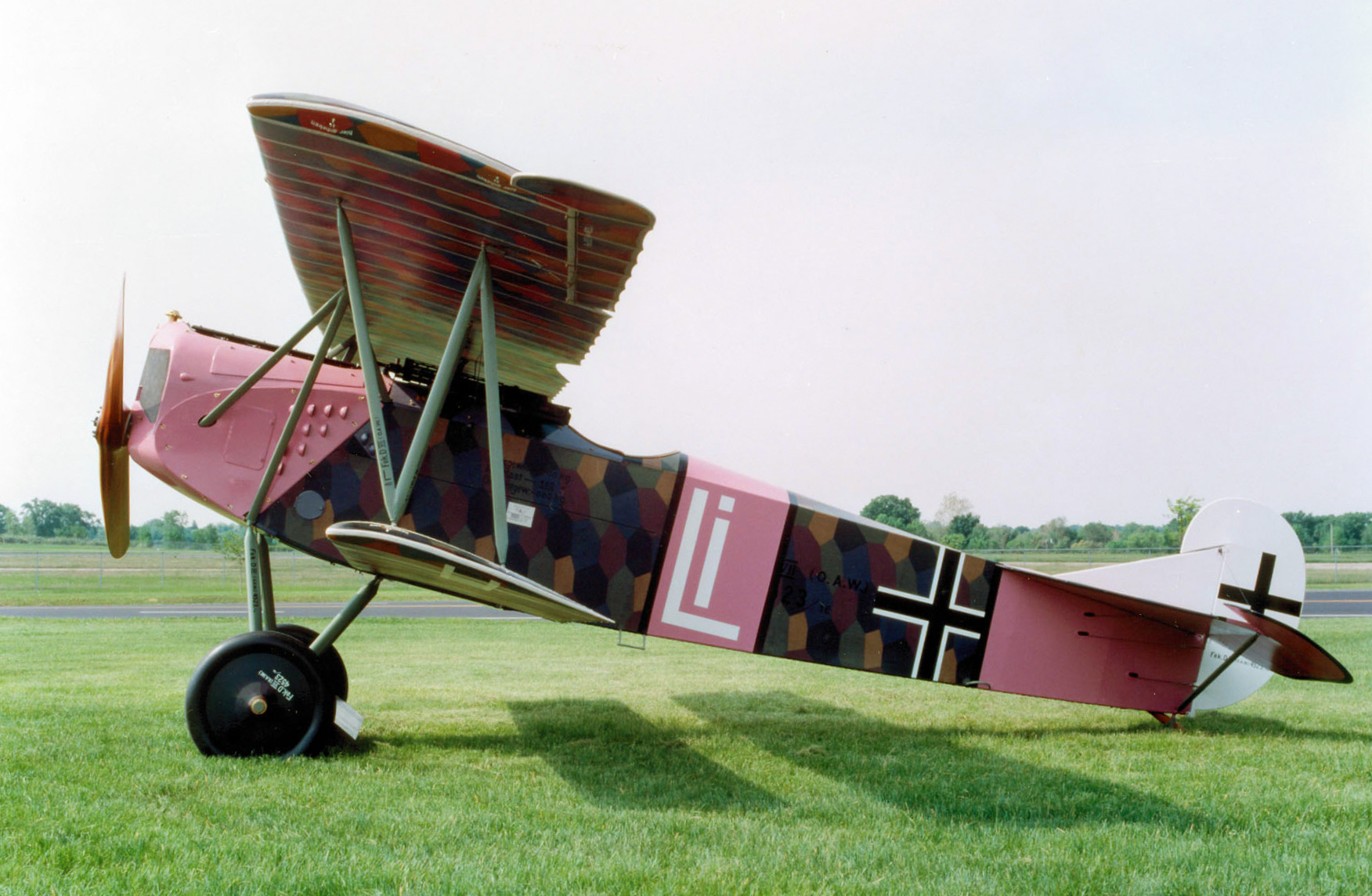
Fokker D.VII reproduction at the NMUSAF. The aircraft is painted in the colors of Leutnant Rudolf Stark of Jasta 35b

== World War I military service ==
Stark originally served heroically in the 2nd Royal Bavarian Uhlans, winning his native Bavaria's Military Merit Order on 29 September 1915 and the Second Class Iron Cross on 11 June 1916. He switched to aviation; his first assignment was to FAA 296, a reconnaissance unit, on 15 November 1917.

Stark requested a transfer to fighter duty, was sent to Jastaschule II, and was transferred to Jagdstaffel 34 on 18 January 1918. He was notably one of the eyewitnesses to the landing of the famous German flying ace Manfred von Richthofen, the Red Baron; he witnessed Richthofen make a smooth landing after his final fight, in a field on a hill near the Bray-Corbie road, just north of Vaux-sur-Somme. By the time he was promoted to acting commander of Jagdstaffel 77, on 24 May 1918, he was an ace, with five victories confirmed and one unconfirmed claim. He had only one of three victory claims approved while he led 77.

On 7 June, he received command of Jagdstaffel 35. Beginning 1 July, he shot down five more enemy planes, using a Fokker Dr.I designated by a lilac engine cowling and lilac band around its fuselage. He was wounded in action on 16 September, but carried on right up to his final victory two days before the Armistice.

== Post World War I ==
Stark wrote Wings of War: an Airman's Diary of the Last Year of World War One in 1933.
