= Nowy Folwark, Szamotuły County =

Nowy Folwark
- Settlement
- Location within Poland
- Coordinates: 52°37′14″N 16°37′37″E
- Country: Poland
- Voivodeship: Greater Poland
- County: Szamotuły
- Gmina: Szamotuły

Nowy Folwark [ˈnɔvɨ ˈfɔlvark] is a settlement in the administrative district of Gmina Szamotuły, within Szamotuły County, Greater Poland Voivodeship, in west-central Poland.
