= Mielno, Szamotuły County =

Mielno
- Village
- Location within Poland
- Coordinates: 52°33′28″N 16°22′57″E
- Country: Poland
- Voivodeship: Greater Poland
- County: Szamotuły
- Gmina: Szamotuły

Mielno [ˈmjɛlnɔ] is a village in the administrative district of Gmina Szamotuły, within Szamotuły County, Greater Poland Voivodeship, in west-central Poland.
