= Kępa, Szamotuły County =

Kępa
- Village
- Location within Poland
- Coordinates: 52°36′N 16°37′E
- Country: Poland
- Voivodeship: Greater Poland
- County: Szamotuły
- Gmina: Szamotuły

Kępa [ˈkɛmpa] is a village in the administrative district of Gmina Szamotuły, within Szamotuły County, Greater Poland Voivodeship, in west-central Poland.
