= Przecław, Szamotuły County =

Przecław
- Village
- Location within Poland
- Coordinates: 52°33′N 16°43′E
- Country: Poland
- Voivodeship: Greater Poland
- County: Szamotuły
- Gmina: Szamotuły

Przecław [ˈpʂɛt͡swaf] is a village in the administrative district of Gmina Szamotuły, within Szamotuły County, Greater Poland Voivodeship, in west-central Poland.
