= Koźle, Greater Poland Voivodeship =

Koźle
- Village
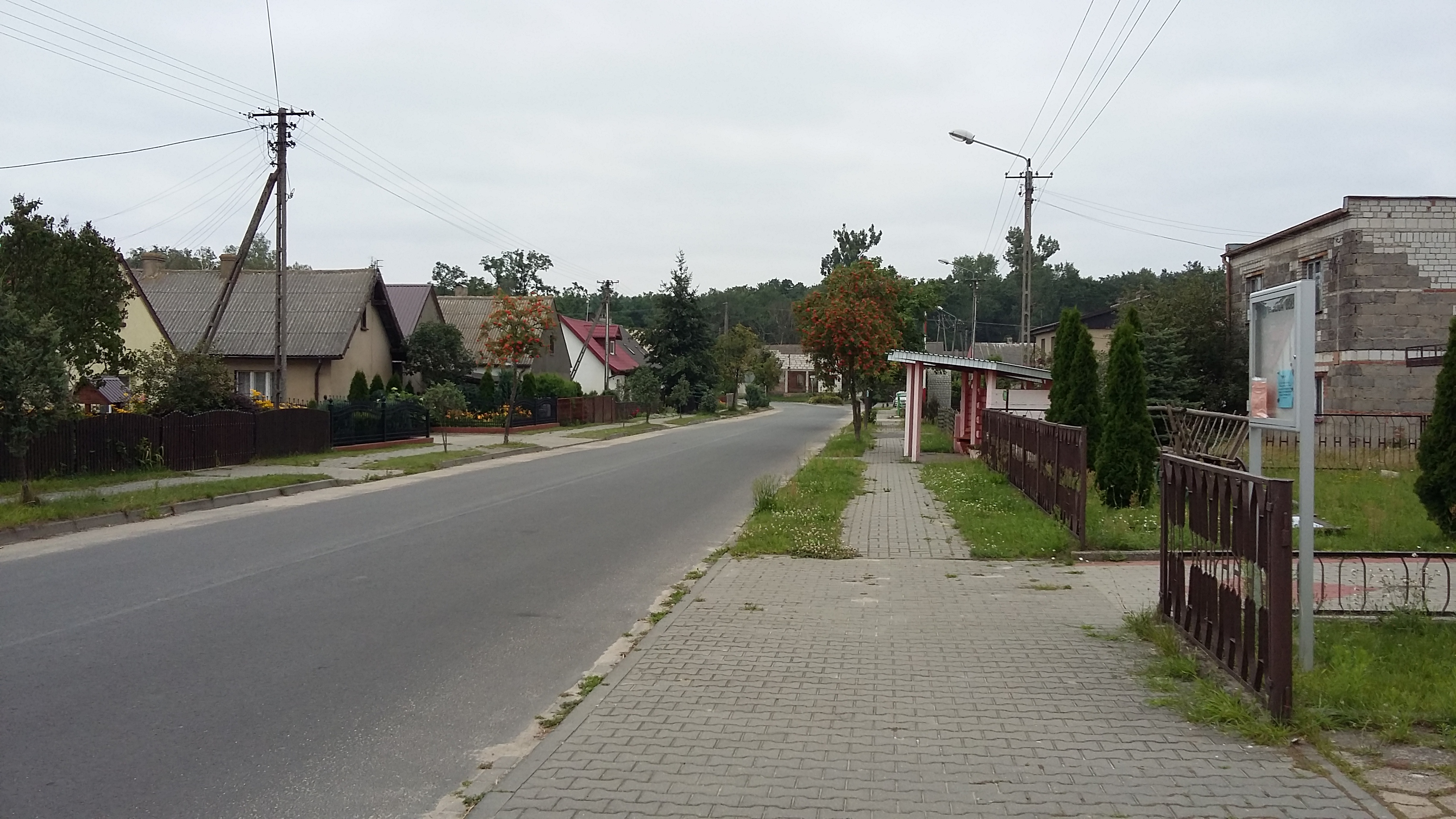

- Location within Poland
- Coordinates: 52°35′N 16°24′E
- Country: Poland
- Voivodeship: Greater Poland
- County: Szamotuły
- Gmina: Szamotuły
- Time zone: UTC+1 (CET)
  - Summer (DST): UTC+2 (CEST)
- Vehicle registration: PSZ

Koźle [ˈkɔʑlɛ] is a village in the administrative district of Gmina Szamotuły, within Szamotuły County, Greater Poland Voivodeship, in west-central Poland.

== History ==
Koźle was a private village owned by Polish nobility, administratively located in Poznań County, within the Poznań Voivodeship in the Greater Poland Province of the Polish Crown.

During the German occupation of Poland (World War II), inhabitants of Koźle were among the Poles massacred by the Germans on November 9, 1939, in Mędzisko, and on December 8, 1939, in Bukowiec, as part of the Intelligenzaktion. In 1939 and 1942, the German occupiers carried out expulsions of Poles, whose farms were then handed over to ethnic Germans as part of the Lebensraum policy. Poles expelled in 1939 were briefly held in a transit camp in Wronki, where they were stripped of any valuables before being deported to the Radom District of the General Government (German-occupied central Poland). Meanwhile, those expelled in 1942 were enslaved as forced labour and sent to either Germany or to new German colonists in the county.
