= Gałowo-Majątek =

- Village
- Location within Poland
- Coordinates: 52°35′33″N 16°34′8″E
- Country: Poland
- Voivodeship: Greater Poland
- County: Szamotuły
- Gmina: Szamotuły
- Population: 1,170

Gałowo-Majątek [ɡaˈwɔvɔ maˈjɔntɛk] is a village in the administrative district of Gmina Szamotuły, within Szamotuły County, Greater Poland Voivodeship, in west-central Poland.
