= Gałowo, Greater Poland Voivodeship =

Gałowo
- Village
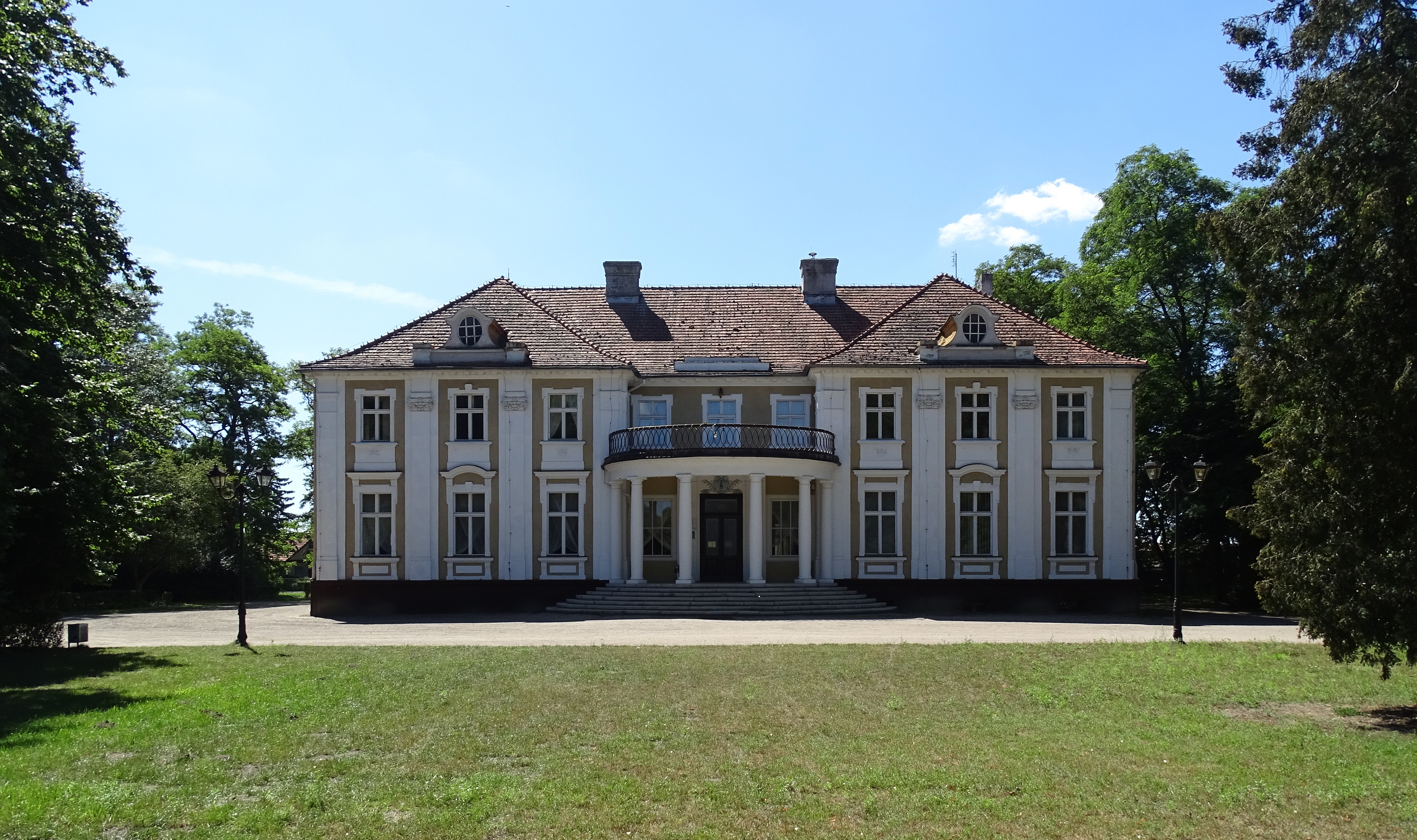
- Palace in Gałowo.

- Location within Poland
- Coordinates: 52°36′N 16°33′E
- Country: Poland
- Voivodeship: Greater Poland
- County: Szamotuły
- Gmina: Szamotuły

Gałowo [ɡaˈwɔvɔ] is a village in the administrative district of Gmina Szamotuły, within Szamotuły County, Greater Poland Voivodeship, in west-central Poland.
