= Lipnica, Szamotuły County =

Lipnica
- Village
- Location within Poland
- Coordinates: 52°34′N 16°28′E
- Country: Poland
- Voivodeship: Greater Poland
- County: Szamotuły
- Gmina: Szamotuły

Lipnica (Polish pronunciation: [lipˈɲit͡sa]) is a village in the administrative district of Gmina Szamotuły, within Szamotuły County, Greater Poland Voivodeship, in west-central Poland.
