= Myszkowo, Greater Poland Voivodeship =

Myszkowo
- Village
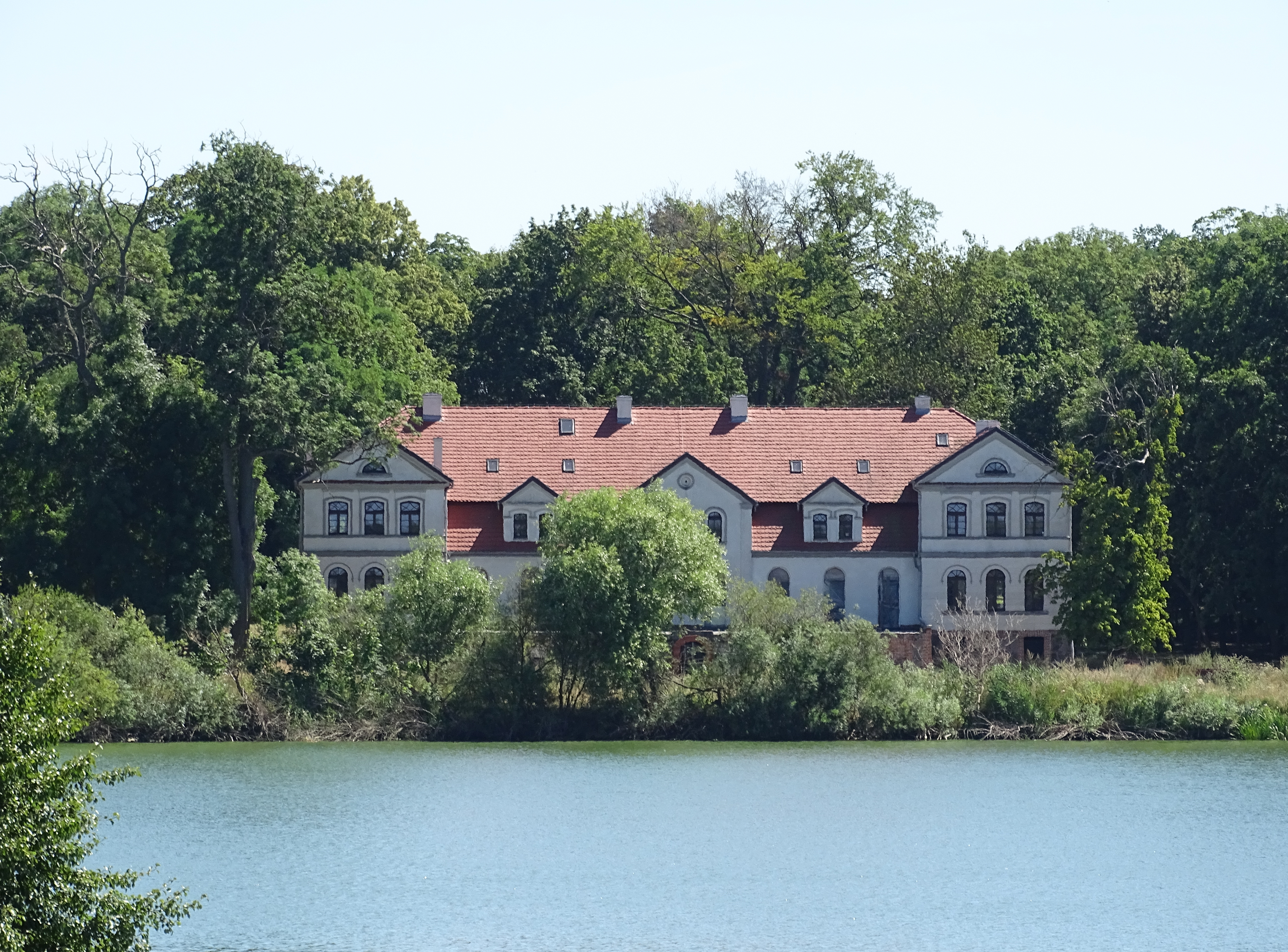
- Palace in Myszkowo from the 18th century.

- Location within Poland
- Coordinates: 52°33′N 16°35′E
- Country: Poland
- Voivodeship: Greater Poland
- County: Szamotuły
- Gmina: Szamotuły

Myszkowo [mɨʂˈkɔvɔ] is a village in the administrative district of Gmina Szamotuły, within Szamotuły County, Greater Poland Voivodeship, in west-central Poland.
