= Herbert Sellars =

Herbert Whiteley Sellars
- Born: 11 June 1896; Liverpool, Lancashire, England
- Died: 15 May 1918 (aged 21); Bouchou, France
- Burial place: Arras Flying Services Memorial, Pas de Calais, France
- Military career
- Allegiance: United Kingdom
- Branch: British Army; Royal Air Force
- Service years: 1916–1918
- Rank: Lieutenant
- Units: No. 25 Squadron RFC; No. 11 Squadron RFC/RAF
- Conflicts: World War I • Western Front
- Awards: Military Cross

Lieutenant Herbert Whiteley Sellars MC (11 June 1896 – 15 May 1918) was a British First World War flying ace credited with eight aerial victories. On 21 March 1918, Sellars shot down and killed the German ace Ludwig Hanstein.

== Biography ==
Sellars was born in Liverpool, the second son of Mr. and Mrs. Frank Sellars. He was educated at The Leas, Hoylake, and the Loretto School, Musselburgh, and was entered for Gonville and Caius College, Cambridge. He began learning to fly at the Beatty School at Hendon Aerodrome in December 1915, and on 10 May 1916 was granted Royal Aero Club Aviator's Certificate No. 2852 after flying a Caudron biplane.

He was then commissioned as a second lieutenant (on probation) in the Royal Flying Corps on 3 June 1916, appointed a flying officer on 20 July, and confirmed in his rank on 17 August. He was promoted to lieutenant on 1 July 1917.

Sellers served in No. 25 Squadron flying the two-seater F.E.2b on fighter/reconnaissance patrols, before transitioning to the Airco DH.4 for long-range reconnaissance and bombing. He was eventually transferred to No. 11 Squadron to fly the Bristol F.2 two-seater fighter, with Lieutenant Charles Crichton Robson as his observer/gunner. They gained their first victory on 12 March 1918 by shooting an LVG reconnaissance aircraft down in flames over Doignes. The following day they drove down out of control an Albatros D.V over Oisy, another over Rumilly on the 15th, and a third north of Saint-Quentin-la-Motte-Croix-au-Bailly on the 18th. On 21 March they destroyed two Albatros's in a dogfight over Morchies, one of which was piloted by Leutnant Ludwig Hanstein. On 1 April 1918, the Army's Royal Flying Corps and the Royal Naval Air Service were merged to form the Royal Air Force. The next day, 2 April, Sellars and Robson drove down a Fokker Dr.I south-east of Albert, and gained their eighth and final victory on 15 May, sharing in the driving down of another Dr.I over Mametz with Captain John Vincent Aspinall and Lieutenant de la Cour. Soon after this victory Sellars and Robson were reported missing. Their aircraft had been shot down and Sellars was killed, but Robson survived and was taken prisoner. They are believed to have fallen victim to Vizefeldwebel Josef Mai.

Sellars, having no known grave, is commemorated on the Arras Flying Services Memorial.

Sellars was awarded the Military Cross, which was gazetted posthumously on 21 June 1918. His citation read:

Lieutenant Herbert Whiteley Sellars, Royal Flying Corps, Special Reserve.

"For conspicuous gallantry and devotion to duty. Whilst on offensive patrol, he attacked a hostile two-seater machine, which dived vertically and eventually crashed. Having attacked another two-seater machine, which dived down over the enemy's lines, he engaged three hostile scouts, at the nearest of which his observer fired two bursts at 75 yards range, causing the enemy machine to crash down in flames. His skill and gallantry have been most marked."
