= Szczuczyn, Greater Poland Voivodeship =

Szczuczyn
- Village
- Location within Poland
- Coordinates: 52°38′N 16°35′E
- Country: Poland
- Voivodeship: Greater Poland
- County: Szamotuły
- Gmina: Szamotuły

Szczuczyn (pronounced [ˈʂt͡ʂut͡ʂɨn]) is a village in the administrative district of Gmina Szamotuły, within Szamotuły County, Greater Poland Voivodeship, in west-central Poland.
