= Jagdstaffel 77 =

Jasta 77
- Active: 1917–1918
- Country: Kingdom of Bavaria, German Empire
- Branch: Luftstreitkräfte
- Type: Fighter squadron
- Engagements: World War I

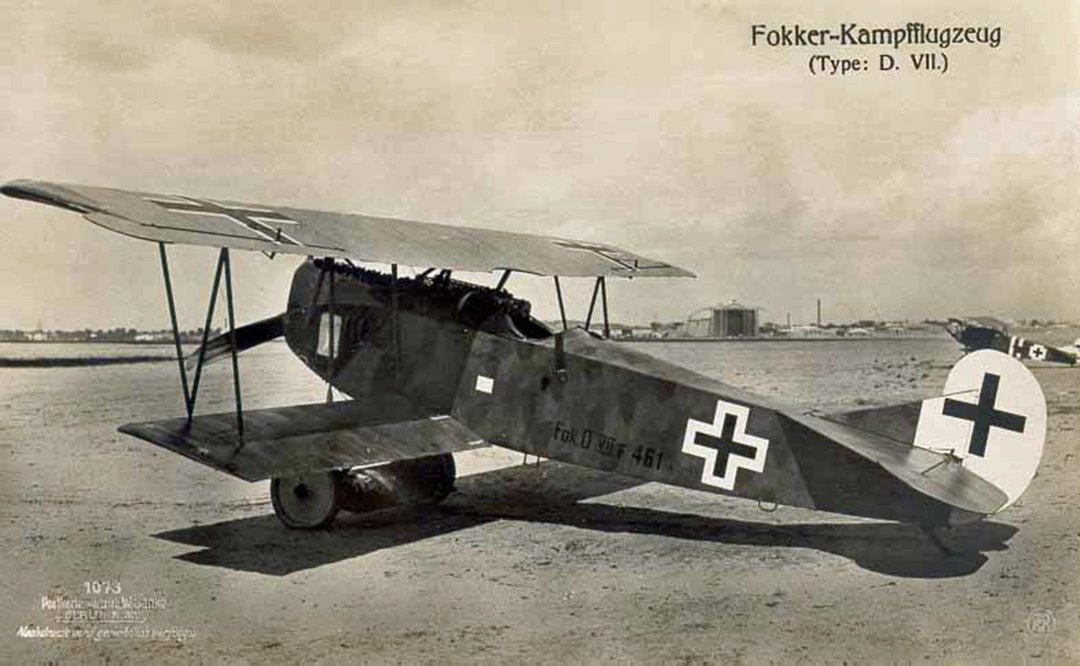

Royal Bavarian Jagdstaffel 77, commonly abbreviated to Jasta 77, was a "hunting group" (i.e., fighter squadron) of the Luftstreitkräfte, the air arm of the Imperial German Army during World War I. The squadron would score over 28 aerial victories during the war, including three observation balloons downed. The unit's victories came at the expense of four killed in action, one killed in a flying accident, one wounded in action, three injured in aviation accidents, and one taken prisoner of war.

== History ==
Jasta 77 was founded on 25 November 1917 at Fliegerersatz-Abteilung ("Replacement Detachment") 1, Schleissheim. On 2 December 1917, the new squadron was assigned to Armee-Abteilung B. Jasta 77 scored its first victories on 5 January 1918. On 27 March 1918, it was transferred to 2 Armee. On 9 July 1918, it shifted postings again, to 3 Armee. Jasta 77 moved once more, to 19 Armee, on 9 August 1918. It remained there until war's end.

== Commanding officers (Staffelführer) ==
- Otto Deindl: 25 November 1917 – 21 January 1918
- Walter Ewers: 21 January 1918 – 15 May 1918
- Amandus Rostock: 15 May 1918 – 24 May 1918
- Rudolf Stark: 24 May 1918 – 7 June 1918
- Otto Fuchs: 7 June 1918 – 10 July 1918
- Max Gossner: 10 July 1918

== Duty stations ==
- Habsheim, France: 2 December 1917
- Le Cateau-Cambrésis, France: 27 March 1918
- Vraignes, France: 2 April 1918
- Foucaucourt, France: 24 April 1918
- Saint-Marie, France: 9 July 1918
- Renchen: 9 August 1918
