= Maurice Newnham =

British flying ace

Maurice Ashdown Newnham
- Born: 31 August 1897; Kensington, London, England
- Died: October 1974 (aged 77)
- Military career
- Allegiance: England
- Branch: Aviation
- Service years: 1914-1918; 1939-1954
- Rank: Group Captain
- Units: No. 4 Squadron RFC, No. 65 Squadron RAF
- Other work: Founded and ran paratrooper training school during World War II

Group Captain Maurice Ashdown Newnham OBE, DFC (31 August 1897 – October 1974) was a World War I flying ace credited with 18 aerial victories.

He originally joined the Royal Flying Corps as a 17-year-old courier. He was assigned to No. 4 Squadron in France. A year and a half later, he underwent pilot's training.

He was then forwarded to a Sopwith Camel unit, No. 65 Squadron. On 25 April 1918, he was shot down by Josef Mai. On 10 May 1918, he scored his first victory by destroying an Albatros D.V. He became an ace on 29 June. He flew 102 offensive patrols in six months, and steadily accumulated victories through 9 November 1918. His final total included victories over 14 enemy fighters and a reconnaissance two-seater. He was also a balloon buster, having shot down three enemy observation balloons.

Between the wars, Newnham was involved with the Triumph motorcycle and automobile company. As early as 1933, he stocked them in his automotive sales center. He was appointed to head it in 1936 as managing director and chief executive. He sold off the motorcycle division and turned the company from producing sports cars to building undistinguished family sedans. This policy put the company in serious financial straits, as the sedan market was overcrowded. The Bombing of Coventry destroyed the motorcycle plant and damaged the automobile factory seriously enough to shut down production.

Newnham returned to service during World War II, rejoining the RAF on 11 November 1939 as a pilot officer (probationary), with the service number 75897. He was confirmed in his rank the following 11 November, having been promoted to war-substantive flying officer on 22 February 1940. After a spell of administrative duties, he was promoted to flight lieutenant in 1942 and established and ran the British Parachute Training School, a feat he recorded in his book, Prelude to Glory. He took that post as an acting squadron leader on 9 July 1941. He was promoted to the temporary rank of squadron leader on 1 July 1943 and retroactively promoted to the war-substantive rank on 29 June 1943 (gazetted 20 August 1943). Despite being in his 40s, he personally parachuted numerous times. He insisted on testing all improved equipment before it went into general use in the school.

Newnham was appointed an Officer of the Order of the British Empire (OBE) (Military Division), in the 1944 Birthday Honours list. He was promoted to war-substantive wing commander on 20 May 1945. After the war, Newnham returned to running his auto sales center. He formally relinquished his wartime commission on 10 February 1954, retaining the rank of group captain.

== Honors and awards ==
Distinguished Flying Cross (DFC)

Lieut. Maurice Ashdown Newnham. (FRANCE)

From the London Gazette:

"This officer has taken part in several night-bombing raids and in 102 offensive patrols, many of which he has led with ability and success. On the night of 23–24 September Lt. Newnham carried out a very successful long distance raid on an enemy aerodrome. Owing to heavy rain and a strong west wind he had difficulty in reaching his objective. Undeterred by this, he succeeded, and effectively bombed the aerodrome, obtaining two direct hits on a large Zeppelin shed. He then attacked other objectives, descending to ground level to do so. He returned to our lines after a 2½ hours flight."
