= Joseph Chayyim Caro =

German-Russian rabbi

Joseph Chayyim ben Isaac Selig Caro (1800 – April 21, 1895, Włocławek, Russian Empire, now Poland) was a notable rabbi. He was educated as an Orthodox Talmudist, and married the daughter of Rabbi Tzebi Hirsch Amsterdam of Konin, government of Kalisz in Russian Poland, whose pupil he became. He afterward established himself as a merchant in Gnesen (Gniezno), near Posen (Poznań), whence, at about the age of forty, he was called to the rabbinate of Pinne (Pniewy), in the province of Posen. Later he became rabbi of Fordon, in the same province, and twenty years after his first call he became rabbi of the progressive and Germanized community of Wloclawek, where he remained until his death. He was one of the first truly Orthodox rabbis in Russia to acquire a correct knowledge of German and to deliver sermons in that language.

Caro was famous not only for his extensive rabbinical knowledge, but also as a preacher. His works remained popular among old-style maggidim (preachers) and darshanim (exegetes). His first work, Minchat Shabbat, is a German translation (in Hebrew characters) of Pirqe Abot, with a short commentary in German and a longer one in Hebrew (Krotoschin, 1847). In the third edition of that work (Wilna, 1894) the German commentary is omitted, and that of Maimonides is substituted for it. Caro's Teba we-Haken – containing rules of shechita (ritual slaughter) and bedikah (verification) in the form of a dialogue – was published by his sons Isaac and Jacob (Leipzig, 1859; 2d ed., Wilna, 1894). His chief work, Qol Omer Qera, is a collection of sermons in four volumes (Warsaw, 1860–80; 2d ed., Wilna, 1895), arranged after the order of the Pentateuch in the weekly sections, which furnished the texts.

The last of his published works, Yoreh u-Malqosh (Wilna, 1894), is also a collection of sermons, mostly funeral orations, some of which were originally delivered in German. Here and there in his works are to be found poetical compositions and other traces of the influence of modern ideas not common among the rabbis of Russian Poland. His inclination toward the Haskalah and its Neo-Hebrew literature is shown by the article which he contributed, at a very advanced age, to the year-book Ha-Asif (iv. 132–137, Warsaw, 1887), entitled "Birkat ha-Tzeduqim." Caro was also a pioneer Zionist and defended the colonization of Palestine against the opponents of that plan. Two of his letters on the subject are printed in Shibat Tzion. He attended to his rabbinical duties until past the age of ninety, and retired from active work only a few years before his death.

One of Caro's sons became a professor at the University of Breslau, and two others were the rabbis, respectively, of Lemberg (Lviv) and Thorn (Toruń).
