= Szamotuły =

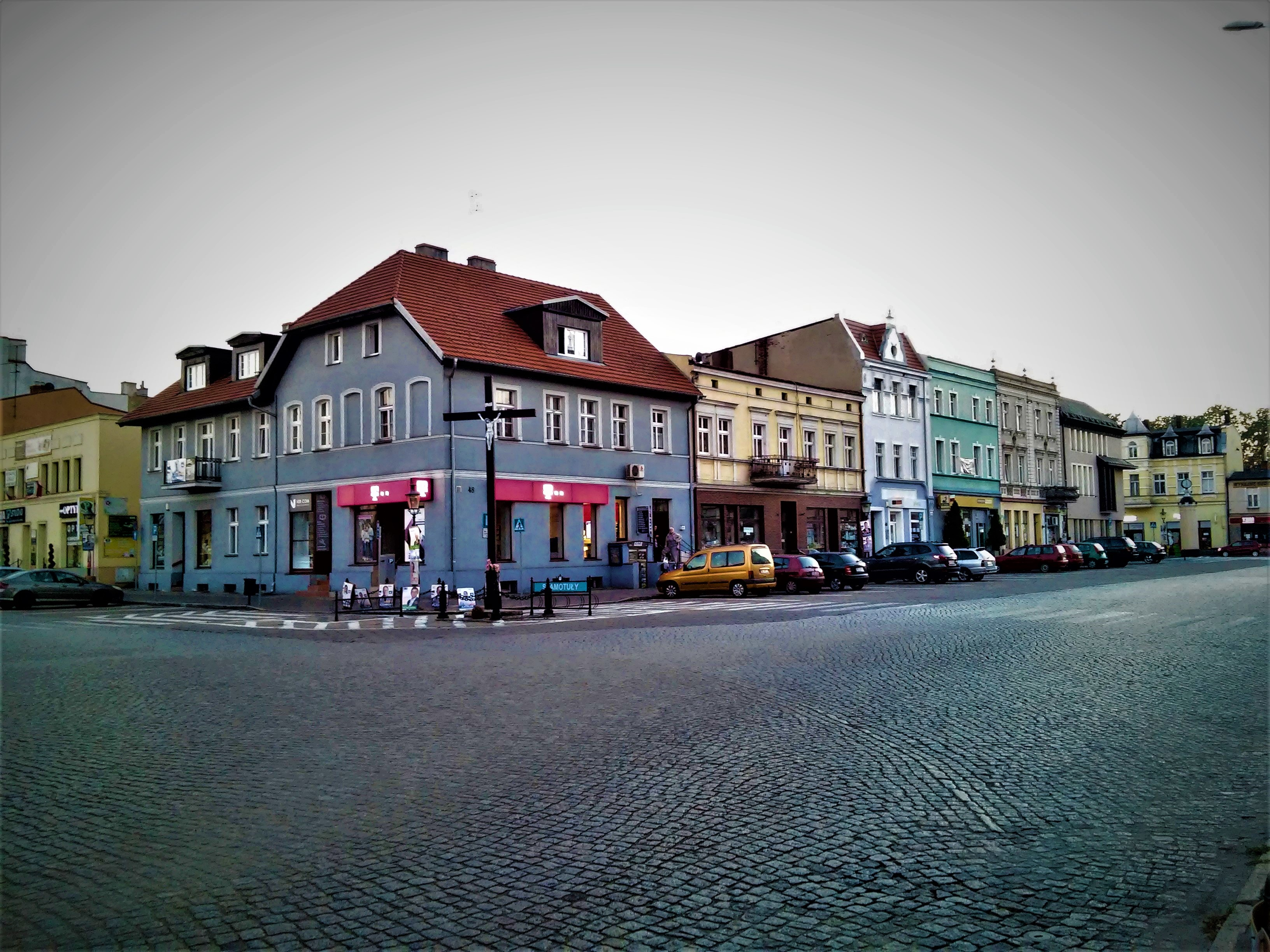
- Historic town center (2018; before reconstruction)

- Flag Coat of arms

- Location within Poland
- Coordinates: 52°36′N 16°35′E
- Country: Poland
- Voivodeship: Greater Poland
- County: Szamotuły
- Gmina: Szamotuły

Government
  - City mayor: Piotr Michalak

Area
  - Total: 10.11 km^{2} (3.90 sq mi)
- Elevation: 115 m (377 ft)

Population (2021)
  - Total: 18,569
  - Density: 1,837/km^{2} (4,757/sq mi)
- Time zone: UTC+1 (CET)
  - Summer (DST): UTC+2 (CEST)
- Postal code: 64-500
- Vehicle registration: PSZ
- Primary airport: Poznań–Ławica Airport
- Website: http://www.szamotuly.pl

Szamotuły [ʂamɔˈtuwɨ] (German: Samter, Yiddish: Zamter) is a town in western Poland, in Greater Poland Voivodeship, about 35 kilometres (22 miles) northwest of the centre of Poznań. It is the seat of Szamotuły County and of the smaller administrative district Gmina Szamotuły. The population was 19,090 in 2011.

== History ==
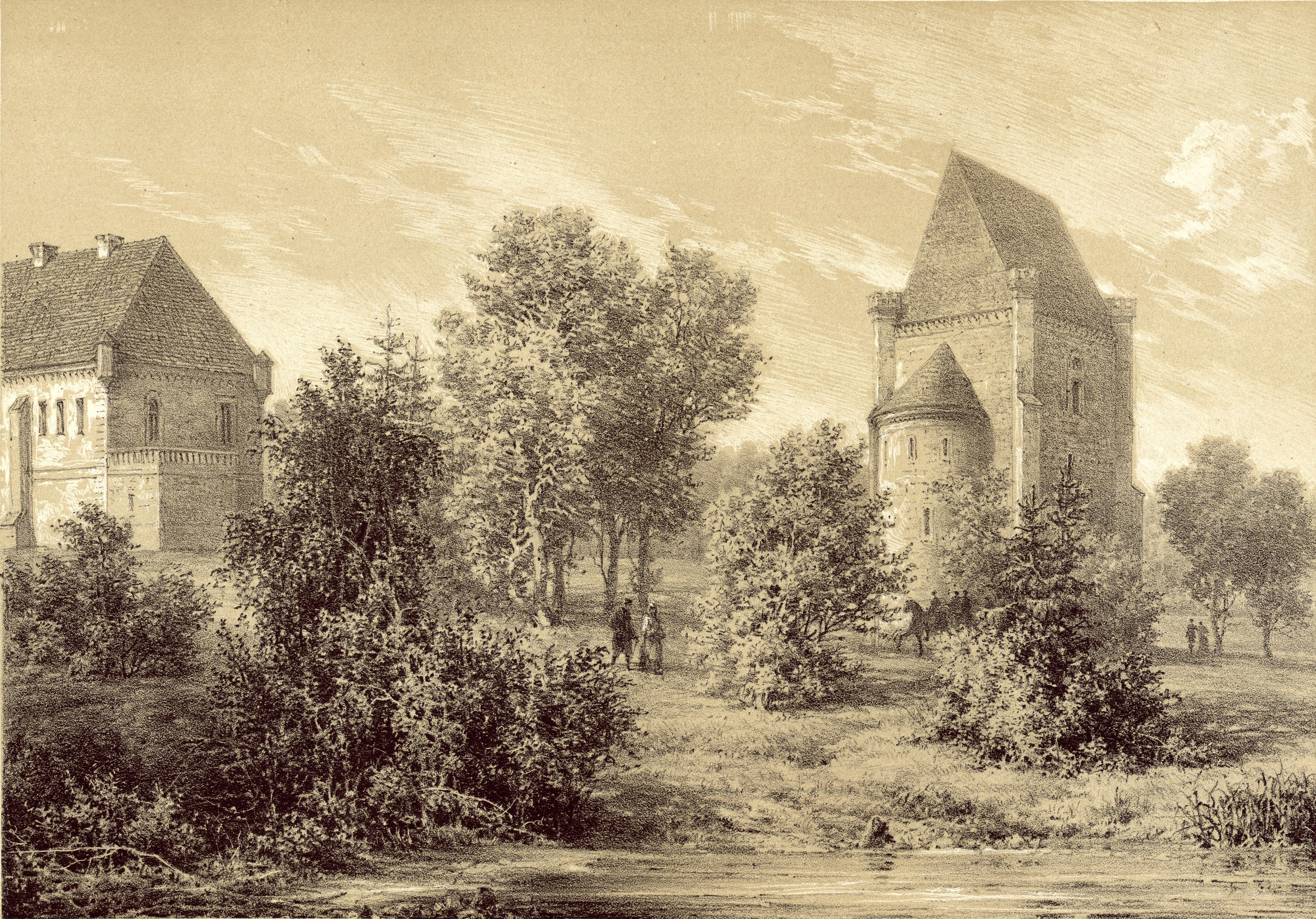
19th-century view of the Górka Castle

Szamotuły was probably founded in the 11th century, and was first mentioned in documents in 1231. Duke Przemysł I of Greater Poland established local fairs before 1257. Szamotuły was granted town rights in 1383 or earlier. It was a private town of Polish nobility, administratively located in the Poznań County in the Poznań Voivodeship in the Greater Poland Province of the Polish Crown.

During the joint German-Soviet invasion of Poland, which started World War II in September 1939, the town was invaded and then occupied by Germany. On 12 September 1939 the German Einsatzgruppe VI entered the town to commit various atrocities against Poles as part of the Intelligenzaktion. The Germans carried out mass arrests of local Poles under the pretext of "gathering, plotting, mistreating the Volksdeutsche and anti-German activity". Arrested Poles from the town and county were imprisoned in a newly established Nazi prison, and then hundreds were massacred in the nearby Bytyń, Kobylniki and Mędzisko forests between October 1939 and January 1940. On 12–13 October and 13 December 1939, the Germans also carried out public executions of Poles in the town. In December 1939, the Germans carried out first expulsions of Polish intelligentsia and owners of shops and workshops, which were then handed over to German colonists as part of the Lebensraum policy. Further expulsions of Poles were carried out in 1940–1941 and 1944. Despite such circumstances, the Polish resistance movement was active in the town, and structures of the Polish Underground State were organized. The Germans also destroyed the pre-war monument of Polish insurgents of the Greater Poland Uprising. In 1945 the German occupation ended and the town was restored to Poland, although with a Soviet-installed communist regime, which remained in power until the Fall of Communism in the 1980s. In June 1945, the Home Army carried out a successful attack on a communist prison and liberated captured resistance members.

== Sports ==
The local football club is Sparta Szamotuły. It competes in the lower leagues.

== Notable people ==
- Wacław z Szamotuł (1520s-1560s), composer and writer
- John Jonston (1603-1675), natural scientist and historian
- Siegmund Lubszynski (Lubin) (1841-1923), American film pioneer, the first Jewish "Movie Mogul"
- Philipp Scharwenka (1847-1917), composer and music educator
- Xaver Scharwenka (1850-1924), composer and pianist
- Hans Georg Friedrich Groß (1860-1924), German balloonist and airship constructor
- Alexander Hollaender (1898–1986), scientist
- Maksymilian Ciężki (1899-1951), cryptographer
- Ernst Wellmann (1904–1970), Wehrmacht officer
- Małgorzata Braunek (1947-2014), actress
- Jakub Rutnicki (born 1978), Polish politician and Minister of Sport and Tourism

== International relations ==
=== Twin towns – Sister cities ===
Szamotuły is twinned with:

- Brignoles, France
- Groß-Gerau, Germany
- Tielt, Belgium
- Bruneck, Italy

== Gallery ==
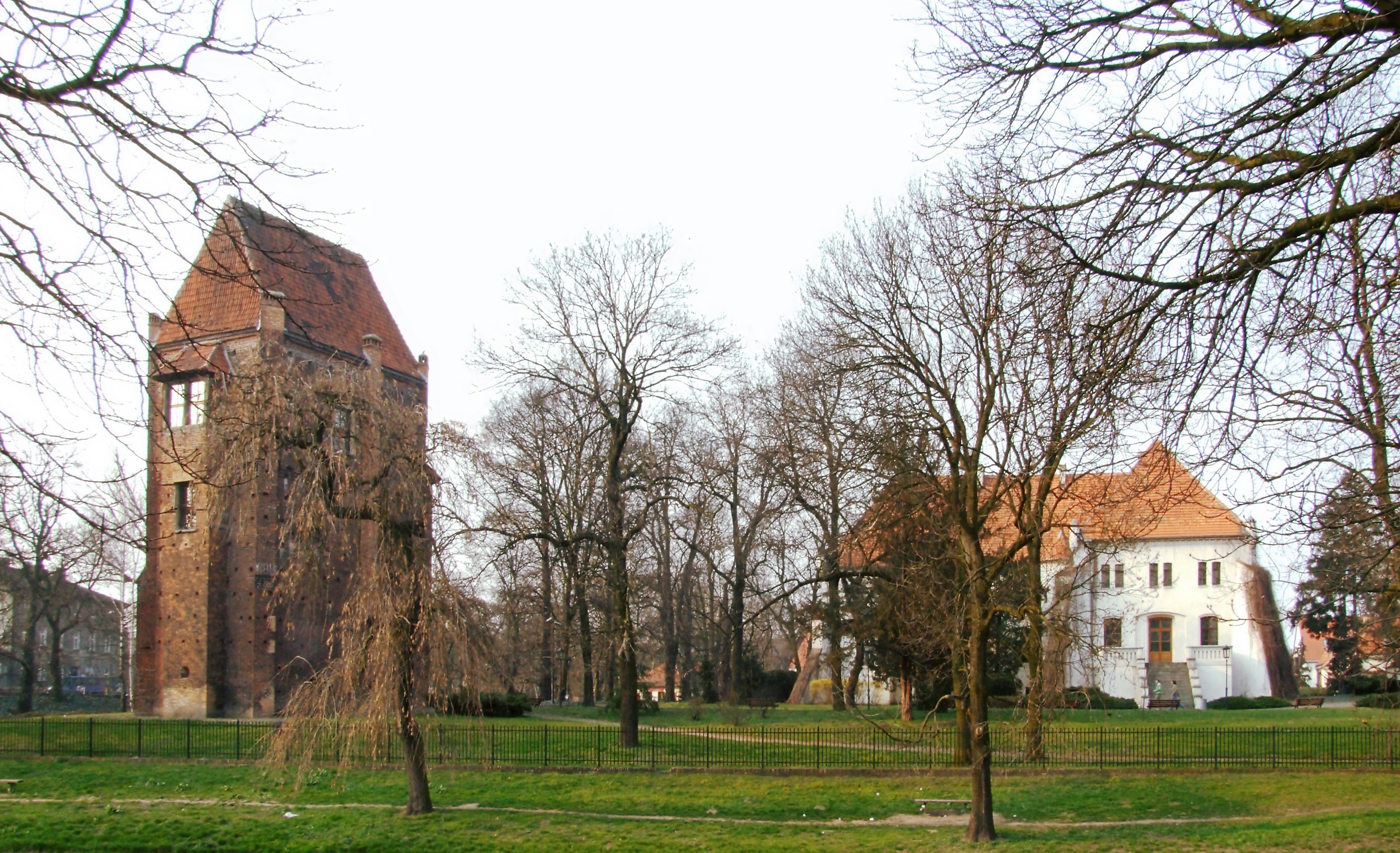
Górka Castle seen from the park

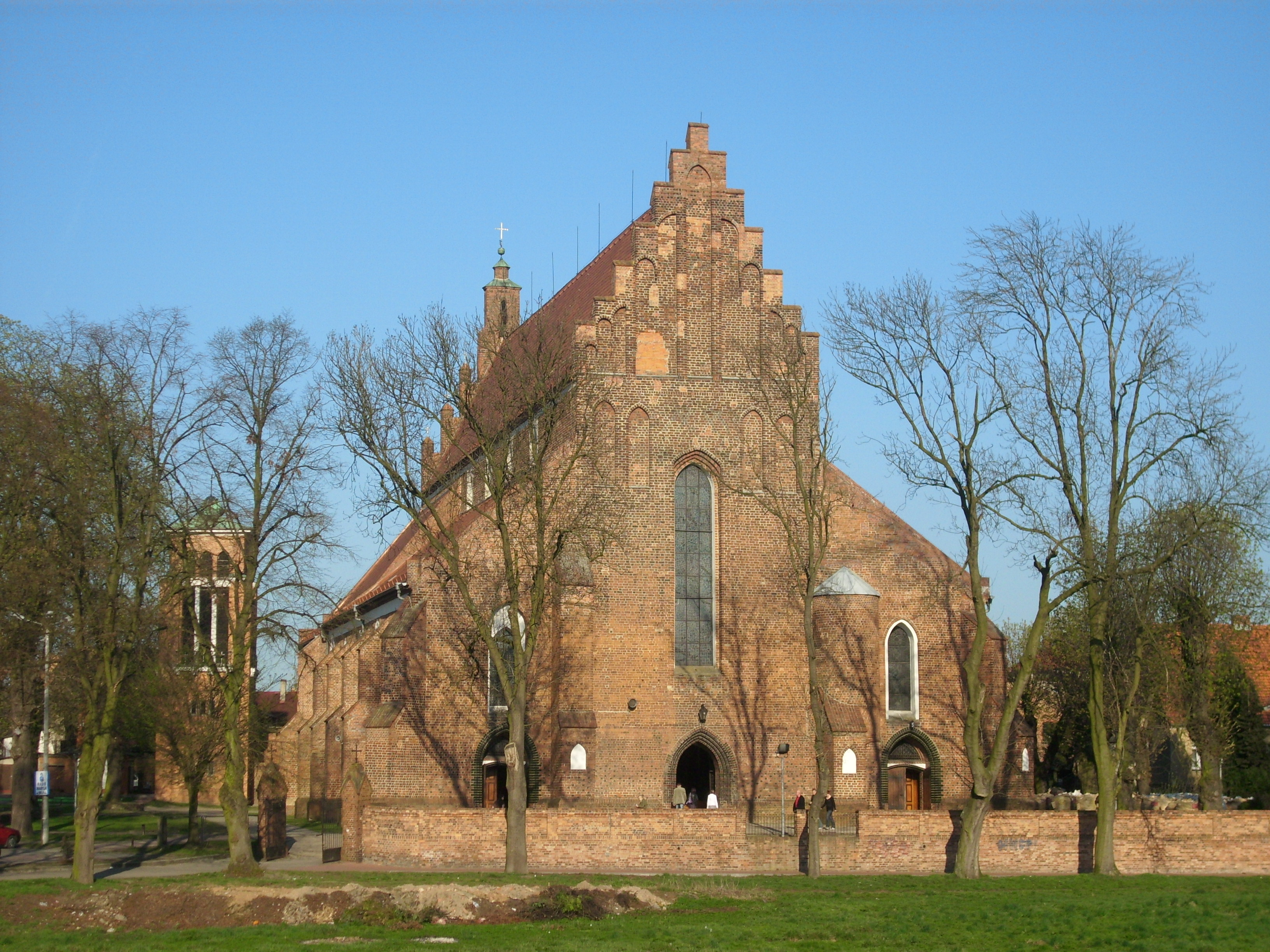
Gothic Minor Basilica Church (formerly Collegiate Church)

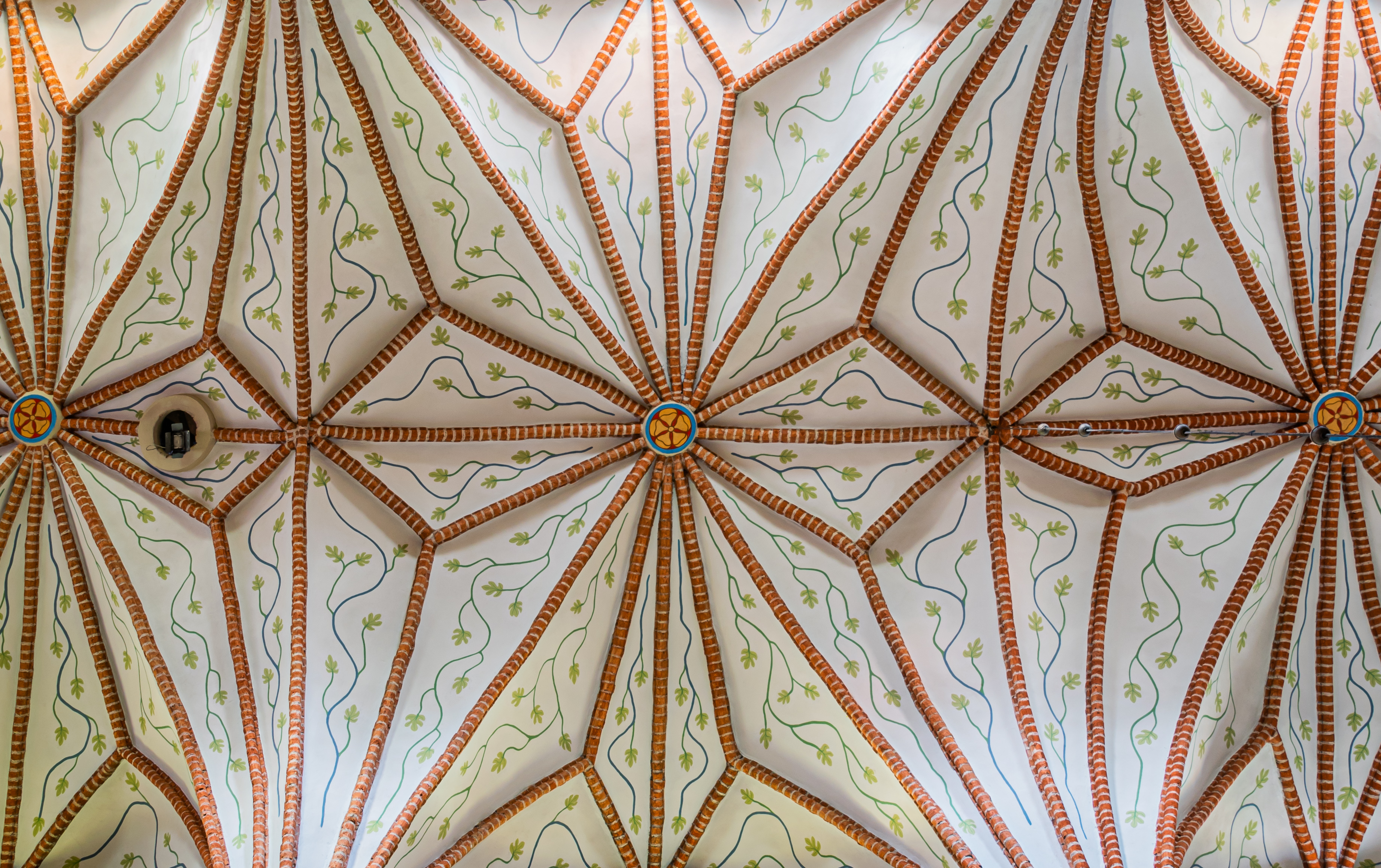
Vault of the Gothic Collegiate Church

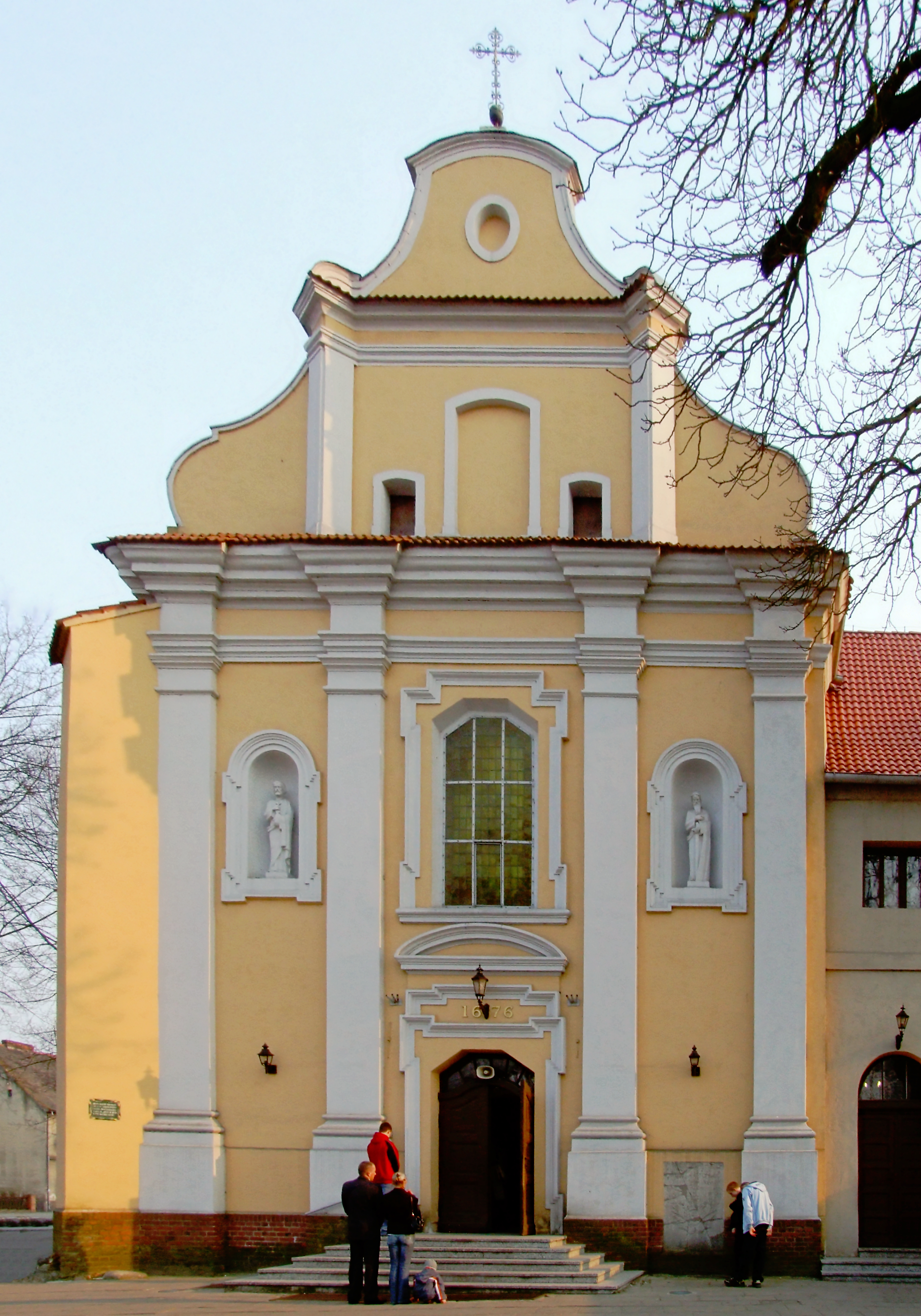
Baroque Holy Cross Church

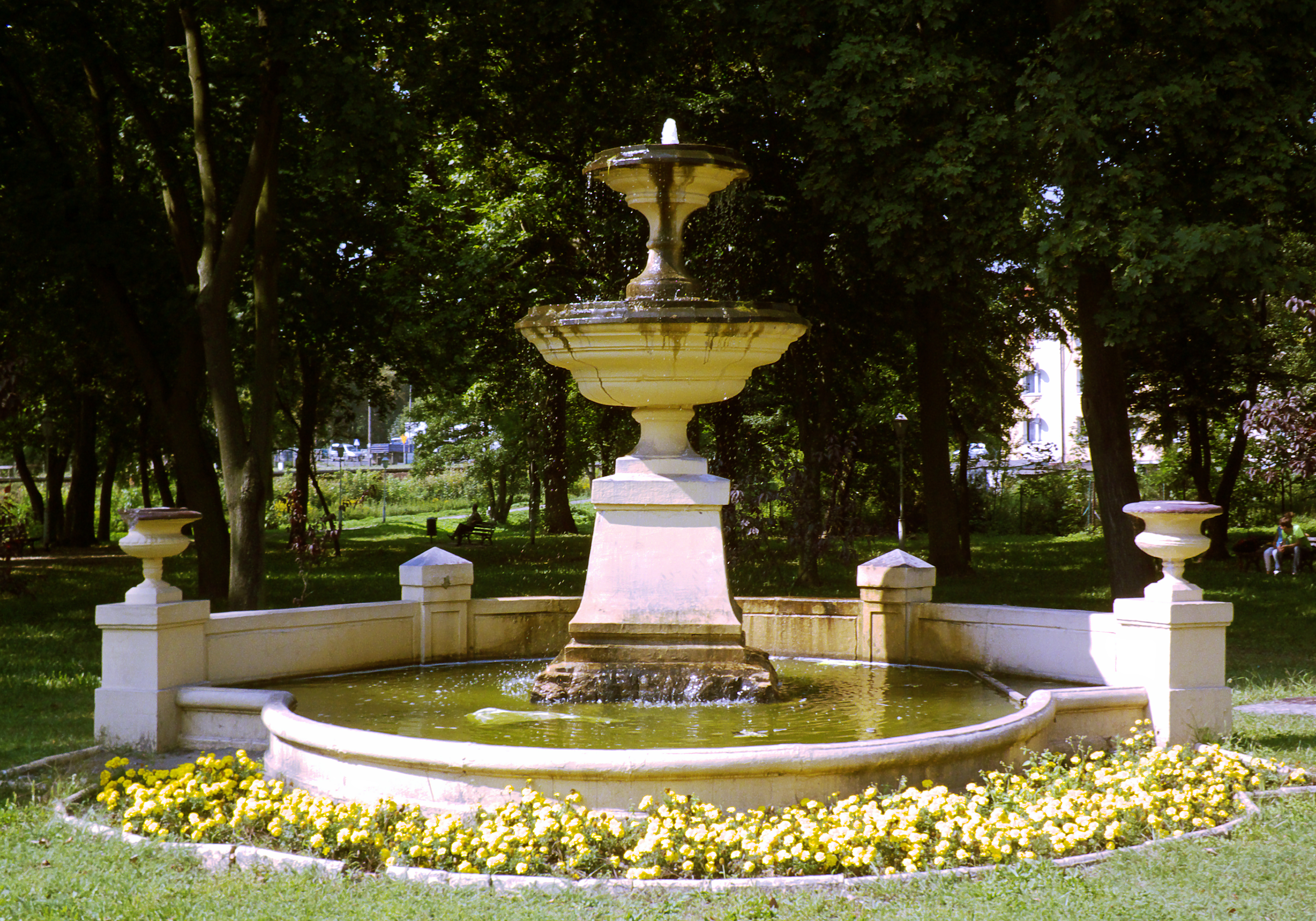
Fountain in the old park

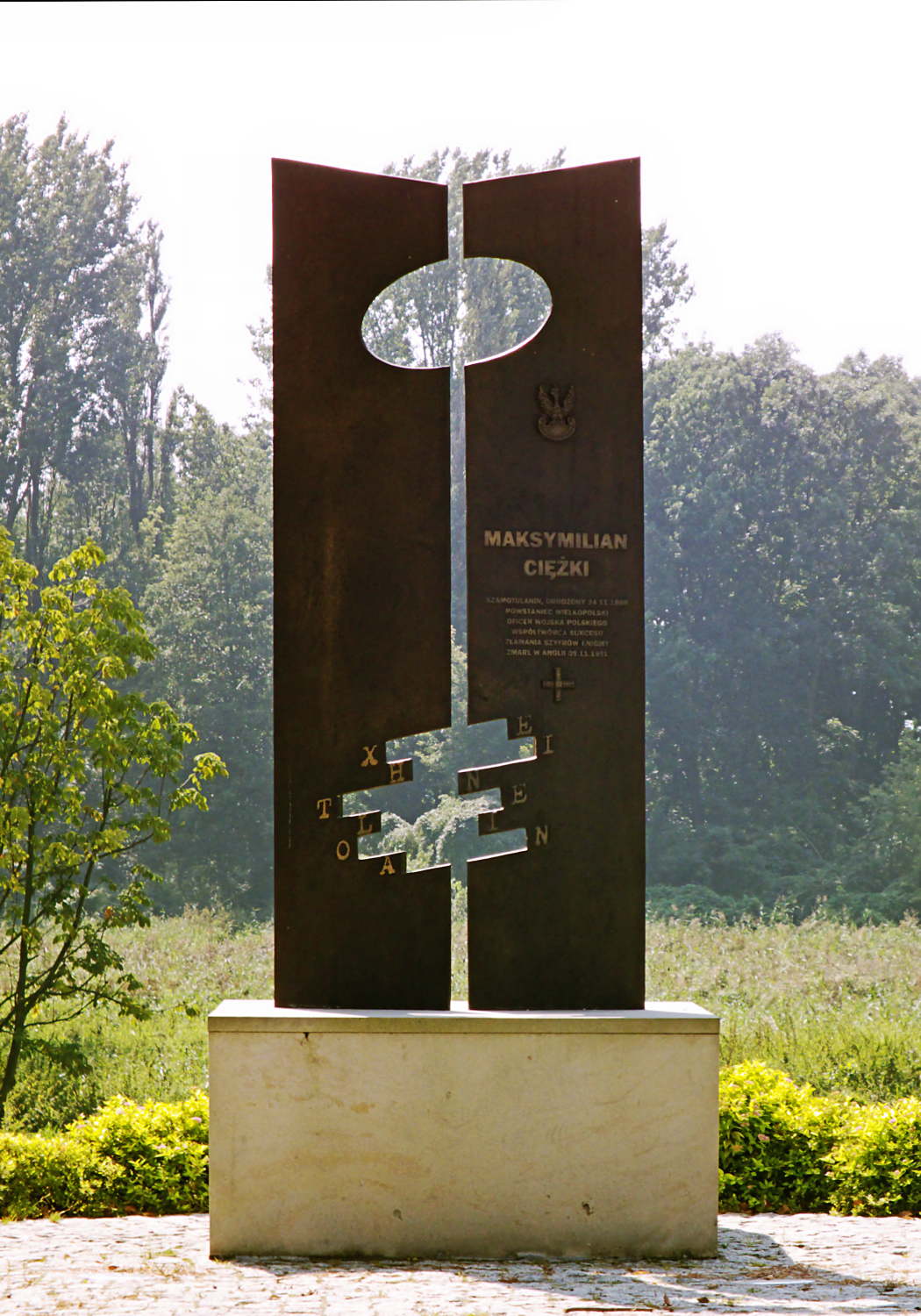
Monument to officer and cryptographer Maksymilian Ciężki
