= Mędzisko =

- Settlement
- Location within Poland
- Coordinates: 52°40′11″N 16°35′7″E
- Country: Poland
- Voivodeship: Greater Poland
- County: Szamotuły
- Gmina: Obrzycko
- Time zone: UTC+1 (CET)
  - Summer (DST): UTC+2 (CEST)
- Vehicle registration: PSZ

Mędzisko is a settlement in the administrative district of Gmina Obrzycko, within Szamotuły County, Greater Poland Voivodeship, in west-central Poland.

== History ==
According to the 1921 census, the village had a population of 11, entirely Polish by nationality and Roman Catholic by confession.

During the German occupation of Poland (World War II), Mędzisko was the site of a massacre of around 420 Poles from the region, including nearby towns of Czarnków, Międzychód, Pniewy, Szamotuły and Wronki, carried out by the Germans throughout October–December 1939 as part of the genocidal Intelligenzaktion campaign. In 1944, the Germans burned the bodies of the victims in attempt to cover up the crime.
