= Warsaw (disambiguation) =

Warsaw is the capital of Poland.

Warsaw may also refer to:

== Music ==
- Joy Division, known as Warsaw 1977–1978
  - Warsaw (album)
  - "Warsaw" (song)
- Warsaw Concerto, by Richard Addinsell
- "Warsaw", a song by Dessa, 2013
- "Warsaw", a song by Lovejoy on Wake Up & It's Over

== Places ==
=== Canada ===
- Warsaw, Douro-Dummer, Peterborough County, Ontario

=== Poland ===
- Warsaw metropolitan area
- Warsaw (European Parliament constituency)
- Warsaw Voivodeship (disambiguation)
- Warszawa, Greater Poland Voivodeship
- Duchy of Warsaw (1807–1815)
- Warsaw concentration camp, a Nazi concentration camp (1943–1944)

=== United States ===
- Warsaw, Alabama
- Warsaw, Georgia
- Warsaw Township, Hancock County, Illinois
  - Warsaw, Illinois
- Warsaw, Indiana
- Warsaw, Kentucky
- Warsaw Township, Goodhue County, Minnesota
- Warsaw Township, Rice County, Minnesota
  - Warsaw, Minnesota
- Warsaw, Missouri
- Warsaw, New York
  - Warsaw (village), New York
- Warsaw, North Carolina
- Warsaw, North Dakota
- Warsaw, Ohio
- Warsaw Township, Pennsylvania
  - Warsaw, Pennsylvania
- Warsaw, Texas
- Warsaw, Virginia

== Other uses ==
- Warsaw (video game), a 2019 video game by Pixelated Milk

== See also ==
- Battle of Warsaw (disambiguation)
- Warsaw railway station (disambiguation)
- Varsovia (disambiguation)
- Warsow (disambiguation)
- Warszawa (disambiguation)
- Wausau (disambiguation)
- Treaty of Warsaw (disambiguation)
- Warsaw Confederation (1704)
- Warsaw Convention, about international carriage by air
- Warsaw Pact, between the Soviet Union and 7 other Eastern Bloc socialist republics
- Warshaw's, a defunct supermarket in Montreal's historic Jewish district
- Hyporthodus nigritus, a species of fish often referred to as the Warsaw grouper
