= Warsaw Township =

Warsaw Township may refer to:

- Warsaw Township, Hancock County, Illinois
- Warsaw Township, Goodhue County, Minnesota
- Warsaw Township, Rice County, Minnesota
- Warsaw Township, Pennsylvania

== See also ==
- Warsaw (disambiguation)#United States
