= Warszawa (disambiguation) =

Warszawa or Warsaw is the capital of Poland.

Warszawa may also refer to:

== Places ==
- Warszawa, Greater Poland Voivodeship in west-central Poland
- Warszawa, Bytów County, Pomeranian Voivodeship, in northern Poland
- Warszawa, Kościerzyna County in Pomeranian Voivodeship, north Poland
- Warszawa Neighborhood District, a historic district in Cleveland, Ohio, U.S.

== Ships ==
- ORP Warszawa, several Polish Navy ships
- SS Susana, a cargo steamship that between 1920 and 1923 was called Warszawa

== Other uses ==
- Warszawa (Praxis album), 1999
- "Warszawa" (song), a 1977 song by David Bowie and Brian Eno from the album Low
- FSO Warszawa, a Polish automobile manufactured 1951–1973

== See also ==
- Warsaw (disambiguation)
- Red Warszawa, a Danish heavy metal band
- Warszewo (disambiguation)
