= Varshavsky =

Varshavsky (masculine), Varshavskaya (feminine), or Varshavskoye (neuter) may refer to:

- Varshavsky (surname)

== Places ==
- Varshavsky Rail Terminal, a former rail terminal in St. Petersburg, Russia
- Varshavskaya (Moscow Metro), a station of the Moscow Metro, Russia
- Varshavsky railway station (Gatchina), a railway station in Gatchina, Russia
- Varshavskoye (MPD), a motion power depot of the Moscow Metro
- Varshavskoye Shosse, a highway in Moscow, Russia
- Warsaw Governorate (Varshavskaya Guberniya)
