= WOSO =

WOSO or Woso may refer to:

- WOSO (AM), a radio station (1300 AM) licensed to serve Mayaguez, Puerto Rico, United States
- WOSO (1030 AM), a defunct radio station formerly licensed to serve San Juan, Puerto Rico, which operated from 1977 to 2014
- A colloquial term for women's soccer
- "Woso", a 2020 song by Mista Silva
- "Woso", a 2009 song by Okyeame Kwame

== See also ==
- Wausau (disambiguation)
