= Faribault Public Schools =

School district in Minnesota, United States

Coordinates: 44°16′12″N 93°16′46″W

The Faribault Public Schools comprise the public elementary and secondary schools and other educational facilities in and near the city of Faribault, Minnesota, United States. The school district, ISD #656, includes the city and surrounding rural communities. The majority of the district is in Rice County, and there the district includes Faribault, Nerstrand, and much of the Warsaw census-designated place. A small portion of the district extends into Goodhue County.

The district operates an early childhood center, four elementary schools (one of which is a charter school), a middle school, the Faribault High School, the Area Learning Center, and the Faribault Education Center which offers adult education.
