= Cannon Lake (Rice County, Minnesota) =

Lake in the state of Minnesota, United States

- Location within Minnesota
- Location: Warsaw Township, Rice County, west of Faribault, Minnesota
- Coordinates: 44.267022°N 93.355300°W
- Basin countries: United States
- Surface area: 1,593.22 acres (2.48941 sq mi)
- Max. depth: 15 feet (4.6 m)

Cannon Lake is a lake located in Rice County, Minnesota, United States. The lake has a surface area of 1,593.22 acres and a maximum depth of 15 feet.

The lake is part of the Cannon River system that starts in Shields Lake, goes through Le Sueur and Rice counties and drains into the Mississippi River.

A survey of the lake in August 2009 showed the most predominant species of fish was the walleye. The walleyes averaged 7.3 fish per gill net with a mean weight of 2.3 pounds and a mean length of 17.7 inches.
