= Warsow =

Warsow or Wahrsow may refer to:

- Warsow (video game), also called Warfork, a multiplayer first-person shooter computer game, first publicly released on June 8, 2005
- Warsow (Stralendorf) a municipality in Ludwigslust-Parchim District, Mecklenburg-Vorpommern, Germany
- Warsow by Lake Kummerow, a municipal neighbourhood of Malchin, Mecklenburg-Vorpommern, Germany
- Warsow, a village in Wiesenaue, Havelland District, Brandenburg, Germany
- Wahrsow, a village in Schönberger Land, Nordwestmecklenburg District, Mecklenburg-Vorpommern, Germany
- Warsow, the German name of Warszewo, a municipal neighbourhood of the city of Szczecin, Poland

== See also ==
- Warsaw (disambiguation)
