= Gatchina =

Gatchina Гатчина
- Town
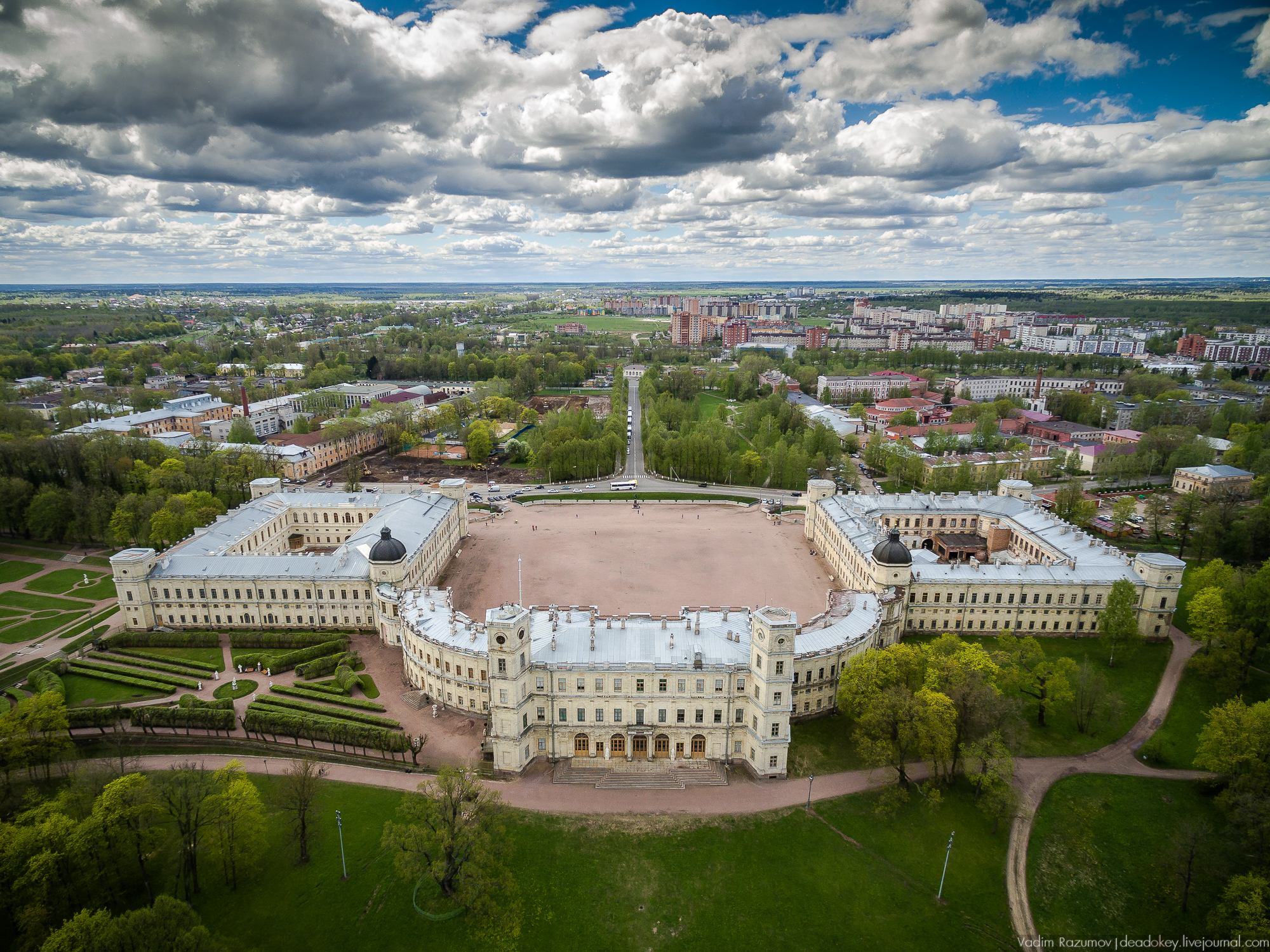
- Aerial view of the Gatchina Palace

- Flag Coat of arms
- Interactive map of Gatchina
- Location of Gatchina Gatchina (European Russia) Gatchina (Europe)
- Coordinates: 59°35′N 30°08′E
- Country: Russia
- Federal subject: Leningrad Oblast
- Administrative district: Gatchinsky District
- Settlement municipal formationSelsoviet: Gatchinskoye Settlement Municipal Formation
- First mentioned: 1499
- Town status since: 1796
- Elevation: 100 m (330 ft)

Population (2010 Census)
  - Total: 92,937
  - Estimate (2025): 91,514 (−1.5%)
  - Rank: 184th in 2010

Administrative status
  - Capital of: Gatchinsky District, Gatchinskoye Settlement Municipal Formation

Municipal status
  - Municipal district: Gatchinsky Municipal District
  - Urban settlement: Gatchinskoye Urban Settlement
  - Capital of: Gatchinsky Municipal District, Gatchinskoye Urban Settlement
- Time zone: UTC+3 (MSK)
- Postal codes: 188300-188310, 188319, 188399
- Dialing code: +7 81371
- OKTMO ID: 41618101001
- Town Day: Third Saturday in September
- Website: www.gatchina-meria.ru

Gatchina (Russian: Га́тчина, IPA: [ˈɡatːɕɪnə]) is a town and the administrative center of Gatchinsky District in Leningrad Oblast, Russia. It lies 45 kilometers (28 mi) south-southwest of St. Petersburg, along the E95 highway which links Saint Petersburg and Pskov. Population: 92,937 (2010 census); 88,420 (2002 census); 79,714 (1989 Soviet census).

Historical population
Year	Pop.	±%
1897	14,824	—
1926	16,600	+12.0%
1939	38,201	+130.1%
1959	36,725	−3.9%
1970	63,292	+72.3%
1979	75,153	+18.7%
1989	79,714	+6.1%
2002	88,420	+10.9%
2010	92,937	+5.1%
2021	94,377	+1.5%
Source: Census data

It was previously known as Khotchino, Gatchina (until February 14, 1923), Trotsk (until August 2, 1929), and Krasnogvardeysk (until January 28, 1944).

Gatchina, the largest town in Leningrad Oblast, is best known as the location of the Great Gatchina Palace, one of the main residences of the Russian Imperial Family during the 18th and 19th centuries. The historic center and Gatchina Palace are part of the UNESCO World Heritage Site's "Historic Centre of Saint Petersburg and Related Groups of Monuments". Another popular tourist attraction in Gatchina is the Prioratsky Palace.

Gatchina has placed highly in quality-of-life rankings in Russia.

== History ==
=== Early history ===
Gatchina was first documented in 1499 under the name Khotchino as a village that was part of the region of Novgorod. In the 17th century it was passed to Livonia and then to Sweden in a series of wars, until the early years of the Great Northern War at the turn of the 1700s when the area was returned to Russia. In 1703, Gatchina found itself in the southern vicinity of the new Russian capital, Saint Petersburg, which was being constructed 45 kilometers (28 mi) north at the mouth of the Neva River. Despite technically still belonging to Swedish Ingria, in 1708, Gatchina was given by Peter the Great to his sister, Natalya Alexeyevna, and after her death in 1716 Peter founded an Imperial Hospital and Apothecary there. In 1765, it became the property of Count Orlov.

=== Imperial residence ===
==== 18th century ====
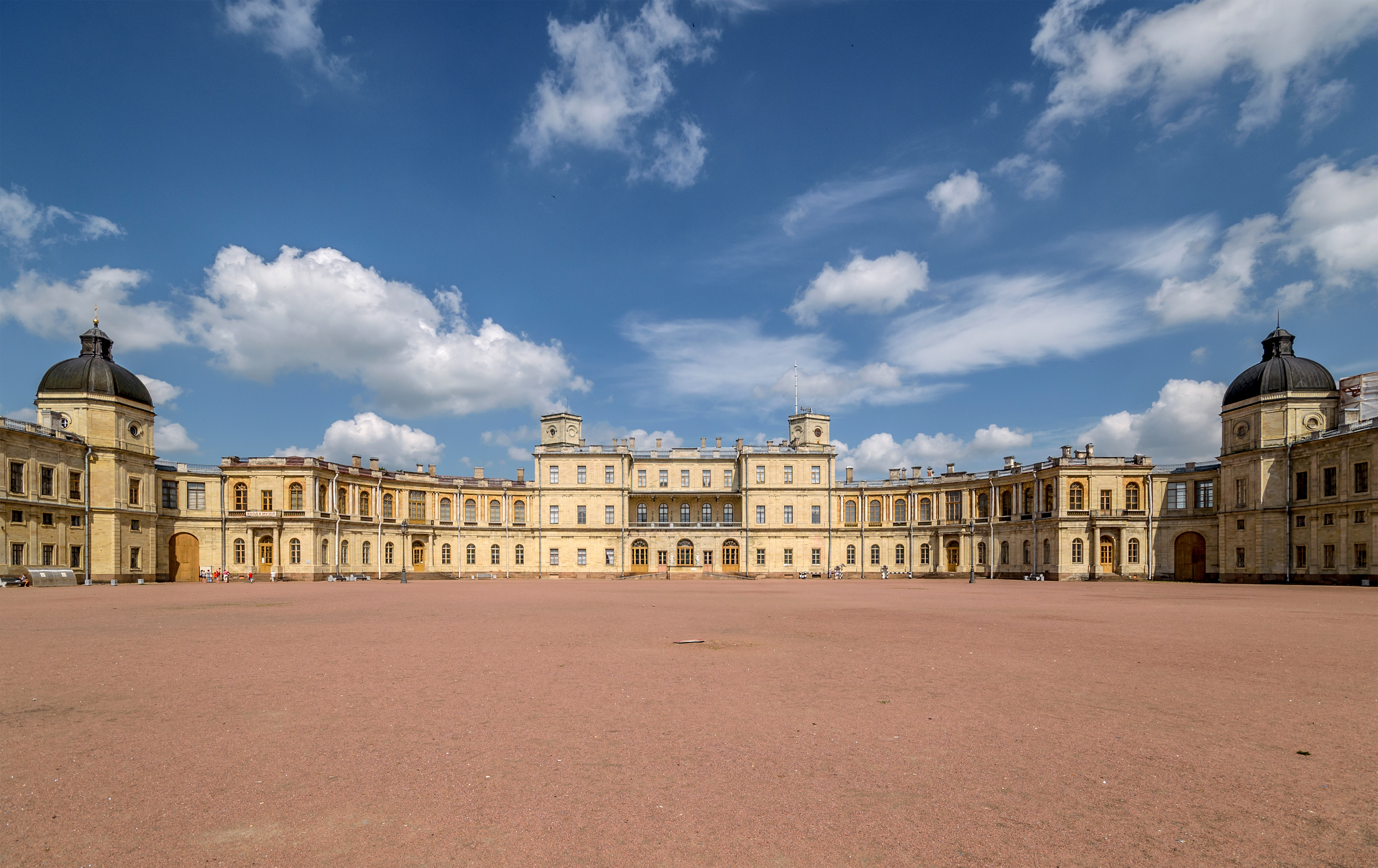
Great Gatchina Palace.

In 1765, Catherine the Great, Empress of the Russian Empire, purchased Gatchina Manor from Prince Boris Kurakin, which featured the village and a small manor. Gatchina was gifted by Catherine to one of her favorites, Count Grigory Grigoryevich Orlov, who reportedly organized the assassination of Tsar Peter III three years earlier, resulting in her becoming empress. Between 1766 and 1788, Count Orlov built the massive Great Gatchina Palace in place of the original manor, with 600 rooms, an extensive English landscape park over 7 square kilometers (2.7 sq mi), with an adjacent zoo and a horse farm. A triumphal arch was erected to a design by the architect of Gatchina Palace, Antonio Rinaldi, forming a monumental entrance. Upon Orlov's death in 1783, Gatchina Palace was bought by Catherine from his heirs, and given to her son Grand Duke Pavel Petrovich, the future Tsar Paul I. During his ownership, Paul made alterations to the palace, but also began developing the village of Gatchina into a town using experience from his travels around Europe. After ascending to the throne, Paul granted Gatchina the status of Imperial City, an honorary designation for towns that possessed a royal palace. Gatchina Palace was expanded and altered numerous times by its subsequent imperial owners, with the addition of Rococo interiors designed by Rinaldi and Vincenzo Brenna, and executed by Italian stucco workers and Russian craftsmen.

==== 19th century ====
In 1854, a railroad connecting Gatchina and Saint Petersburg was opened, and the territory of Gatchina was expanded with several villages in the vicinity being incorporated into the city. The following year Gatchina Palace came under the ownership of Tsar Alexander II, who used it as his second residence. Alexander built a hunting village south of Gatchina into a retreat where he and his guests could enjoy the unspoiled wilderness of northwestern Russia. Following the assassination of Alexander II in 1881, Gatchina Palace was passed to his shaken son, the new Tsar Alexander III, who was advised that he and his family would be safer in Gatchina as opposed to at the Winter Palace in Saint Petersburg. Alexander spent most of his life at Gatchina Palace, which became known as "The Citadel of Autocracy" after the Tsar's reactionary policies. Here he signed decrees, held diplomatic receptions, theatrical performances, masquerades and costumed balls, and other events and entertainment. Alexander III introduced some technological modernizations new to Russia at the Gatchina Palace, such as indoor heaters, electric lights, a telephone network, non-freezing water pipes and a modern sewage system. His son, the future Tsar Nicholas II and the last Russian Tsar, spent his youth in the Gatchina Palace, although he and his family would make Tsarskoye Selo his home. His mother, Dowager Empress Maria Feodorovna, widow of Alexander III, was the patron of the city of Gatchina, the palace and its parks.

=== 20th century ===
Gatchina was honored as the best-kept city of Russia at the 1900 World's Fair in Paris (Exposition Universelle). The quality of life, education, medical services, and public safety in Gatchina were recognized as the best, and it was recommended as an example for other cities in Russia. In 1910, one of the first airfields in Russia was established in Gatchina, with the city becoming one of the first centers of aviation and engine technology in Russia. The pilot Pyotr Nesterov was trained at the Gatchina airfield and made his first long-distance flight from Gatchina to Kiev. Gatchina Palace remained one of the official imperial residences of Tsar Nicholas II, who was presiding over annual military parades and celebrations of the Imperial Russian Army garrisons, stationed in Gatchina until 1917.

==== World War I ====
During World War I, major medical hospitals in Gatchina were visited by the Tsar Nicholas II and Empress Maria Fyodorovna, the mother of Nicholas II, his wife the Empress Alexandra Fyodorovna, as well as their daughters Grand Duchess Olga, Grand Duchess Tatiana, Grand Duchess Maria, and Grand Duchess Anastasia.

In March 1917, the Russian Empire collapsed upon the abdication of Nicholas II following the February Revolution, leading to a decline in Gatchina's importance as the town and its palace became state property of the Russian Provisional Government, who converted it to a museum.

==== Russian Civil War ====
Shortly afterwards, the Bolsheviks seized power in the October Revolution and the outbreak of the Russian Civil War followed. It saw Gatchina loyal to the White Movement, and the palace was visited by President Alexander Kerensky of the deposed Russian Provisional Government on October 27, 1917. During Kerensky's visit, fighting broke out in Gatchina between detachments of the Red Guards and Cossack units of General Pyotr Krasnov. The Reds won the battle, which had avoided the palace, and on November 1, they held a rally outside the palace in the main square, where Pavel Dybenko encouraged the Cossack units stationed in the palace to surrender and not to oppose the Red authorities. Kerensky left Gatchina Palace that night, and it was occupied by Red troops the following day.

==== Interwar period ====
In May 1918, the museum was re-opened by the Reds "for the victorious popular masses of the Russian Revolution" in Gatchina. From 1918 to 1941, the Gatchina Palace and parks were open to public as a national museum. On February 14, 1923, Gatchina was renamed Trotsk (Russian: Троцк) by the new Soviet authorities, after Leon Trotsky. After Joseph Stalin became General Secretary of the Russian Communist Party (b), Trotsky was gradually exiled (and later killed on Stalin's orders), and the town was renamed Krasnogvardeysk (Красногварде́йск, Red Guard City) on August 2, 1929.

==== World War II ====
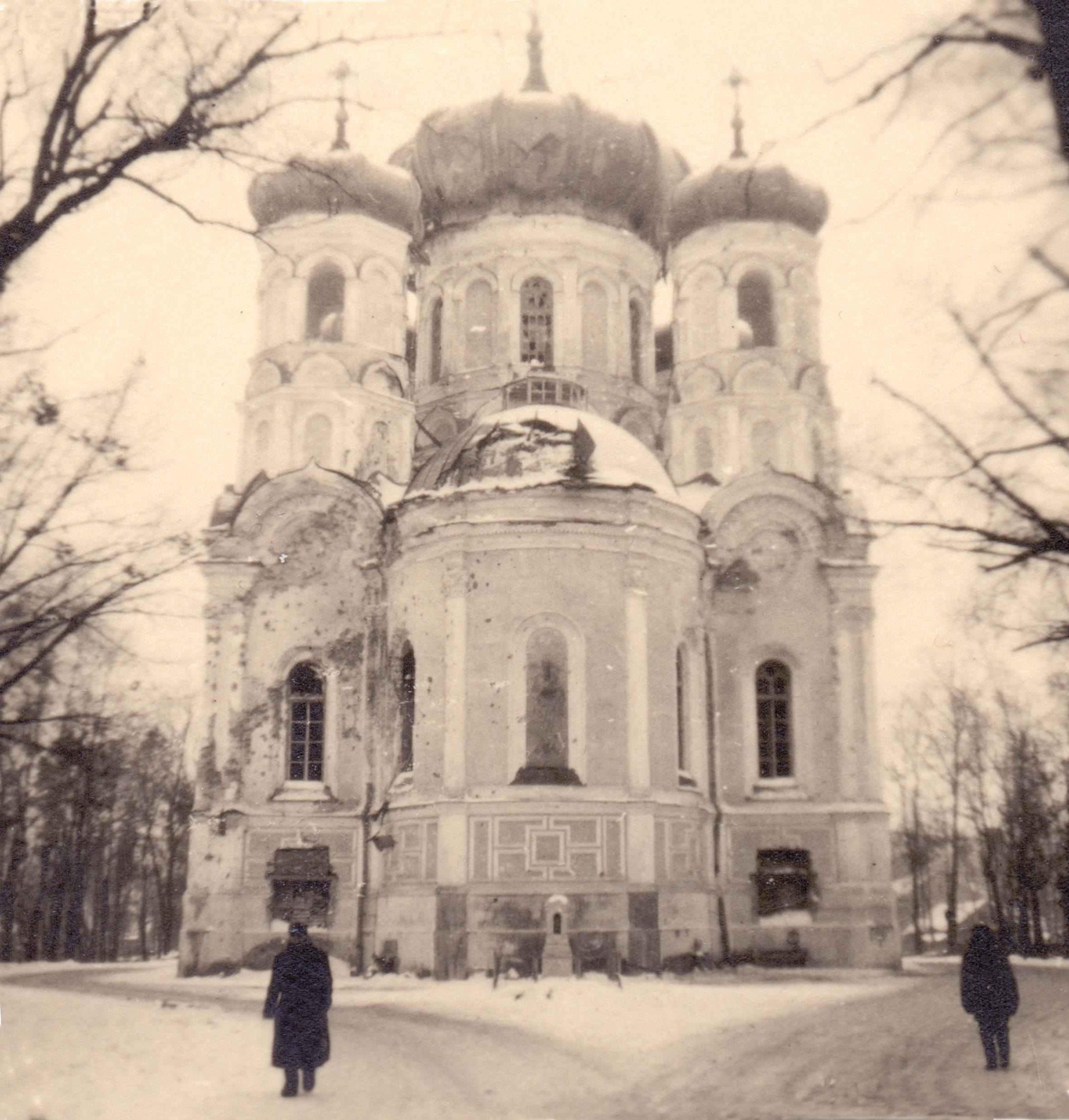
Damaged Saint Paul Cathedral in Gatchina during German occupation; the visible weariness is due to both heavy fighting and neglect showed by the Soviet government in the preceding decades

Gatchina was occupied by Nazi Germany from Saturday, September 13, 1941, following the German invasion of Russia during World War II. The Germans renamed the town Lindemannstadt, in honor of the Wehrmacht general Georg Lindemann, and looted much of the Gatchina Palace for its collections of art. On January 26, 1944, the Germans abandoned Lindemannstadt during their retreat, setting fire to Gatchina Palace and vandalizing much of the park. The town was quickly retaken by the Red Army, and two days later it was renamed back to its original pre-Soviet name, Gatchina.

==== Rebuilding ====
After the war, Gatchina was rebuilt to Soviet standards, and became home to the Petersburg Institute of Nuclear Physics. The extent of the Gatchina Palace's devastation was extraordinary, and initially was considered irreparable damage. Restoration works continued for over 60 years, and some pieces of the art collection were recovered from safe keeping and returned to Gatchina. Today, one section of the Gatchina Palace is partially completed and certain state rooms and the Arsenal Halls are now open to the public. Other areas of the palace, including those of Tsar Alexander III, remain closed and unrestored.

In 1990, shortly before the dissolution of the Soviet Union, Gatchina Palace and surviving buildings in Gatchina's historic center became UNESCO World Heritage Sites, as part of the wider Saint Petersburg and Related Groups of Monuments. In 1999, Gatchina was awarded in the Most Comfortable City of Russia, a quality of life competition for Russian towns and cities, being ranked first in Category III, the category for cities with a population of under 100,000. In 2010, Gatchina's status as an Historical city of Russia was revoked.

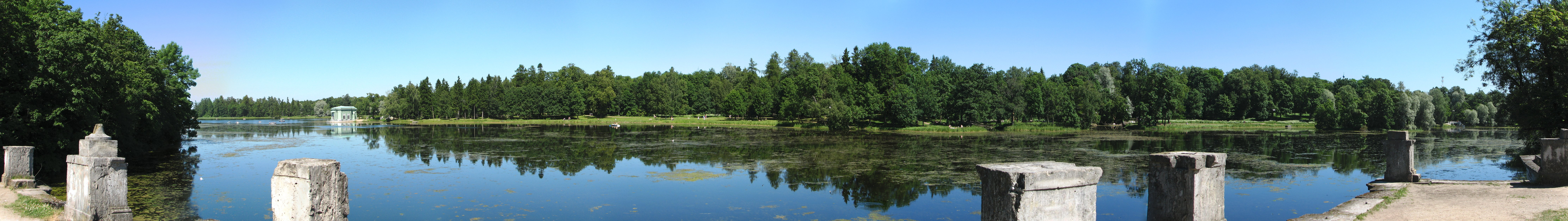
Panorama of the view from the piers at Gatchina Palace Park.

== Name ==
The town has notably been known under various names during its history. As common with larger urban areas under the Soviet Union, Gatchina was renamed to reflect the changed ideals of the government. This first came in honouring Leon Trotsky. However, with the feud between Trotsky and Stalin at a high this name was to become problematic. Thus, the city was renamed again in honour of the Soviet troops. Unlike other regions that underwent this process, Gatchina has a more complex history leading to multiple variations.

Caption
Name	Period	Named For	Governing Power
Khotchino	1499–1700s	Lust for authority or noble status	Novgorod Republic; Livonia (Sweden) Swedish Empire
Khotchino	1700s–1917	Lust for authority or noble status	Tsardom of Russia; Russian Empire
Khotchino	1917	Lust for authority or noble status	Provisional Government; Whites; Soviet Union
Khotchino	1917–1923	Lust for authority or noble status	Soviet Union
Trotsk	1923–1929	Leon Trotsky	Soviet Union
Krasnogvardeysk	1929–1941	"Red Guard" City	Soviet Union
Lindemannstadt	1941–1944	Georg Lindemann	Nazi Germany
Gatchina	1944–	Variant spelling of historic "Khotchino"	Soviet Union (Russia) Russian Federation

== Administrative and municipal divisions ==
Within the framework of administrative divisions, Gatchina serves as the administrative center of Gatchinsky District. As an administrative division, it is incorporated within Gatchinsky District as Gatchinskoye Settlement Municipal Formation. As a municipal division, Gatchinskoye Settlement Municipal Formation is incorporated within Gatchinsky Municipal District as Gatchinskoye Urban Settlement.

== Economy ==
=== Industry ===
In Gatchina, there are several enterprises related to timber industry, including a paper mill, and to food industry.

=== Transportation ===
Map of two railway lines to Gatchina

Gatchina is an important railway node. One railway, running north to south, connects the Baltiysky railway station in St. Petersburg with Dno and Nevel. Within the town limits, suburban trains in this direction stop at the platform of Tatyanino and the station of Gatchina-Varshavskaya. Another railway, also from the Baltiysky railway station, arrives to Gatchina from the northwest and has two stops, Mariyenburg and Gatchina-Passazhirskaya-Baltiyskaya. Yet another railway runs south of the town center from east to west and connects Mga via Ulyanovka with Volosovo. The railway station on this line in Gatchina is Gatchina-Tovarnaya-Baltiyskaya.

The M20 Highway connecting St. Petersburg and Pskov, crosses Gatchina from north to south. South of Gatchina, it crosses the A120 Highway, which encircles St. Petersburg. A paved road connects Gatchina with Kingisepp via Volosovo. There are also local roads.

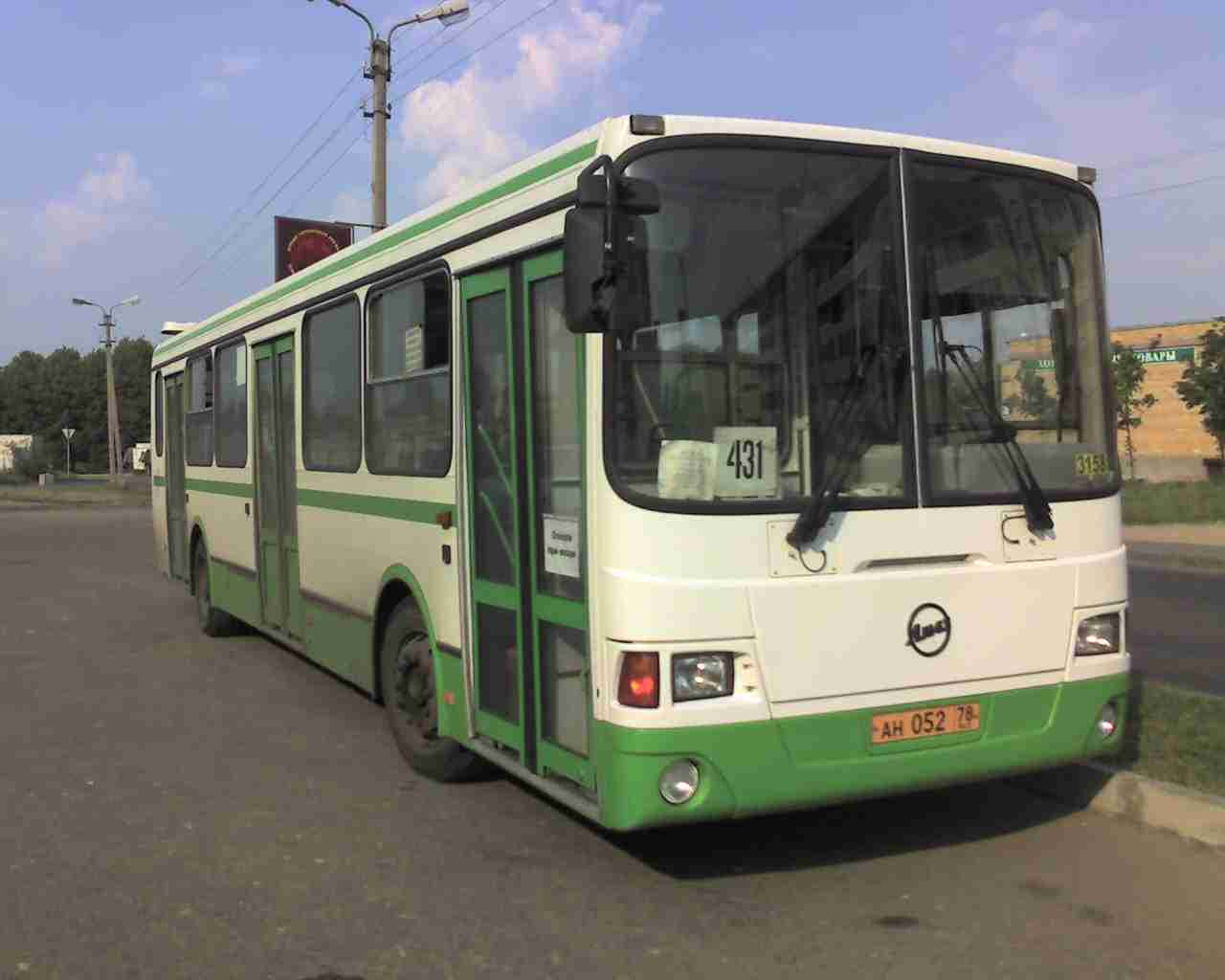
LiAZ-5256 on a Gatchina route

=== Science ===
Gatchina is the site of the Petersburg Nuclear Physics Institute.

== Twin towns – sister cities ==
Gatchina is twinned with:

- Eskilstuna, Sweden
- Ettlingen, Germany
- Coatbridge, United Kingdom
- Chișinău, Moldova
