= Warsaw railway station =

Warsaw railway station may refer to

- Warsaw station (Indiana), a former railway station in Warsaw, Indiana
- Warszawa Centralna railway station, the main railway station in Warsaw, Poland
- Warszawa Wileńska railway station, a railway terminal in east Warsaw
- Warszawa Wschodnia railway station, a major passenger station in east Warsaw
- Warszawa Zachodnia station, a railway and long-distance bus station in west Warsaw
- Varshavsky railway station, a former railway station in Saint Petersburg, Russia
- Varshavsky railway station (Gatchina), a railway station in Gatchina, Russia
