= Warsaw, Minnesota =

Unincorporated community in Minnesota, US

Warsaw
- Census-designated place (CDP) and Unincorporated community
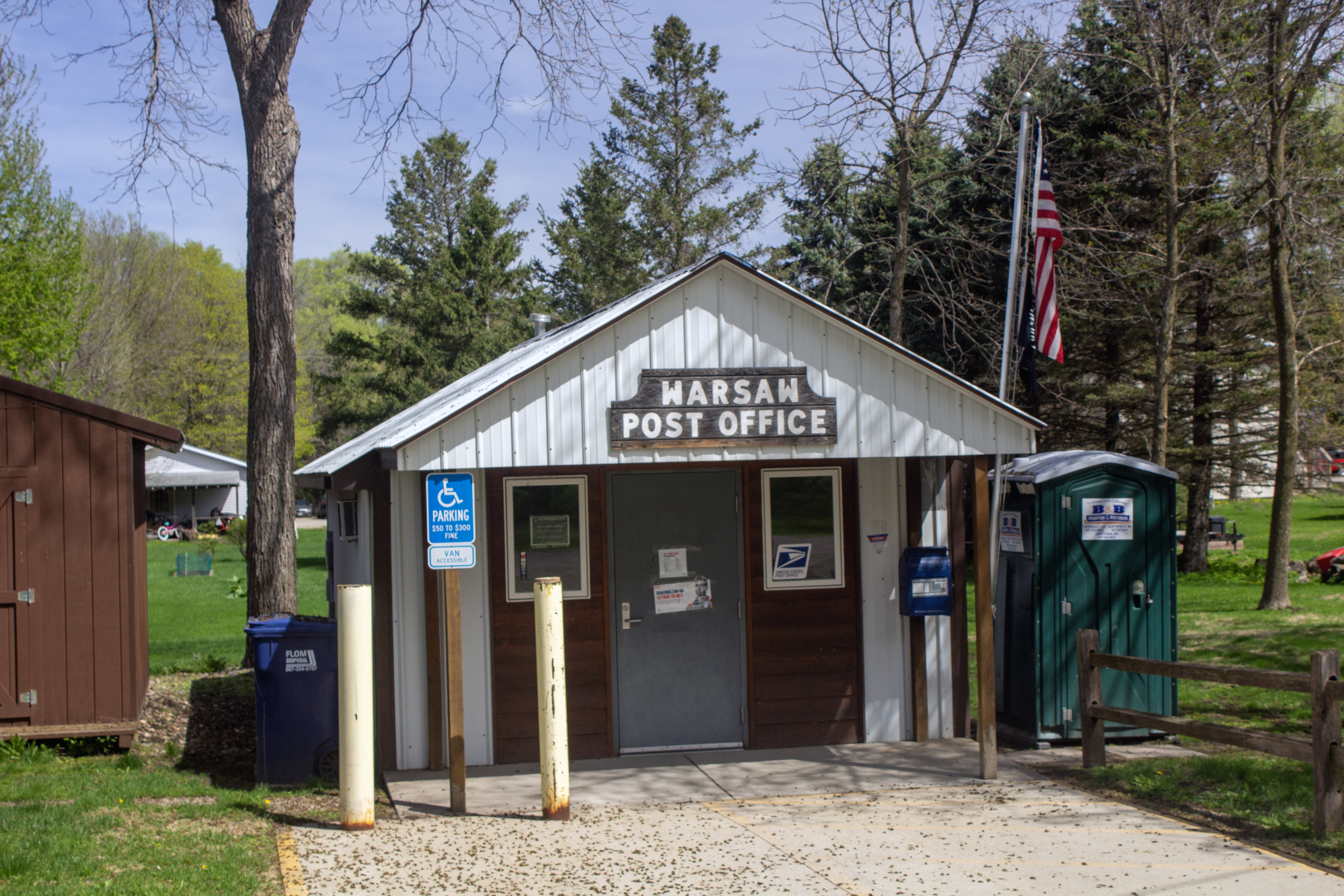
- Warsaw Post office

- Location within Minnesota
- Coordinates: 44°14′58″N 93°23′38″W
- Country: United States
- State: Minnesota
- County: Rice County
- Township: Warsaw Township

Area
  - Total: 1.90 sq mi (4.93 km^{2})
  - Land: 0.86 sq mi (2.24 km^{2})
  - Water: 1.04 sq mi (2.70 km^{2})
- Elevation: 1,001 ft (305 m)

Population (2020)
  - Total: 644
  - Density: 745.6/sq mi (287.89/km^{2})
- Time zone: UTC-6 (Central (CST))
  - Summer (DST): UTC-5 (CDT)
- ZIP code: 55087
- Area code: 507
- GNIS feature ID: 653792

Warsaw is an unincorporated community and census-designated place (CDP) in Warsaw Township, Rice County, Minnesota, United States. As of the 2020 census, Warsaw had a population of 644.

The community is located east of Morristown and west of Faribault.

Warsaw is located at the junction of State Highway 60 (MN 60) and Rice County Road 13 (Farwell Avenue) on the west side of Cannon Lake.

== Demographics ==
Historical population
Census	Pop.	Note	%±
2020	644		—
U.S. Decennial Census

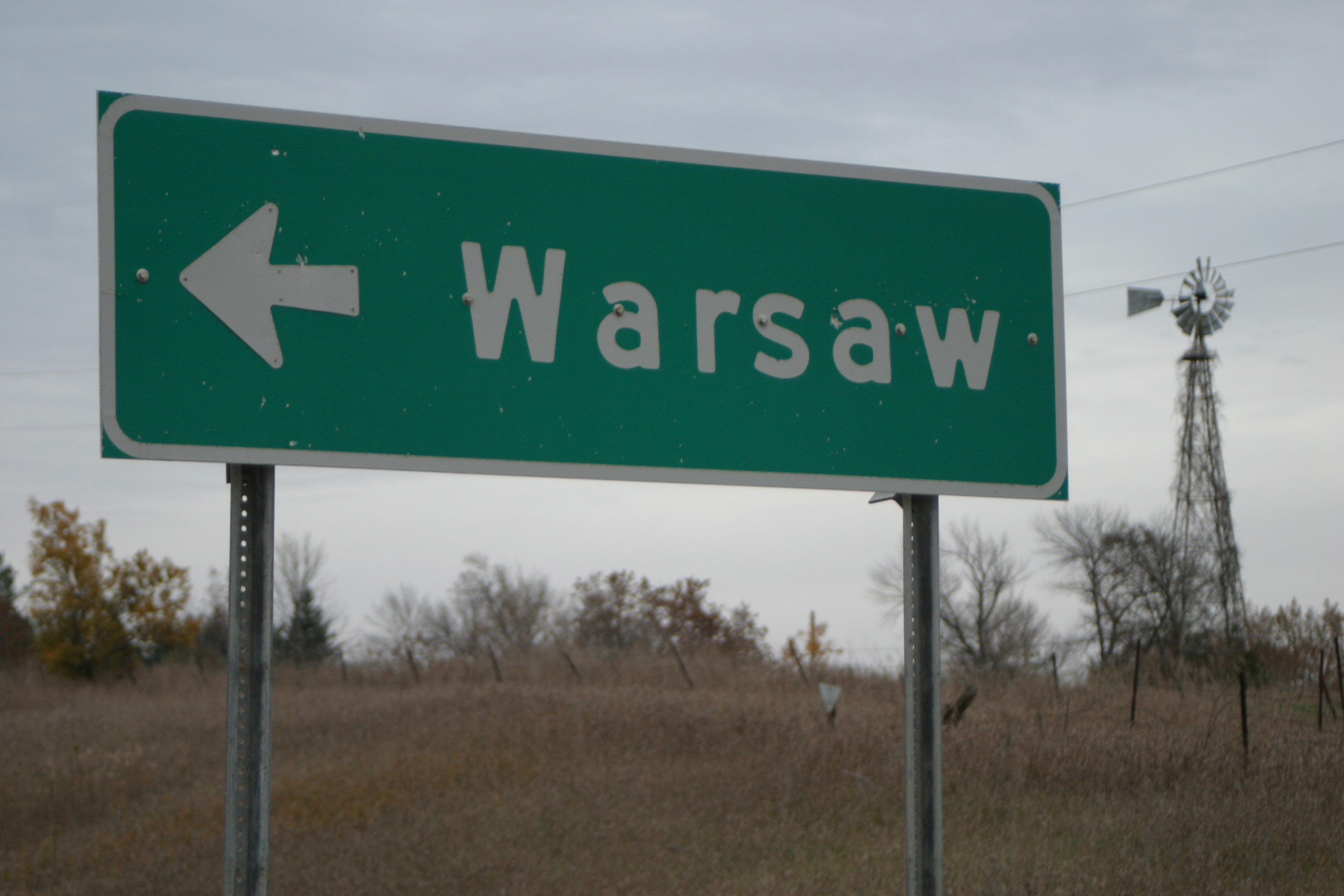
Highway sign

== Education ==
Most of the CDP is in Faribault Public Schools. A portion in the west is in Waterville-Elysian-Morristown Public School District.
