= Varsovia =

Varsovia (Breton, Latin, Romanian and Spanish - Warsaw (the capital city of Poland)) may refer to:

- Varsovia (train), a train named after Warsaw
- Warsaw, the city itself
