= Warsaw Voivodeship =

Warsaw Voivodeship may refer to:

- Masovian Voivodeship (1526–1795)
- Warsaw Voivodeship (1919–1939)
- Warsaw Voivodeship (1944–1975)
- Warsaw Voivodeship (1975–1998)
- Masovian Voivodeship, with capital in Warsaw, created in 1999

== See also ==
- Voivodeships of Poland
- Warsaw
