= ORP Warszawa =

Three ships of the Polish Navy have been named ORP Warszawa, after the capital city of Warsaw:

- ORP Warszawa (1920), was a monitor of the Riverine Flotilla of the Polish Navy, launched in 1920 and scuttled in 1939. She was raised by the Soviets and commissioned as Vitebsk (Витебск). She was scuttled on 18 September 1941 near Kiev, raised in August 1944, and then scrapped.
- ORP Warszawa (1970), was a Kotlin-class destroyer which was launched in 1956 and served in the Soviet Navy as Spravedlivyy. She was commissioned into the Polish Navy in 1970 and decommissioned in 1986.
- ORP Warszawa (1988), was a modified Kashin-class destroyer launched in 1968 as the Soviet Smelyi (Смелый). She was purchased from the USSR in 1988 and decommissioned in 2003.

== See also ==
- SS Susana, a cargo steamship that between 1920 and 1923 was called Warszawa
