= Treaty of Warsaw =

Treaty of Warsaw may refer to:

- Treaty of Warsaw (1705), a Polish-Lithuanian–Swedish alliance during the Great Northern War
- Treaty of Warsaw (1717), imposing the merger of Poland and Saxony, under the supervision of Russia
- Treaty of Warsaw (1745), an alliance between Britain, Austria, the Dutch Republic and Poland-Saxony agreeing to uphold the Pragmatic Sanction
- Treaty of Warsaw (1768) (Polish: Traktat Warszawski), granting rights to religious minorities
- Treaty of Warsaw (1773), treaty of session between Poland and Austria, provided that the new frontier of Poland should follow a petty stream called the Podhorze river which was later found to have no existence; treaty between Poland and Prussia: Frederick II guaranteed the free exercise of religion for the Catholics of the annexed provinces
- Treaty of Warsaw (1809)
- Treaty of Warsaw (1849), between Russia and Austria
- Treaty of Warsaw (1920), between Poland and the Ukrainian National Republic during the Polish–Soviet War
- Treaty of Warsaw (1955), also known as the Warsaw Pact
- Treaty of Warsaw (1970), agreement between West Germany and the People's Republic of Poland, re-establishing and normalizing bilateral relations, and provisionally recognizing Poland's western border
- Treaty of Warsaw (1990), Polish–German border agreement finalizing the Oder–Neisse line
