= Warsaw Township, Hancock County, Illinois =

Warsaw Township
- Township
- Township hall and community center

- Location in Hancock County

- Hancock County's location in Illinois
- Coordinates: 40°21′10″N 91°25′38″W
- Country: United States
- State: Illinois
- County: Hancock
- Established: November 6, 1849

Area
  - Total: 7.47 sq mi (19.3 km^{2})
  - Land: 6.52 sq mi (16.9 km^{2})
  - Water: 0.95 sq mi (2.5 km^{2}) 12.71%
- Elevation: 627 ft (191 m)

Population (2020)
  - Total: 1,510
  - Density: 232/sq mi (89.4/km^{2})
- Time zone: UTC-6 (CST)
  - Summer (DST): UTC-5 (CDT)
- ZIP codes: 62330, 62354, 62358
- FIPS code: 17-067-78955

Warsaw Township is one of twenty-four townships in Hancock County, Illinois, USA. As of the 2020 census, its population was 1,510 and it contained 762 housing units. Since November 15, 1855, the township has been co-extensive with the city of Warsaw.

== Geography ==
According to the 2021 census gazetteer files, Warsaw Township has a total area of 7.47 square miles (19.35 km^{2}), of which 6.52 square miles (16.89 km^{2}) (or 87.29%) is land and 0.95 square miles (2.46 km^{2}) (or 12.71%) is water.

=== Cemeteries ===
The township contains these three cemeteries: Catholic, Lutheran and Oakland.

=== Major highways ===
- Illinois Route 9
- Illinois Route 96

== Demographics ==
As of the 2020 census there were 1,510 people, 691 households, and 435 families residing in the township. The population density was 202.17 inhabitants per square mile (78.06/km^{2}). There were 762 housing units at an average density of 102.02 per square mile (39.39/km^{2}). The racial makeup of the township was 94.50% White, 0.26% African American, 0.46% Native American, 0.73% Asian, 0.07% Pacific Islander, 0.00% from other races, and 3.97% from two or more races. Hispanic or Latino of any race were 1.26% of the population.

There were 691 households, out of which 27.50% had children under the age of 18 living with them, 52.24% were married couples living together, 7.81% had a female householder with no spouse present, and 37.05% were non-families. 31.00% of all households were made up of individuals, and 19.00% had someone living alone who was 65 years of age or older. The average household size was 2.32 and the average family size was 2.91.

The township's age distribution consisted of 24.9% under the age of 18, 3.3% from 18 to 24, 21.1% from 25 to 44, 29% from 45 to 64, and 21.9% who were 65 years of age or older. The median age was 45.4 years. For every 100 females, there were 85.4 males. For every 100 females age 18 and over, there were 81.3 males.

The median income for a household in the township was $53,920, and the median income for a family was $73,092. Males had a median income of $53,472 versus $25,859 for females. The per capita income for the township was $31,066. About 5.3% of families and 10.1% of the population were below the poverty line, including 14.1% of those under age 18 and 6.0% of those age 65 or over.

Historical population
Census	Pop.	Note	%±
1990	1,882		—
2000	1,793		−4.7%
2010	1,607		−10.4%
2020	1,510		−6.0%
U.S. Decennial Census

== School districts ==
- Nauvoo–Colusa Community Unit School District 325
- Warsaw Community Unit School District 316

== Political districts ==
- Illinois's 18th congressional district
- State House District 94
- State Senate District 47
