= Wausau =

Wausau may refer to:

== Places ==
- Wausau, Florida, town
- Wausau (town), Wisconsin, town
- Wausau, Wisconsin, city

== Other uses ==
- Wausau Daily Herald
- Wausau Downtown Airport, a city-owned public-use airport in Wausau, Wisconsin
- Wausau East High School, in Wausau, Wisconsin
- Wausau West High School, in Wausau, Wisconsin
