= Gatchina-Varshavskaya railway station =

Railway station in Gatchina, Russia

Gatchina-Varshavskaya Гатчина-Варшавская
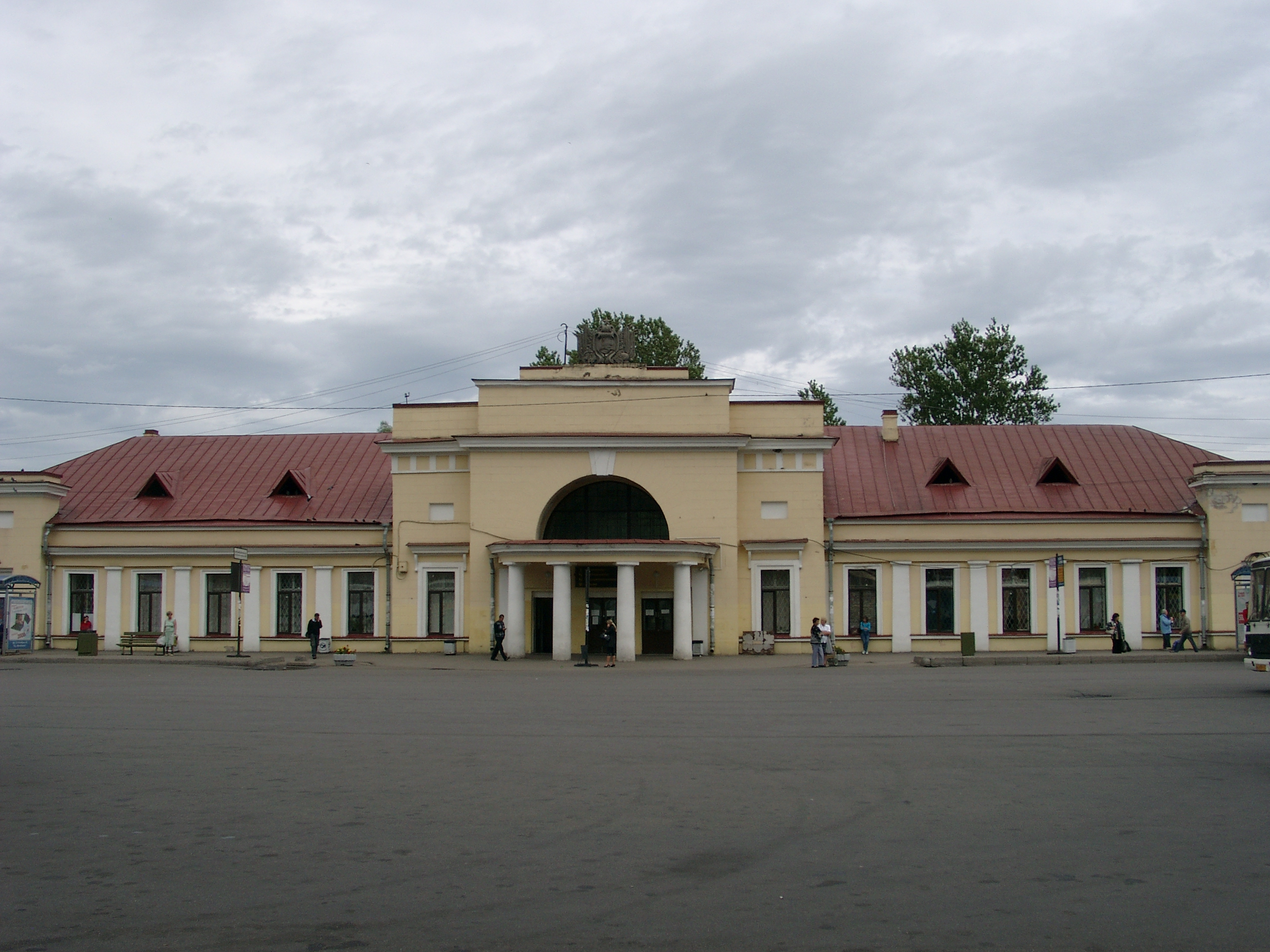
- The station building in 2010

General information
- Location: 1, Ploshchad' Varshavskogo Vokzala; Gatchina; Gatchinsky District, Leningrad Oblast; Russia
- Coordinates: 59°33′12″N 30°08′00″E
- Owner: Russian Railways
- Platforms: 2 side platforms
- Tracks: 2

Construction
- Structure type: at-grade
- Architect: David Petrovich Byryshkin
- Architectural style: Stalinist

History
- Opened: 31 October [N.S. 12 November] 1853.
Location
- Location within European Russia Location within Leningrad Oblast

Varshavsky station (Russian: Варша́вский вокза́л, Varshavsky vokzal, English: Warsaw station) is one of two railway stations serving the town of Gatchina in Leningrad Oblast, Russia. The name of the station derives from its location on the historic Saint Petersburg–Warsaw railway, whereas the other station in the town, the Baltiysky station, derives its name from its location on the historic Baltic railway.

The station is situated in the southern part of the town at the intersection of Karl Marx Street and Chkalov Street, close to the park of the Prioratsky Palace. It is located on the Saint Petersburg–Luga and Saint Petersburg–Ivangorod lines. All suburban trains passing through the station stop here. The bus terminal for most city and suburban bus routes is located near the station.

== History ==
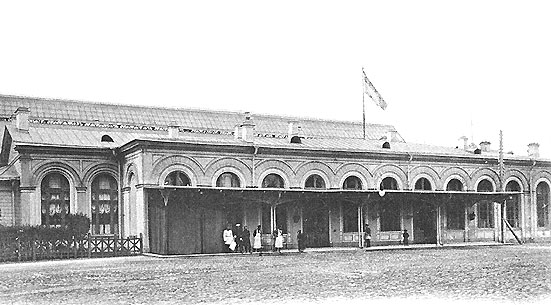
Street facade of the original station building of the Varshavsky railway station photographed in the early 20th century.

The station opened in 1853 as the first section of the Saint Petersburg–Warsaw railway with a length of 41 versts (45 km (28 mi)) was completed between Saint Petersburg and the then imperial residential town of Gatchina. Daily scheduled train service on the section started on 31 October [N.S. 12 November] 1853.

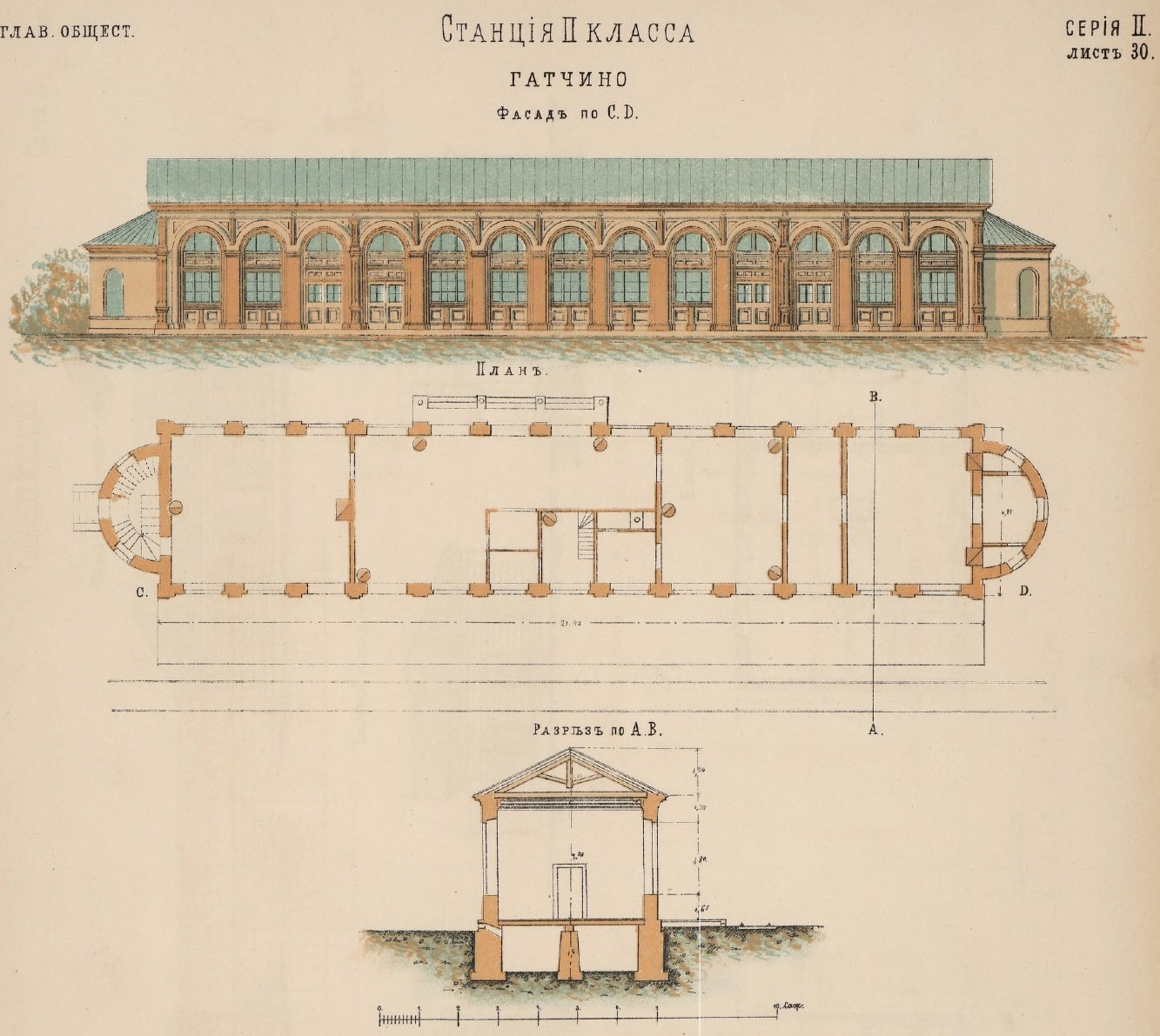
Architectural drawing of the facade, floor plan, and cross-section of the station building, 1872.

The station building was completed in 1858 to designs by the architect Pyotr Onufrievich Salmonovich. It was an elongated pavilion with arched windows and doors. The station building contained facilities for the Russian imperial family which were separated from the ticket hall and the waiting rooms of the 1st, 2nd and 3rd classes by a hallway.

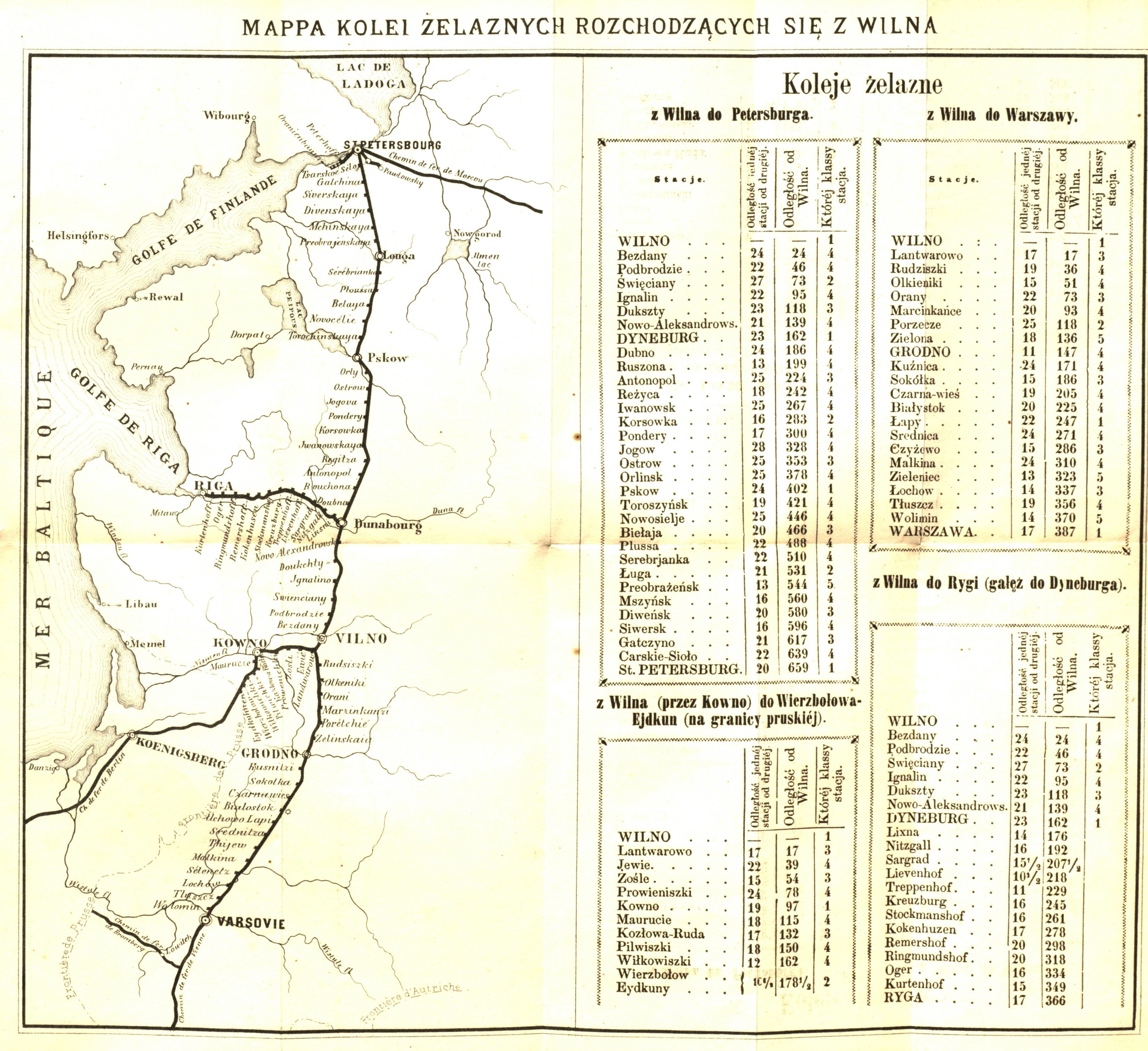
Map of the Saint Petersburg–Warsaw railway in 1862.

In December 1857, the railway line was continued beoynd Gatchina, as the next section from Gatchina to Luga was opened. The entire railway line between Saint Petersburg and Warsaw was completed and operations began in 1862.

Map of the railways lines and locations of the two railway stations in Gatchina.

In 1870, the Varshavsky railway station became a railway junction as the Baltic Railway Company opened the Baltic railway which connected the Baltic Sea ports of Reval (now Tallinn) and Baltischport (now Paldiski) with Saint Petersburg as well as Tosno on the Saint Petersburg–Moscow railway. A branch line was built which connected the Varshavsky station with the Baltic railway line which crossed the tracks of the Saint Petersburg–Warsaw railway line just south of the station.

In 1888, a metal canopy spanning the passenger platforms was constructed to a design by the engineer Felix Stanislavovich Yasinsky.

In 1895, the station was nationalized along with the Saint Petersburg–Warsaw Railway Company. On 1 January 1907, the Saint Petersburg–Warsaw Railway Company, along with the Baltic and Pskov–Riga Railway companies were merged to form the Northwestern Railways. And in 1929, the sections of the former Northwestern Railway, which remained within the borders of the RSFSR after the collapse of the Russian Empire, were merged with the October Railway.

Destroyed during the Second World War, the station building was rebuilt in typical Stalinist style to designs by the architect David Petrovich Byryshkin.

The station underwent a major renovation in the 2000s.

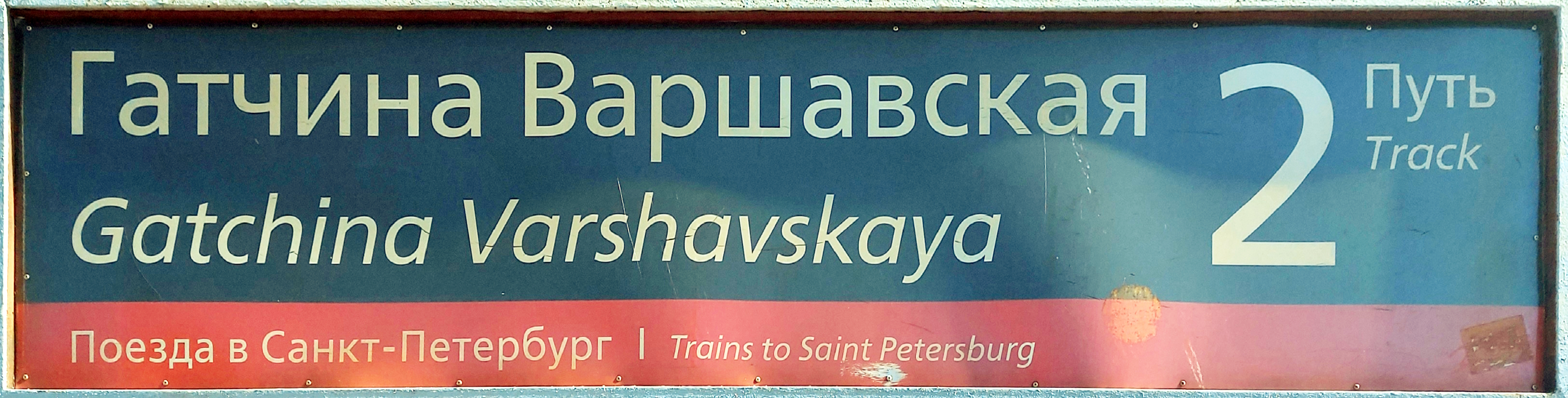
Signpost of track 2 of the Gatchina-Varshavskaya railway station

== Gallery ==
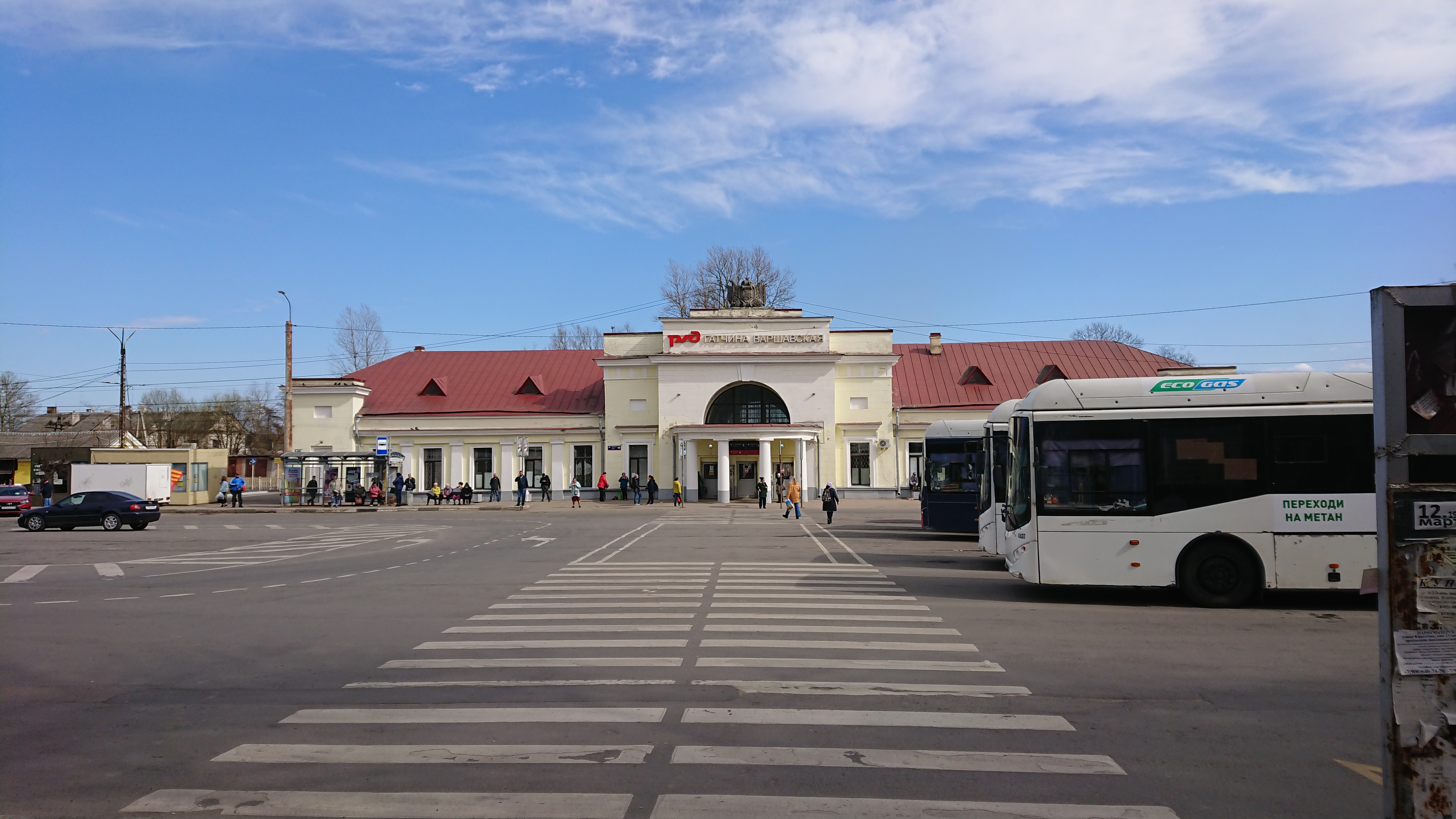
The station forecourt in 2021

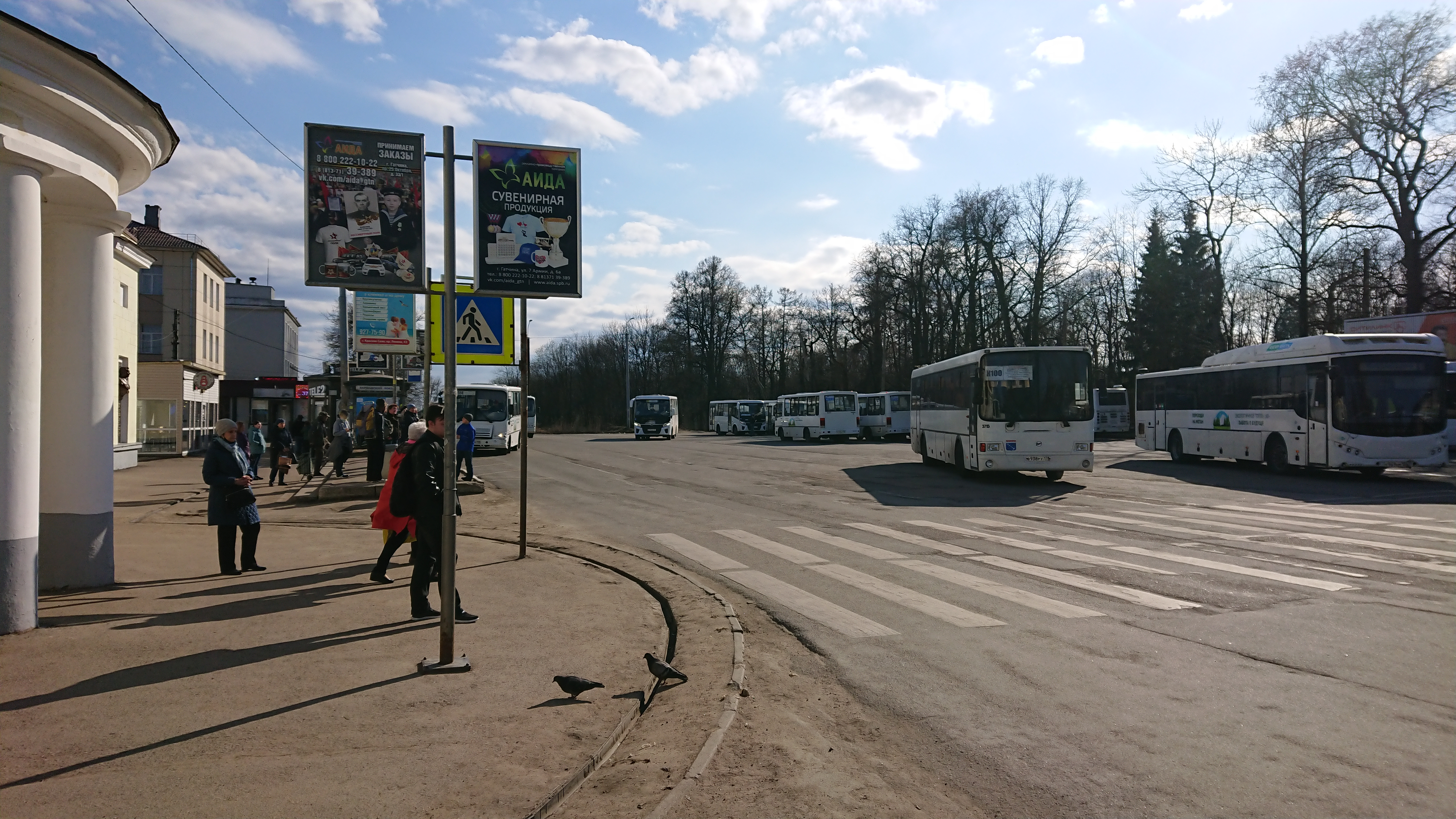
The station forecourt in 2021

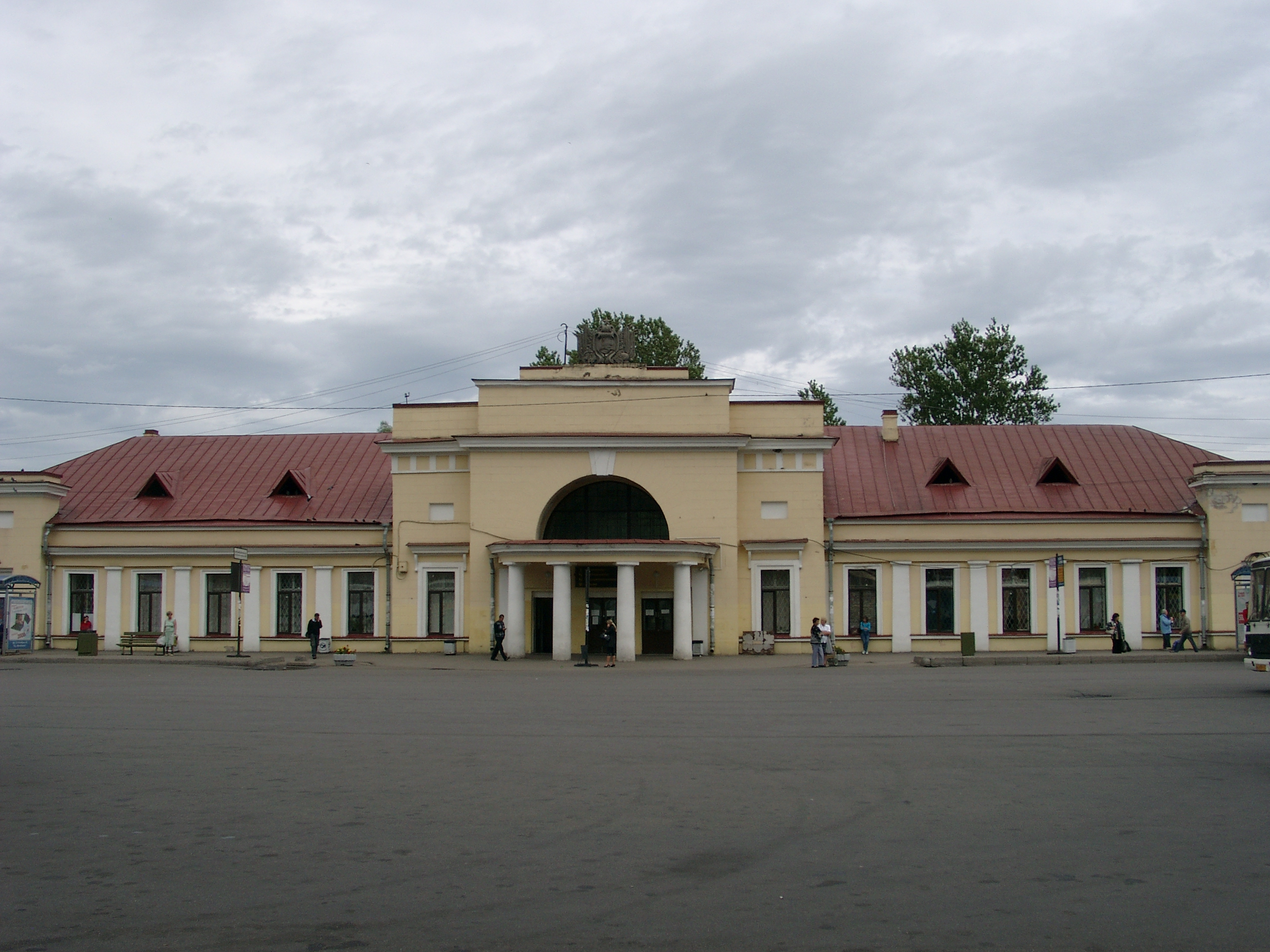
The station building in 2010

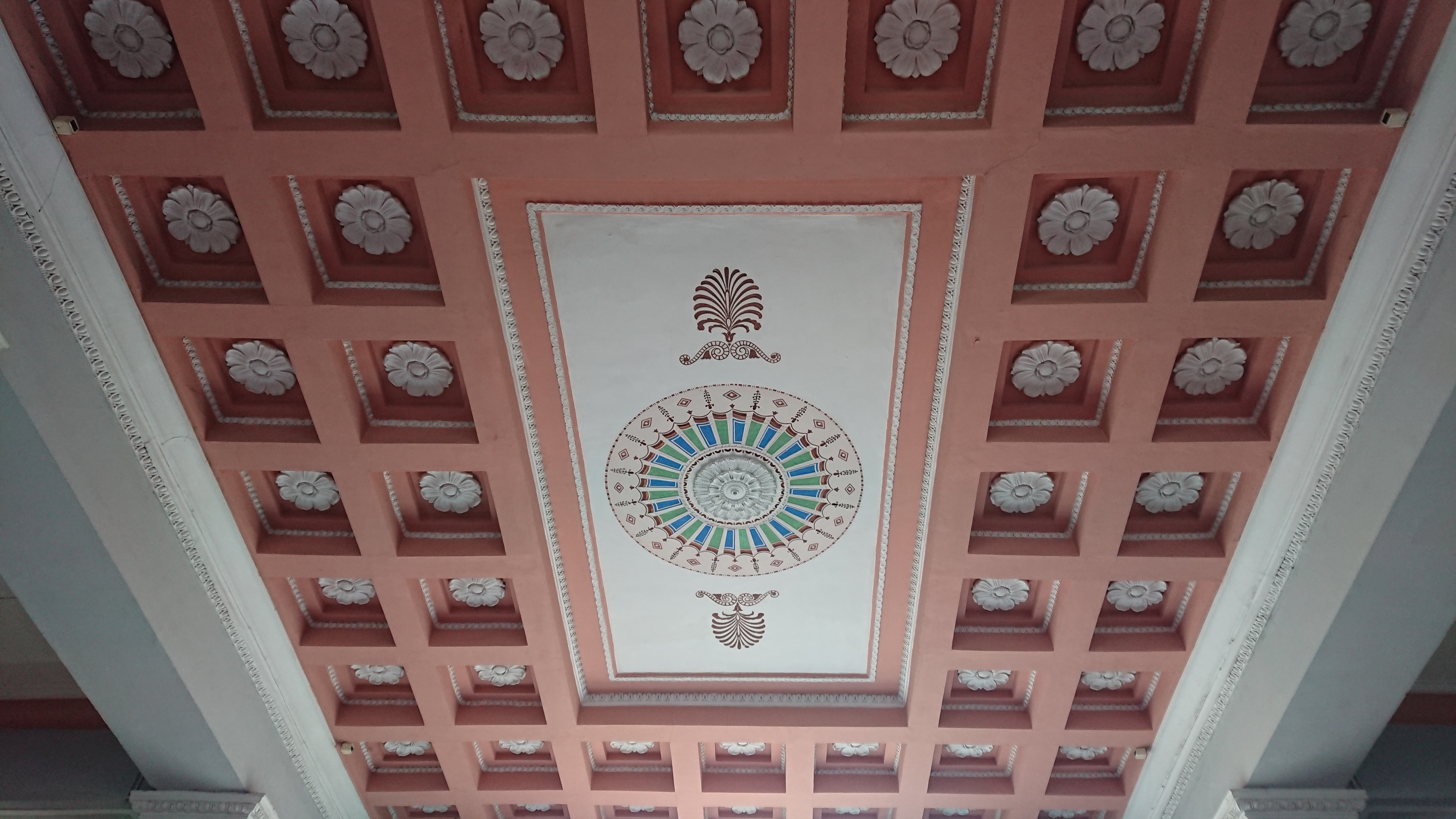
Ceiling decoration of the station building

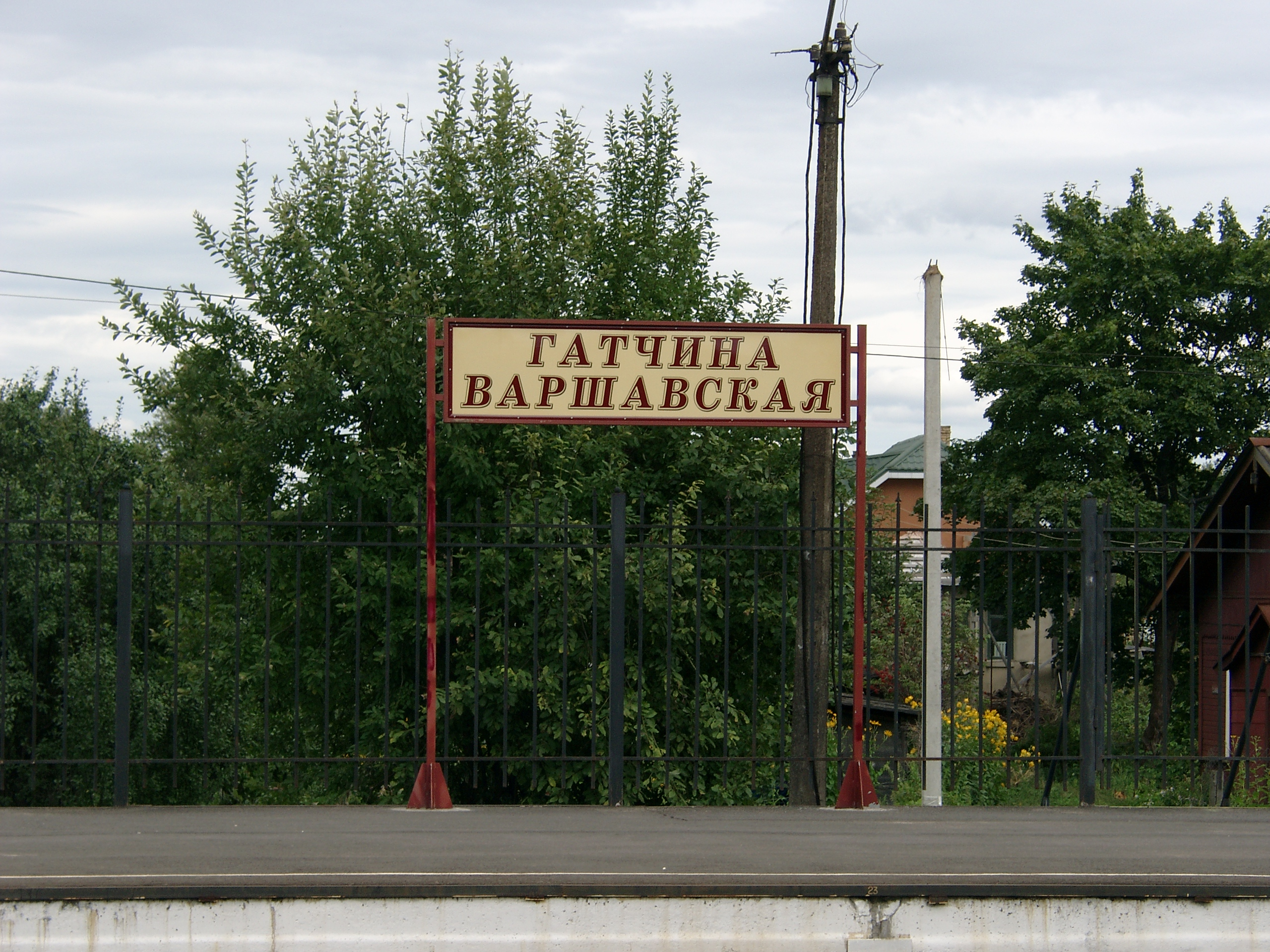
Platform sign of the Gatchina-Varshavskaya station

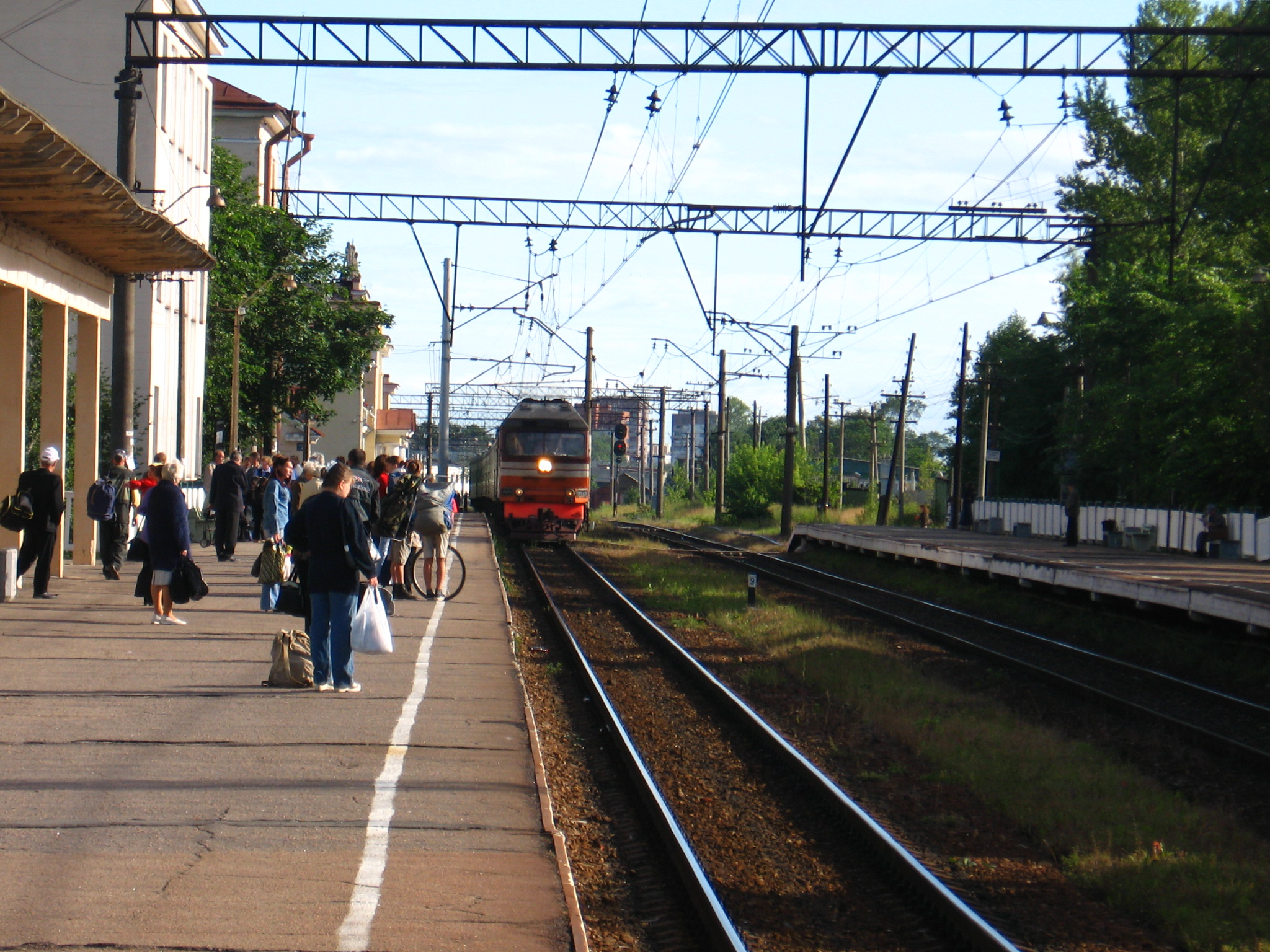
Platform for the trains towards Luga in 2005

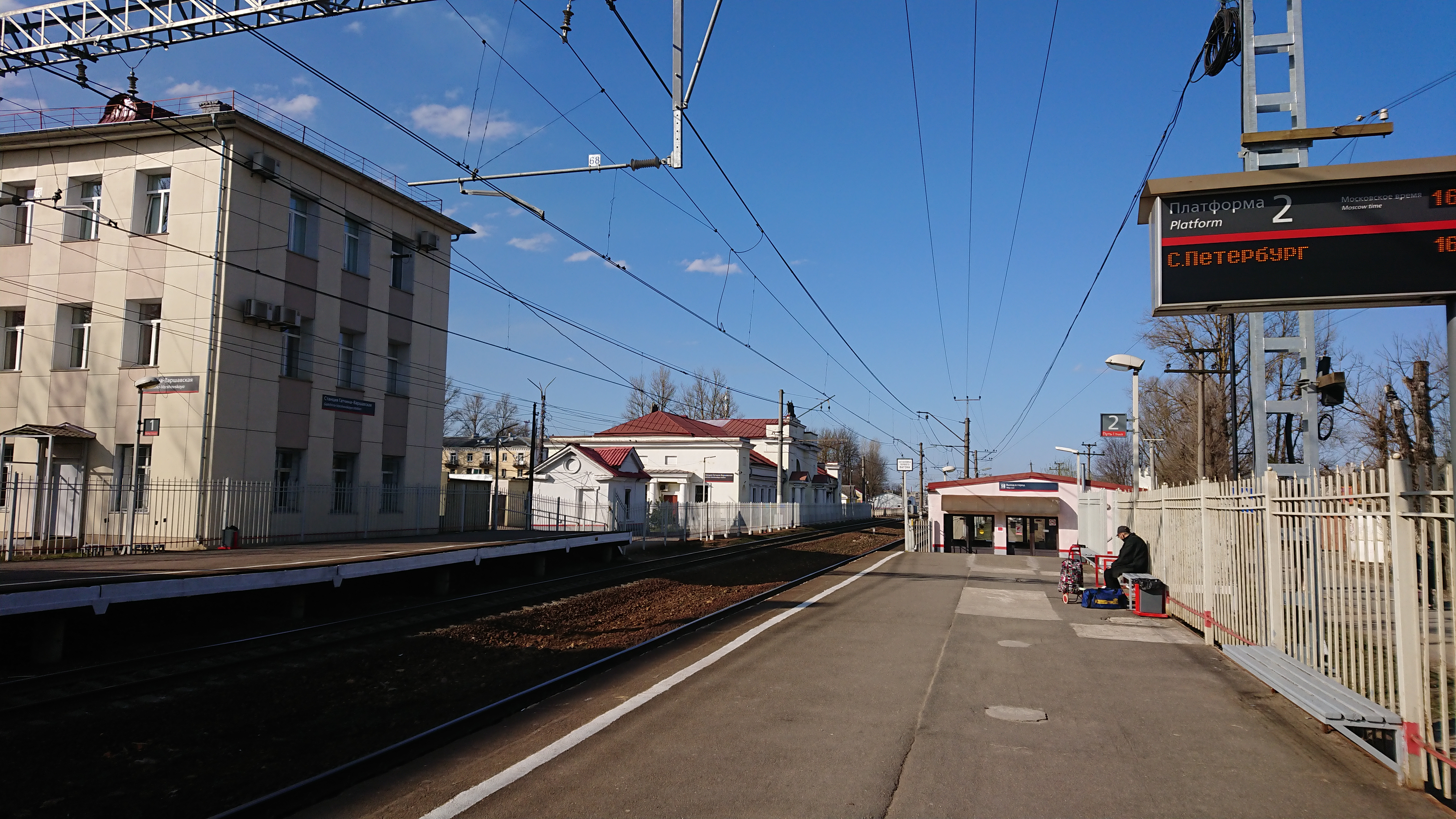
Platform for the trains towards Saint Petersburg in 2021

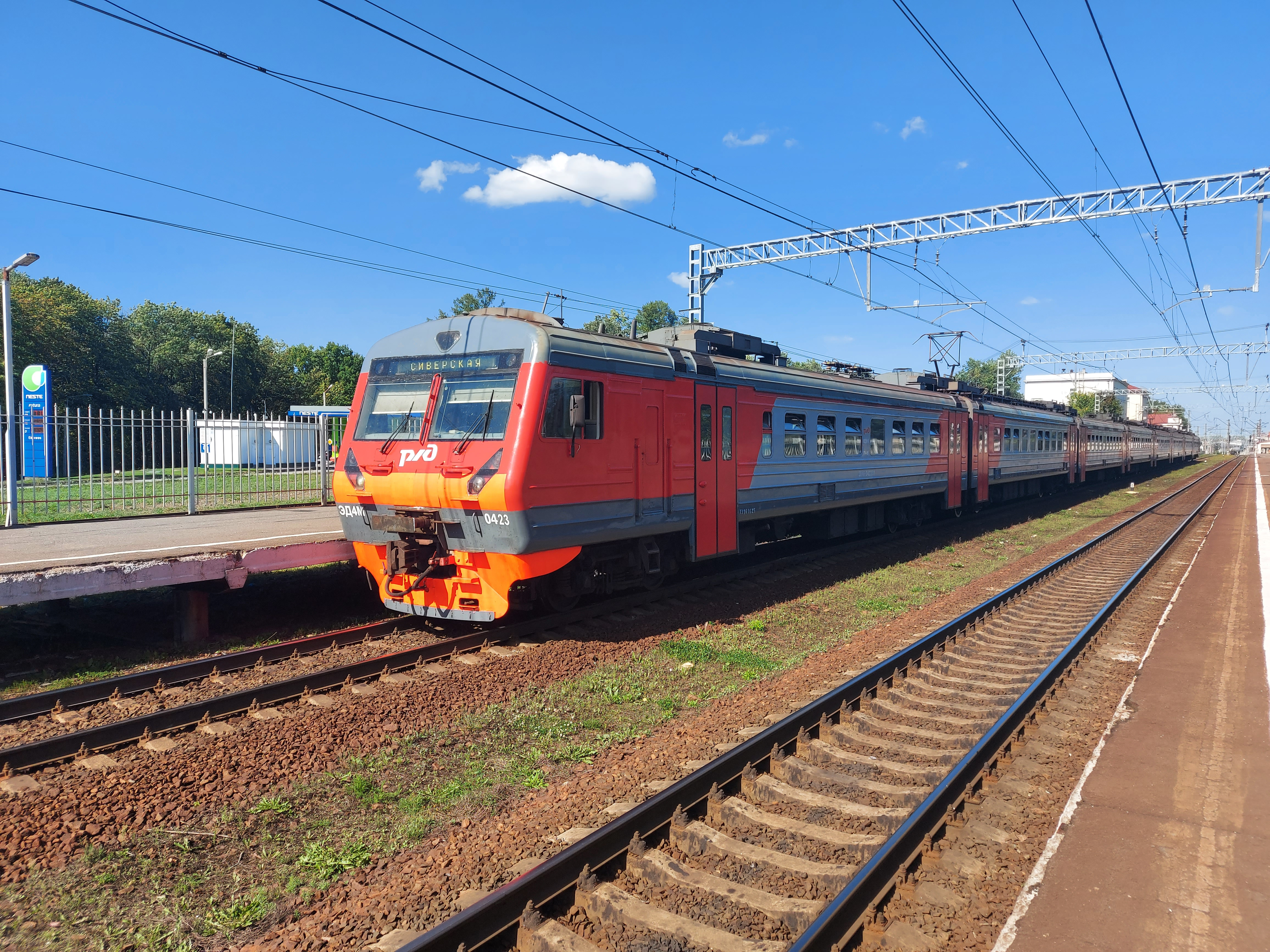
Suburban train at Gatchina-Varshavskaya station in 2022

== See also ==
- October Railway
- Rail transport in Russia
- History of rail transport in Russia
- Transport in Russia

== Bibliography ==
- Fadeyev, G. M., ed. (1994). История железнодорожного транспорта России [The history of rail transport in Russia] (in Russian). Vol. 1: 1836–1917. Saint Petersburg & Moscow.
