= Warsaw Township, Rice County, Minnesota =

Warsaw Township, Minnesota
- Township
- Location within the state of Minnesota Warsaw Township, Minnesota (the United States)
- Coordinates: 44°14′47″N 93°21′4″W
- Country: United States
- State: Minnesota
- County: Rice

Area
  - Total: 35.0 sq mi (90.7 km^{2})
  - Land: 32.4 sq mi (84.0 km^{2})
  - Water: 2.5 sq mi (6.6 km^{2})
- Elevation: 1,020 ft (311 m)

Population (2000)
  - Total: 1,433
  - Density: 44/sq mi (17/km^{2})
- Time zone: UTC-6 (Central (CST))
  - Summer (DST): UTC-5 (CDT)
- ZIP code: 55087
- Area code: 507
- FIPS code: 27-68278
- GNIS feature ID: 0665921

Warsaw Township is a township in Rice County, Minnesota, United States. The population was 1,433 at the 2000 census.

The unincorporated community of Warsaw is located within the township.

Warsaw Township was organized in 1858, and named after Warsaw, New York.

== Geography ==
According to the United States Census Bureau, the township has a total area of 35.0 square miles (90.7 km^{2}), of which 32.5 square miles (84.0 km^{2}) is land and 2.6 square miles (6.7 km^{2}) (7.34%) is water.

== Demographics ==
As of the census of 2000, there were 1,433 people, 502 households, and 403 families residing in the township. The population density was 44.2 inhabitants per square mile (17.1/km^{2}). There were 566 housing units at an average density of 17.4/sq mi (6.7/km^{2}). The racial makeup of the township was 99.58% White, 0.07% African American, 0.28% from other races, and 0.07% from two or more races. Hispanic or Latino of any race were 0.84% of the population.

There were 502 households, out of which 37.6% had children under the age of 18 living with them, 72.1% were married couples living together, 4.6% had a female householder with no husband present, and 19.7% were non-families. 15.1% of all households were made up of individuals, and 6.0% had someone living alone who was 65 years of age or older. The average household size was 2.85 and the average family size was 3.19.

In the township the population was spread out, with 27.1% under the age of 18, 8.2% from 18 to 24, 28.6% from 25 to 44, 25.8% from 45 to 64, and 10.4% who were 65 years of age or older. The median age was 37 years. For every 100 females, there were 103.8 males. For every 100 females age 18 and over, there were 105.3 males.

The median income for a household in the township was $60,185, and the median income for a family was $62,802. Males had a median income of $38,750 versus $25,781 for females. The per capita income for the township was $22,119. About 3.6% of families and 4.3% of the population were below the poverty line, including 5.9% of those under age 18 and 6.1% of those age 65 or over.

== Images ==
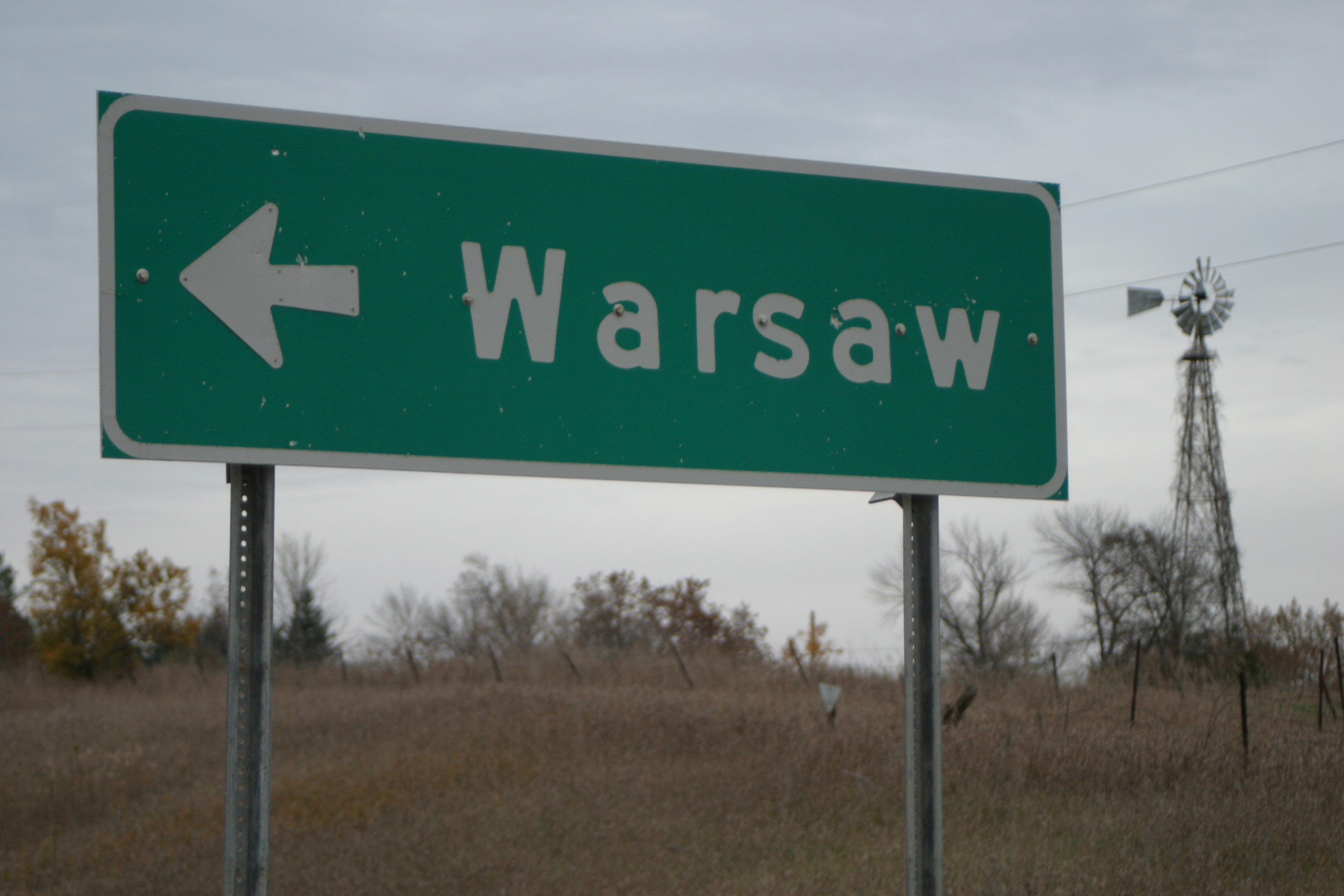
Sign on MN HWY 60 indicating turn-off to Warsaw

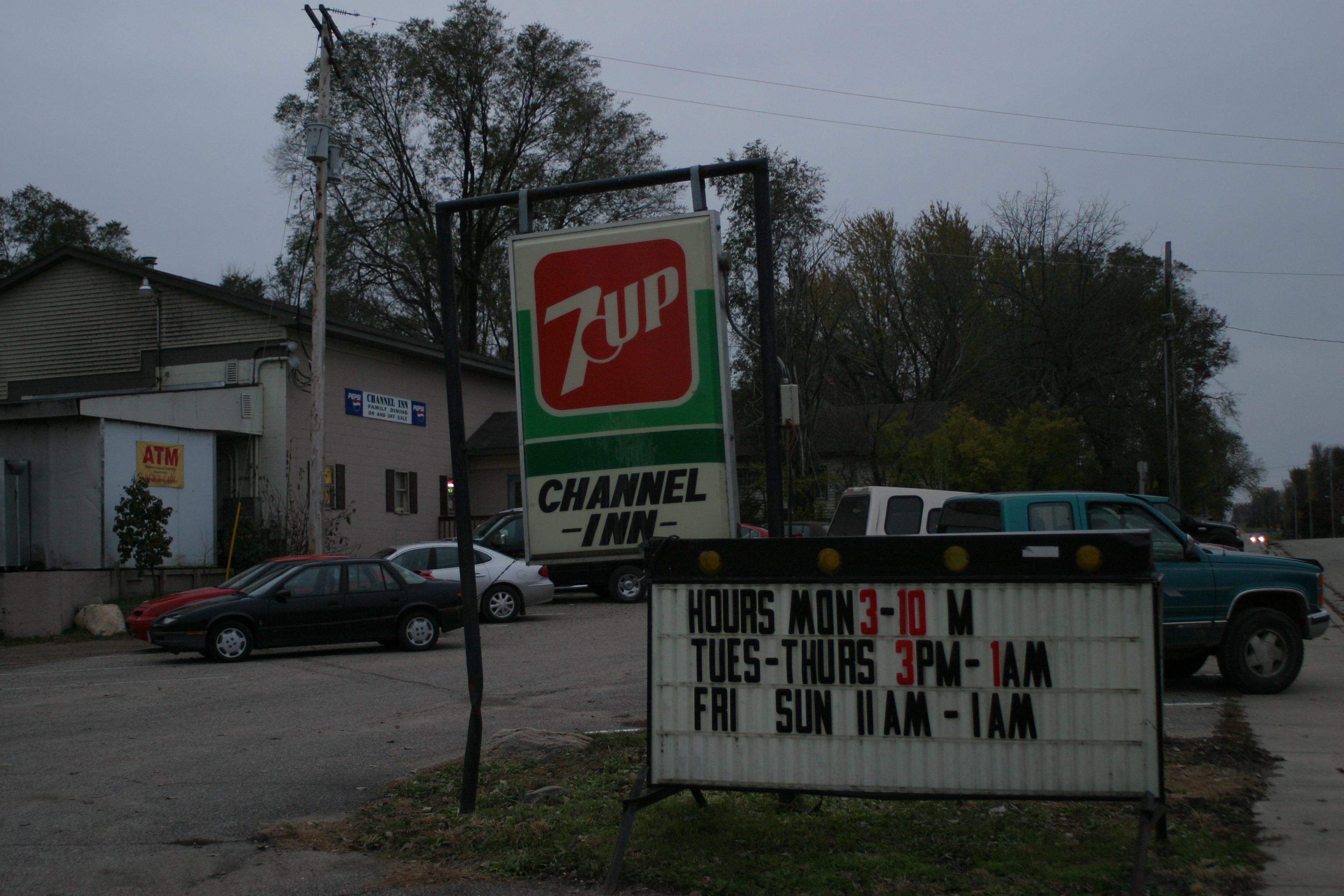
The Channel Inn tavern in Warsaw
