= Sergeant pilot =

Commonwealth military rank

A sergeant pilot was a non-commissioned officer who had undergone flight training and was a qualified pilot in the air forces of several Commonwealth countries before, during and after World War II. It was also a term used in the United States Army Air Forces, where they were commonly called flying sergeants.

== Germany ==
Enlisted pilots of the rank of unteroffizier and above made up a considerable portion of German fighter aces in World War I. NCOs who scored large numbers of aerial victories were often commissioned. A notable example was the trio of sergeant pilots dubbed the Golden Triumvirate; Otto Konnecke (35 victories), Fritz Rumey (45 victories), and Josef Mai (30 victories). Their combined victories came to almost half of all victories scored by the third most successful fighter squadron of the war, Jagdstaffel 5.

== United Kingdom and Commonwealth ==
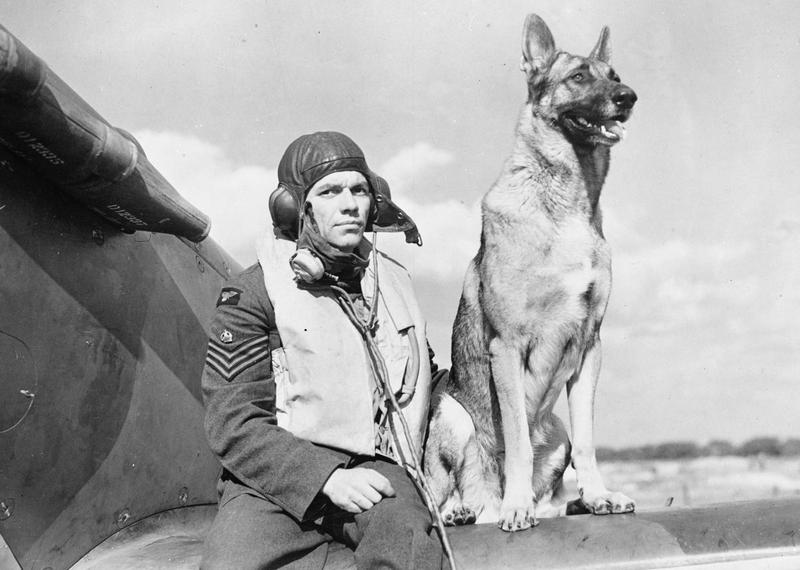
Royal Air Force Flight Sergeant George Unwin, September 1940. He would later receive a commission and rise to the rank of Wing Commander

In Commonwealth air forces, a sergeant pilot could be promoted to flight sergeant pilot and warrant officer pilot. Many went on to be commissioned. Royal Air Force sergeant pilots were redesignated pilots IV, III or II, and flight sergeant pilots were redesignated pilots I between 1946 and 1950, when the old ranks were restored. Warrant officer pilots were redesignated master pilots in 1946, and this was retained after 1950. There were still master pilots flying helicopters with the Royal Air Force until at least 1979, but all RAF pilots must now be commissioned officers.

Other ranks may still qualify and operate as pilots in the British Army Air Corps. Until 2022, personnel had to hold the rank of lance corporal or above to apply for pilot training and were promoted to acting sergeant on completion of their training. Since 2022, privates have been permitted to apply for pilot training.

== United States ==
The United States Army Air Forces originally favoured officer pilots and the few enlisted pilots were usually civilian-qualified. The adoption of transport and strategic bombing missions meant that a larger number of pilots were needed to perform monotonous and gruelling jobs. Officer pilots were usually assigned to fly fighters and fighter-bombers and commanded units. Enlisted pilots, called flying sergeants with the rank of staff sergeant usually were assigned to fly light reconnaissance and artillery-spotter aircraft, cargo aircraft, and medium- and heavy-weight bombers.

The Flight Officer Act of 1942 created the warrant officer rank of flight officer. All enlisted pilots were promoted to that rank and the rank of flying sergeant was discontinued. The flight officer rank was cancelled in 1945 due to there being adequate numbers of commissioned pilots.

The United States Navy and United States Marine Corps had several programmes to train civilian pilots and enlisted personnel to become naval aviators. There were also programmes to train enlisted men to serve as enlisted pilots to fly torpedo and dive bombers, transport and reconnaissance planes, and airships.

On 17 December 2015, the United States Air Force announced that it would begin training enlisted airmen to fly remotely piloted aircraft, specifically the RQ-4 Global Hawk. The first two enlisted pilots since 1961 soloed on 3 November 2016 at Pueblo Municipal Airport in a Diamond DA20. The first-ever female enlisted pilot completed RPA training at Joint Base San Antonio-Randolph on 3 August 2017.
