= Hans Berr =

German soldier and flying ace

- Hans Berr, wearing the Pour le Merite awarded him on 4 December 1916. He died in action four months later.
- Born: 20 May 1890; Magdeburg, German Empire
- Died: 6 April 1917(Age 26); Vicinity of Noyelles, France
- Burial place: Neuer Friedhof, Potsdam
- Military career
- Allegiance: German Empire
- Branch: Infantry; aviation
- Service years: 1908 - 1917
- Rank: Oberleutnant (First Lieutenant)
- Units: 4th Magdeburg Reserve Regiment Light Infantry; Royal Prussian Magdeburg Jägerbattalion No.4; Kampfeinsitzerkommando Avillers (Combat Single-Seater Command Avilliers)
- Commands: Jagdstaffel 5
- Awards: Pour le Merite; Royal House Order of Hohenzollern; Iron Cross First Class; Military Merit Order; Reuss War Merit Cross; Brunswick War Merit Cross; Hanseatic Cross (Hamburg)

Oberleutnant Hans Berr (20 May 1890 – 6 April 1917) was a German professional soldier and World War I flying ace. At the start of the First World War, he served in a Jäger battalion until severely wounded; he then transferred to aviation duty. Once trained as a pilot, he helped pioneer the world's first dedicated fighter airplane, the Fokker Eindecker "flying gun". Flying one, Berr shot down two enemy airplanes in March 1916 as his contribution to the Fokker Scourge. Berr was then chosen to command one of the world's original fighter squadrons, Jagdstaffel 5. Leading his pilots by example, Berr scored eight more victories in a four-week span in October - November 1916 while his pilots began to compile their own victories. Hans Berr was awarded Germany's highest military honor, the Pour le Merite, on 4 December 1916. During a 6 April 1917 dogfight, Berr and his wingman mortally collided.

== Early life and service ==
Hans Berr was born in Magdeburg, Prussian Saxony on 20 May 1890. His father was a civil servant in the Reichspost. Berr attended the Wilhelm-Gymnasium in Hamburg, which he graduated in the Summer of 1906 with "Obersekundareife". This leaving certificate would not have qualified him to attend university, but opened the door to serving in the army for only one year instead of the mandatory three ("Einjährig-Freiwilliger"), qualifying for officer school afterwards.

He joined the army as an infantry lieutenant in 1908. When the war broke out, he was serving with Magdeburgisches Jäger-Bataillon Nr. 4 (Magdeburg Scout Battalion No. 4). A month into his war, on 26 September 1914, Berr was seriously wounded. On 27 January 1915, he was promoted to Oberleutnant.

== Flying service ==
In March 1915, he transferred to aviation duty and began aerial service as an aerial observer. He subsequently took pilot training. Upon completion of pilot training, Berr was assigned to an ad hoc unit of Fokker Eindecker fighters at Avillers, France. Kampfeinsitzerkommando Avillers (Combat Single-Seater Command Avilliers, commonly KEK Avillers) was one of a number of similarly-named Eindecker tactical groupings of two to four planes. The Eindeckers were the first true fighter planes; with their synchronizer gear slaved to their machine guns, they could fire through their own propeller arc without damaging the blades and shooting themselves down. Berr used one of these "flying guns" to shoot down a Nieuport on 8 March 1916 over the Battle of Verdun and a Caudron eight days later.

As the impact of the revolutionary flying weapon wore off, and Germany's opponents developed their own fighters, Die Fliegertruppen des deutschen Kaiserreiches (Imperial German Air Service) was reorganized into Deutsche Luftstreitkräfte (German Air Force). Several actual Jagdstaffeln (fighter squadrons) were organized. KEK Avillers was expanded into a jagdstaffel (fighter squadron), and Berr was given command of this newly founded squadron, Jagdstaffel 5, on 31 August 1916.<

== Berr in command ==
By 8 October, when the Luftstreitkräfte reorganization became official, Berr had been using his combat experience to teach tactics to his squadron. As the Autumn foul weather cleared enough for flight, both Berr and the new squadron began a run of victories that would result in its being dubbed the KanonestaffelIn ("squadron of aces").

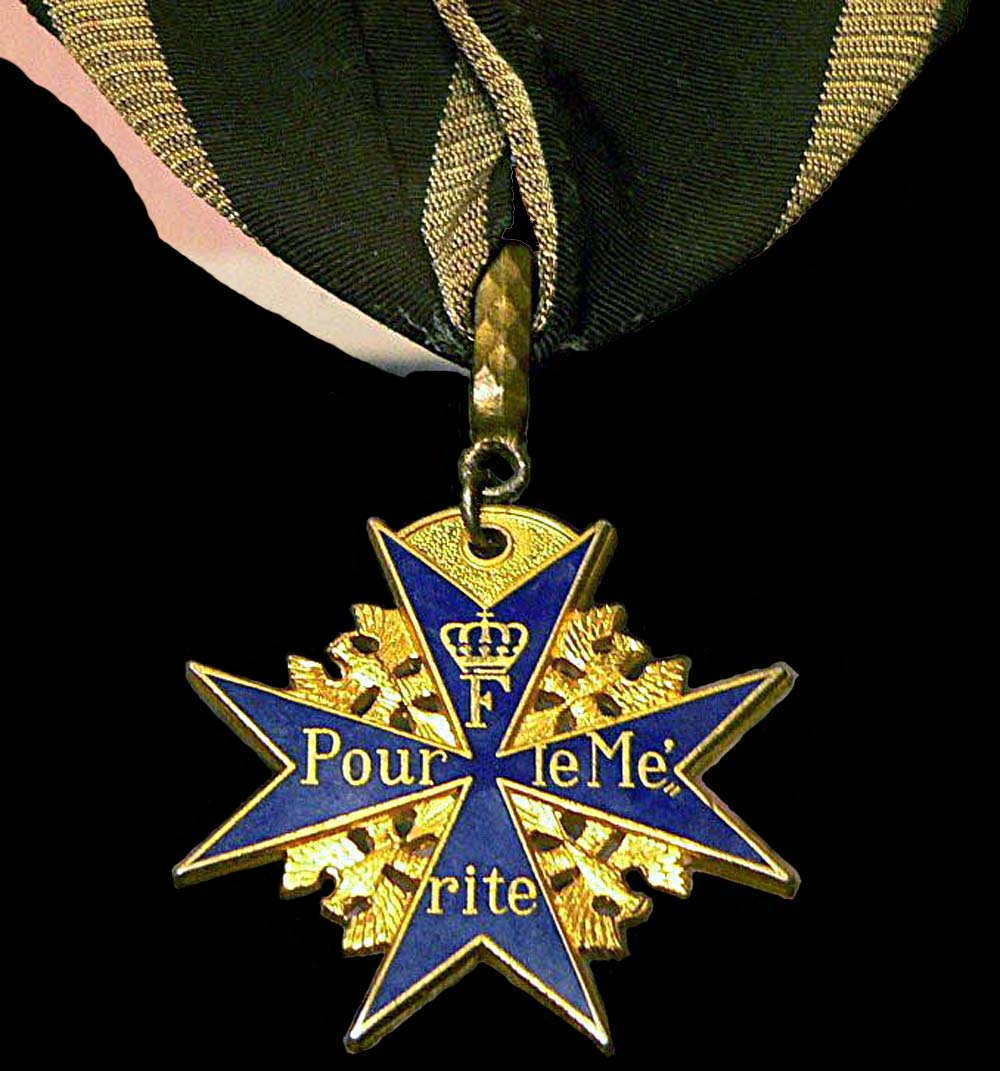
Hans Berr was the 13th German aviator to win the Blue Max.

Berr led by example. In the four weeks from 7 October to 3 November 1916, Berr shot down seven enemy airplanes and an observation balloon. (Note: Aerial observers in balloons directed artillery fire on the enemy. To protect them, antiaircraft guns encircled them and protective fighter patrols lurked near them.) On 7 October 1916, he shot down two enemy aircraft over Combles, France. On an evening patrol on 20 October, his victim was a British Royal Aircraft Factory F.E.2b. Added to his two Eindecker victories, his third triumph while flying with his squadron made Hans Berr an ace.

On 22 October, a French Morane Parasol fell under his guns. On 26 October, Berr shot down another British FE.2b at 1800 hours, followed up by a highly hazardous successful assault on an observation balloon ten minutes later. On 1 November, his victim was another Caudron. His last victory, his tenth, came on 3 November over a British BE.2C.

Now the awards caught up to the valor, as his pending nominations for awards began to be approved and the medals awarded. On 10 November 1916, he added the Royal House Order of Hohenzollern to his Iron Cross and other earlier medals. Germany's most prestigious military award followed; Berr was awarded the Blue Max on 4 December 1916. Berr was the last of the early German fliers to receive the Blue Max for eight victories. (Note: As aerial victories and aces proliferated, the minimum victory requirement was raised, eventually settling at 20.)

Hans Berr would continue to lead Jagdstaffel 5, though with no further victories.

== Death in action ==
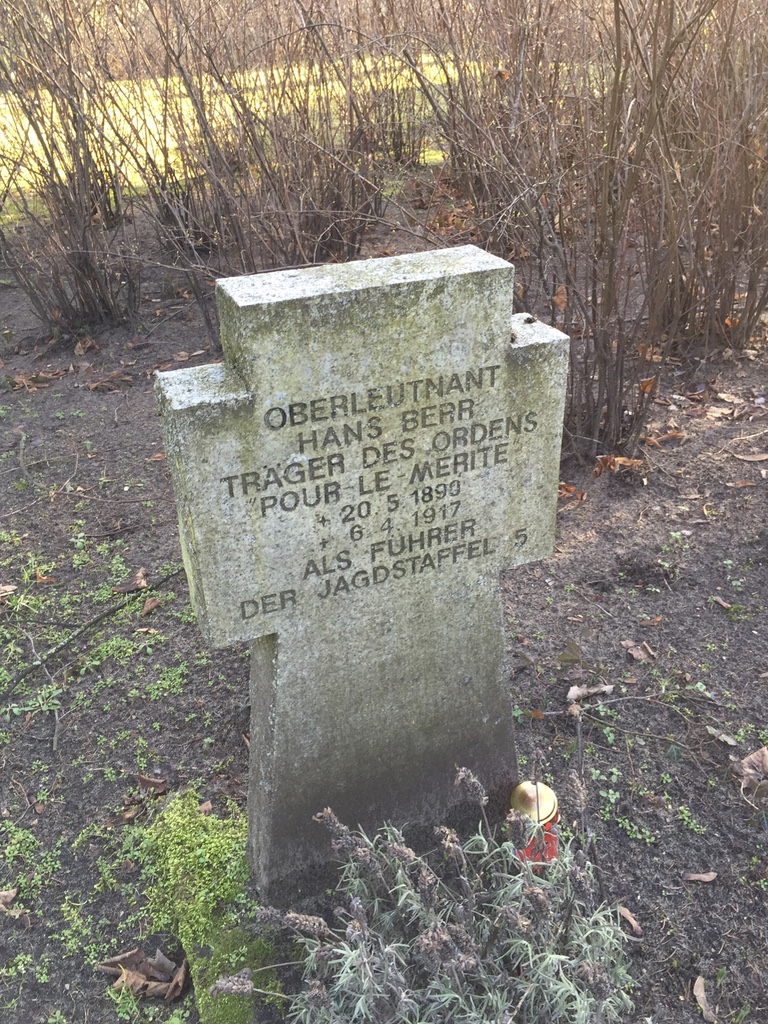
Hans Berr's gravestone stands in Potsdam (Germany).

On Good Friday, 6 April 1917, Berr and his wingman Paul Hoppe collided and were killed while engaged in a dogfight with No. 57 Squadron RFC.

Hans Berr is buried in the Neuer Friedhof in Potsdam, Germany.

== Legacy ==
Hans Berr's leadership established Jagdstaffel 5 as one of the German military's premier units. At least eight aces besides Berr served in its ranks, including Hermann Goering and Werner Voss. (Note: Other aces included Bruno Loerzer, Heinrich Gontermann, Paul Bäumer, Otto Könnecke, Fritz Rumey and Otto Könnecke.) By the Armistice, Jagdstaffel 5 had the third highest aerial victory score of any German fighter squadron, having amassed over 250 aerial victories.

== Sources ==
- Franks, Norman L. R.; Bailey, Frank W.; Guest, Russell (1993). Above the lines : the aces and fighter units of the German Air Service, Naval Air Service and Flanders Marine Corps, 1914-1918. London: Grub Street. ISBN 978-0-948817-73-1. OCLC 30027887.
- Kilduff, Peter (1997). The Red Baron Combat Wing : Jagdgeschwader Richthofen in battle. London: Arms and Armour. ISBN 9781854092663. OCLC 38423201.
- Merrill, G. K. (2004). Jagdstaffel 5. Berkhamsted: Albatros Productions. ISBN 978-1902207674. OCLC 244314191.
- VanWyngarden, Greg (2006). Early German aces of World War I. Oxford: Osprey Publishing. ISBN 978-1-84176-997-4. OCLC 70672469.
