= Listed buildings in Dearne South =

Dearne South is a ward in the Dearne Valley in the metropolitan borough of Barnsley, South Yorkshire, England. The ward contains five listed buildings that are recorded in the National Heritage List for England. Of these, one is listed at Grade I, the highest of the three grades, and the others are at Grade II, the lowest grade. The ward contains the village of Bolton upon Dearne, and all the listed buildings are in the village. These consist of a church, a farmhouse and farm buildings, and a war memorial.

== Key ==
Grade	Criteria
I	Particularly important buildings of more than special interest
II	Buildings of national importance and special interest

== Buildings ==
Name and location	Photograph	Date	Notes	Grade
St Andrew's Church; 53.51745°N 1.31405°W		Late 10th or early 11th century	The nave is Saxon, and it incorporates an arcade from about 1200. The chancel and north aisle date from the early 14th century, the west tower from the 15th–16th century, and the north chapel and vestry were added in the 19th century. The church is built in sandstone and the nave has a tile roof. The tower is in Perpendicular style, and has three stages, diagonal buttresses, a round-arched west doorway with a chamfered surround and a hood mould, a three-light west window, clock faces, and an embattled parapet with crocketed corner pinnacles.	I
Grange Farmhouse and farm buildings 53.51760°N 1.31853°W	—	Early 18th century	The farmhouse and attached farm buildings are in stone, largely rendered, with quoins, and roofs of Welsh slate and stone slate, with coped gables and kneelers. The farmhouse has a chamfered plinth, three storeys, three bays, and a rear wing. Steps lead up to a central doorway that has a moulded surround, a cabled frieze, and a moulded hood. The windows are a mix of sashes and casements. The farm buildings consist of a cowshed with a hayloft above, and there are external steps leading to an upper floor doorway.	II
Barn and cartshed, Grange Farm; 53.51713°N 1.31844°W	—	Mid 18th century	A threshing barn and attached cart shed, they are in stone, and have roofs of Welsh slate and stone slate with coped gables and moulded kneelers. The barn has double threshing doors, a hay loft opening and vents. The cart shed has a single storey, and an open front with two iron columns.	II
Animal shelter, hay loft and stables, Grange Farm; 53.51735°N 1.31837°W	—	Early 19th century	The building is in stone, and has a stone slate roof with coped gables and kneelers. It contains various openings, some blocked.	II
Bolton-upon-Dearne War Memorial; 53.51735°N 1.31837°W	—	1925	The war memorial commemorates the old boys of Bolton-upon-Dearne Board School who were lost in the First World War. It incorporates a former inglenook fireplace, which is roofed, and it contains a central square plinth in the form of a Roman altar. The memorial is in sandstone and red brick, with a roof of red tiles, and has an inscribed lintel with the names of those lost in the war.	II
