= George Lawson (RAF officer) =

George Edgar Bruce Lawson
- Born: April 26, 1899; Cape Town, Cape Colony
- Died: 19 November 1922 (aged 23)
- Relatives: Frank Lionel Lawson (brother); Elsa Gertrude Lawson (sister)
- Military career
- Allegiance: British Empire
- Branch: Royal Flying Corps
- Rank: Lieutenant
- Unit: No. 32 Squadron RAF
- Awards: Distinguished Flying Cross
- Other work: Joined South African Air Force

Lieutenant George Edgar Bruce Lawson was a South African World War I flying ace credited with six aerial victories.

== Early life ==
Lawson was born on 26 April 1899 in Cape Town, Cape Colony. After the Union of South Africa was formed the family travelled by train and then by ox wagon to Johannesburg.

== World War I ==
Lawson was assigned to 32 Squadron in April 1918. He scored his first victory on 7 June 1918, driving down an Albatros D.V while flying Royal Aircraft Factory SE5a No. C1881. He then used No. E1399 to drive down two Fokker D.VIIs and destroy three others during September 1918. The last of those triumphs, his second of 27 September, resulted in the death in action of noted German ace Fritz Rumey of Jagdstaffel 5. Lawson and Rumey collided in midair. Rumey bailed out, but his parachute failed to open. Lawson nursed his crippled plane back to the British lines. He was later awarded the Distinguished Flying Cross. The citation read:

Lieut. George Edgar Bruce Lawson. (FRANCE) A pilot of courage and skill, bold in attack and gallant in action, who has accounted for five enemy aeroplanes. On 27 September he attacked fifteen Fokker biplanes that were harassing one of our bombing formations, driving down one in flames. He then engaged a second; in the combat the two machines collided, and the enemy aeroplane fell down completely out of control. Although his machine was badly damaged, Lieutenant Lawson successfully regained our lines.

== Postwar ==
Lawson joined the South African Air Force in 1922. He was killed in an accident on 19 November 1922 while riding as a passenger in an Airco DH.9.
