= Rumey =

- Arfin Rumey Bangladeshi musician
- Fritz Rumey German fighter pilot
