= List of aerial victories of Hans Berr =

Hans Berr was a German First World War fighter ace credited with 10 victories. Flying a fighter plane, the Fokker Eindecker, Berr was one of the pilots known as the Fokker Scourge. He was one of the first German Jagdstaffel commanders, leading Jagdstaffel 5.

No.	Date/time	Aircraft	Unit	Foe	Location	Notes
1	8 March 1916	Fokker Eindekker	Kampfeinsitzerkommando Avillers	Nieuport	Verdun	Casualty from French Escadrille MS3
2	14 March 1916	Fokker Eindekker	Kampfeinsitzerkommando Avillers	Caudron	Northwest of Verdun	
3	7 October 1916 @ 1010 hours		Jagdstaffel 5	Caudron	Combles	
4	7 October 1916		Jagdstaffel 5	Royal Aircraft Factory B.E.12	Combles	Casualty from No. 34 Squadron RFC
5	20 October 1916 @ 1700 hours		Jagdstaffel 5	Royal Aircraft Factory FE.2b	Southeast of Le Transloy	
6	22 October 1916 @ 1100 hours		Jagdstaffel 5	Morane Parasol	Sailley	Casualty from No. 3 Squadron RFC
7	26 October 1916 @ 1800 hours		Jagdstaffel 5	Royal Aircraft Factory FE.2b (s/n 4933)	Le Transloy	Casualty from No. 18 Squadron RFC. Both 2nd Lt. Philip Forsyth Heppel and 2nd Lt. H.B.O. Mitchell WIA and POW
8	26 October 1916 @ 1810 hours		Jagdstaffel 5	Observation balloon	South of Maurepas	
9	1 November 1916 @ 1615 hours		Jagdstaffel 5	Caudron	Southeast of Courcelette	
10	3 November 1916 @ 1745 hours		Jagdstaffel 5	Royal Aircraft Factory B.E.2	Northwest of Martinpuich	
