= Eugene Seeley Coler =

- Born: 13 January 1896; New York City, New York, U.S.
- Died: 30 August 1953 (aged 57); Gerrard's Cross, Buckinghamshire, England
- Military career
- Allegiance: United Kingdom; United States
- Branch: Royal Air Force (United Kingdom); United States Army Air Forces; United States Air Force
- Service years: 1917-1918 (UK); 1942-1953 (USA)
- Rank: Lieutenant (UK); Colonel (USA)
- Units: Royal Air Force: No. 11 Squadron RAF; United States Army Air Forces: 319th Bombardment Group; VIII Bomber Command; United States Air Force: 7th Air Division
- Conflicts: World War I World War II
- Awards: Distinguished Flying Cross (United Kingdom)
- Other work: Served in American air units during World War II and Korean War

Lieutenant (later Colonel) Eugene Seeley Coler (1896–1953) was an American World War I flying ace who served in the British Royal Flying Corps and Royal Air Force. He was credited with 16 aerial victories.

== Early life and service ==
Although born in New York City, Coler was native to Newark, New Jersey. His parents were William Nichols (Jr.) and Lillie Seeley Coler, and his brother was William Nichols Coler III.

Eugene Coler joined the RFC in Canada in 1917. After several weeks training, he embarked for England on 29 October 1917. He received further flight training in England. On 12 March 1918, he was assigned to No. 11 Squadron RFC (later to become No. 11 Squadron RAF), which was operating from Vert Galand on the Western Front. At that time, No. 11 Squadron was flying long range reconnaissance sorties.

== World War I combat service ==
Flying Bristol F.2 Fighter No. C792, he and his gunner Cyril Gladman attacked a formation of 14 German fighters on 9 May 1918. They drove three German Pfalz D.III fighters down out of control on this single combat sortie.

On 13 August 1918, Coler and Gladman destroyed three Fokker D.VIIs and drove down two others out of control within a few minutes; Seeley won the DFC for this mission. The action began when Coler dived on 20 Fokker D.VIIs, setting one with a red nose and yellow fuselage on fire from a range of ten yards. He sent another spinning down out of control before his Vickers machine guns jammed. While he was clearing the jam, Gladman knocked a Fokker down out of control. As Coler cleared his guns' stoppage, a Fokker crossed before him 50 yards out; Coler fired 60 rounds into it and set it afire. Gladman then was shot in the right shoulder while changing ammunition drums. Nothing daunted, he shot it down left-handed, sending it down in flames.

The following day, Coler and Gladman were forced to land behind British lines, the gunner being severely wounded. The German responsible seems to have been Otto Könnecke.

On 30 August, Coler changed gunners and planes, flying Bristol F.2 Fighter No. E2215 when he destroyed a Pfalz D.XII and a Fokker D.VII almost simultaneously. He then destroyed two enemy fighter planes each on 6 September, 15 September, and 16 September. On the last date, he was wounded in action. Bruno Loerzer scored his 40th victory by puncturing the fuel tank and cutting the aileron controls on Coler's Bristol and driving it into a crash-landing near Beugny. While Coler was power diving into this controlled crash, two Germans who were chasing him overran their prospective target and were shot down by Coler and his gunner.

== After World War I ==
He became a physician after the war; his practice was in New York City. During World War II, he served as a bomber pilot of the 319th Bombardment Group of the United States Army Air Corps in North Africa. He also served in Italy and England; the latter assignment was with the Eighth Air Force with the rank of major.

In 1951, Coler returned to service once again, with the United States Air Force. He was assigned to the 7th Air Division as the air division's flight surgeon at the time of his death. It was during this assignment that he treated victims of the Harrow train crash of 8 October 1952. His service in American military aviation earned him the Legion of Merit and the Bronze Star Medal.

== Honors and awards ==
Distinguished Flying Cross (DFC)

Lieut. (A./Capt.) Eugene Seeley Coler. (FRANCE)

Bold in attack and skilful in manoeuvre, this officer never hesitates to engage the enemy regardless of disparity in numbers. On 13 August when on escort duty, he dived on a formation of twenty enemy aeroplanes. In the engagement that ensued he himself destroyed three and his observer two making a total of five machines destroyed in the fight; a fine performance, reflecting great credit on the officers concerned.

== See also ==
- List of World War I flying aces from the United States

== Bibliography ==
- In clouds of glory: American airmen who flew with the British during the Great War. James J. Hudson. University of Arkansas Press, 1990. ISBN 1-55728-124-6, ISBN 978-1-55728-124-1
- Bristol F2 Fighter Aces of World War I. Jon Guttman, Harry Dempsey. Osprey Publishing, 2007. ISBN 1-84603-201-6, ISBN 978-1-84603-201-1
- American Aces of World War I. Norman Franks, Harry Dempsey. Osprey Publishing, 2001. ISBN 1-84176-375-6, ISBN 978-1-84176-375-0
