= Kurt Schneider (aviator) =

German flying ace (1888–1917)

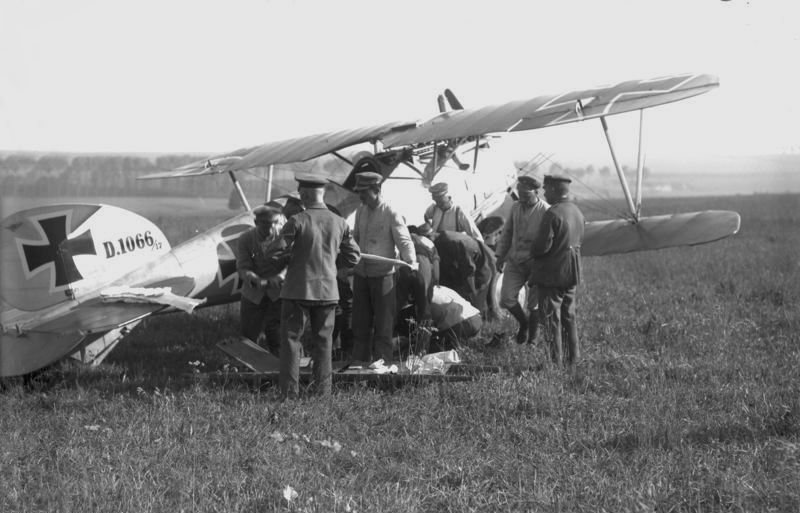
- The wounded Schneider being removed from his aircraft 5 June 1917
- Born: 4 October 1888; Wurzen, German Empire
- Died: 4 July 1917 (aged 28) near Caudry, France
- Military career
- Branch: Luftstreitkräfte
- Rank: Leutnant
- Unit: Jagdstaffel 5
- Awards: Iron Cross (both first and second class); Albert Order (Knight 2nd class with swords); Military Order of St. Henry (Knight's Cross)

Leutnant Kurt Schneider (4 October 1888 – 14 July 1917) was a German World War I flying ace credited with 15 aerial victories.

== Biography ==
Kurt Schneider was born in Wurzen, Kingdom of Saxony, the German Empire on 4 October 1888. He began his World War I military service in Germany's land forces, winning an Iron Cross Second Class on 15 March 1915. Later in 1915 he joined the Luftstreitkräfte and was a founding member of Jasta 5 upon its establishment in August 1916. Schneider's exploits earned him an Albert Order on 13 January 1917.

He scored his first aerial victory on 17 March 1917; by 29 April his tally was at 12, including three observation balloons. He ascended to temporary command of the squadron on 6 May 1917. By the time he was wounded and forced to land on 5 June, his victory total was 15 confirmed, and one unverified. After his return to action, he was again forced to land with wounds on 14 July 1917. He did not survive. He was awarded the Military Order of St. Henry ten days after his death.
