= Edward Carter Eaton =

Canadian flying ace

- Born: 17 September 1898; Montreal, Canada
- Died: 26 June 1918 (aged 19); Neuville-Saint-Rémy, France
- Military career
- Allegiance: British Empire
- Branch: Royal Flying Corps
- Service years: 1915–1918
- Rank: Lieutenant
- Unit: No. 65 Squadron RAF
- Awards: Croix de Guerre

Edward Carter Eaton (17 September 1898 – 26 June 1918) was a Canadian First World War flying ace credited with five confirmed aerial victories.

== Biography ==
Eaton was born in Montreal, Canada on 17 September 1898. At the time of his enlistment on 11 August 1915, he gave his birth date as 1896. He was 5 feet 6 inches tall, with dark hair and hazel eyes.

Eaton served in France during late 1917 with No. 65 Squadron RAF as a Sopwith Camel pilot. In company with a couple of other British pilots, Eaton drove an Albatros D.III down out of control on 23 November 1917 for his first aerial victory. On 4 January 1918, he sent an Albatros D.V down out of control over Passendale. His next two victories came when he and another British pilot destroyed another D.V on 16 February, and a Fokker Dr.1 triplane on 20 May. On 28 May, he drove down a German Pfalz D.III out of control to become an ace.

On 26 June 1918, Eaton was involved in a dogfight, and was shot down and killed by Fritz Rumey.

See also Aerial victory standards of World War I.
