= The Sherlocks =

English indie rock band

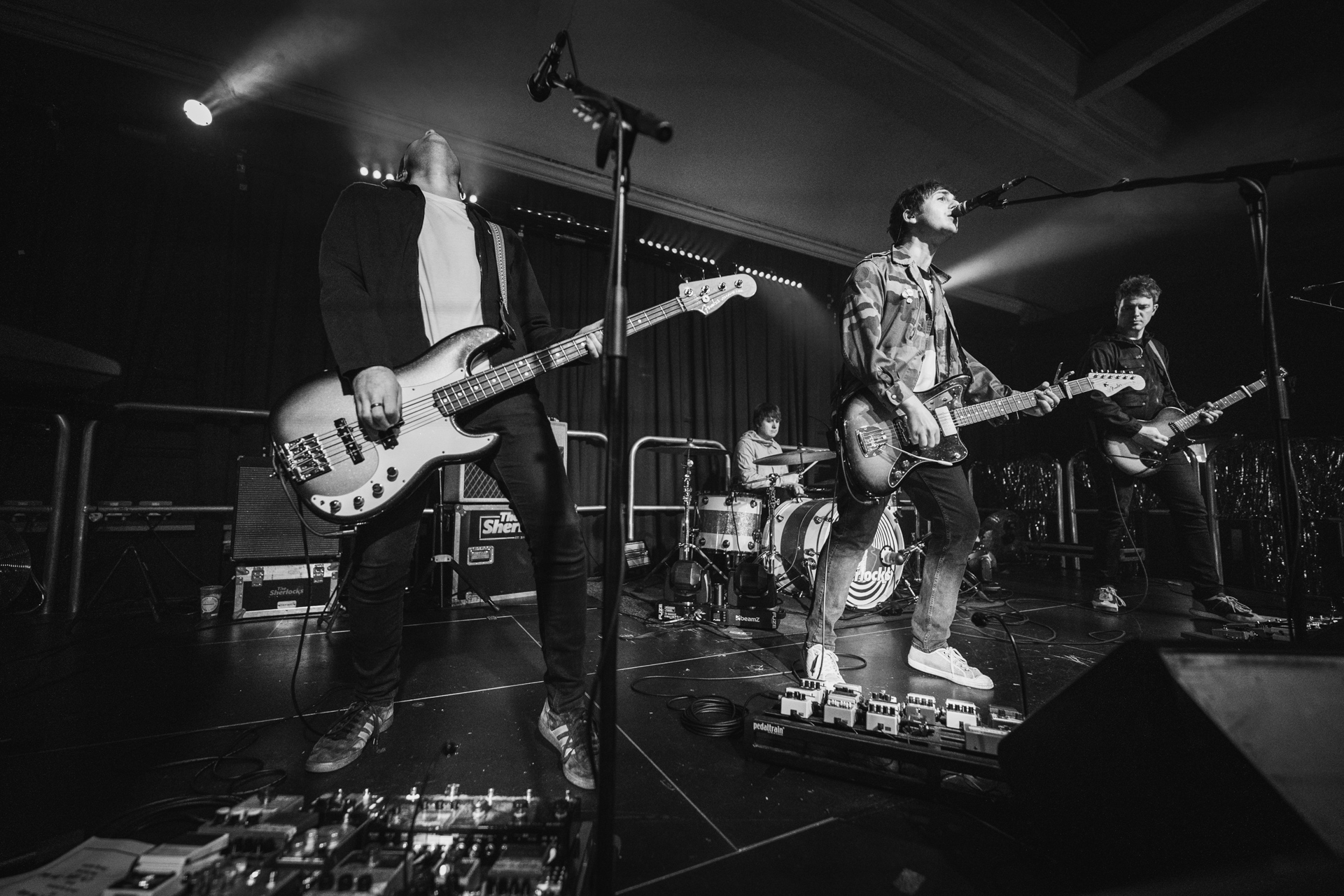
- The Sherlocks in 2025

Background information
- Origin: Bolton upon Dearne, South Yorkshire, England
- Genres: Indie rock, alternative rock
- Years active: 2010–present
- Labels: Infectious, BMG
- Members: Kiaran Crook (lead vocals, guitar); Brandon Crook (drums); Alex Procter (guitar); Trent Jackson (bass)
- Past members: Josh Davidson; Andy Davidson

The Sherlocks are an English indie rock band from Bolton upon Dearne, South Yorkshire. The band consists of brothers, Kiaran & Brandon Crook along with Alex Procter & Trent Jackson.

== History ==
=== Early career ===
The band formed in the summer of 2010 in the village of Bolton upon Dearne in South Yorkshire. They initially jammed covers in each other's garages before going on to play local working men's clubs.

The band members soon started to pen their own songs, slowly working them into their live sets. Quickly building a devoted following they went on to become the first unsigned band since The Arctic Monkeys to sell out The Leadmill in Sheffield.

Debut single "Live for the Moment" (2014) and follow up "Escapade" (2015) were followed by appearances at Reading and Leeds Festivals in August 2015. Third single "Heart of Gold" received airplay from BBC Radio 1's Annie Mac, Huw Stephens, Greg James and BBC 6 Music's Steve Lamacq.

Fourth single, "Last Night", was released in February 2016, with the band being invited by BBC Introducing to play the SXSW festival in March 2016 in Austin, Texas. The band also played the Dot to Dot festival in Manchester in May 2016, before appearing once more at the Leeds and Reading Festivals 2016. In 2016, they also supported The Libertines as part of their Arena Tour. The Sherlocks released their fifth single, "Will You Be There?", on 15 September 2016.

The Sherlocks announced they had been signed by Infectious Music on 19 December 2016. A limited edition 7" vinyl of "Will You Be There?" was released in early January 2017, entering the Official UK Vinyl Singles Chart at number 1 on 13 January. On 26 January 2017, the band released their sixth single "Was It Really Worth It?", with the video appearing online on Valentine's Day (14 February) 2017, which also topped the Official UK Vinyl Singles Chart. The band followed up these releases with their first headlining tour of the UK.

At 20:28 UTC on 10 February 2017, at a show in Manchester, a 17-year-old fan named Adam Boyd was able to get backstage by anonymously editing the band's Wikipedia page and stating that he was Crook's cousin. After the security guard fell for his trick, he was granted access to the VIP section, where he met the band. The band positively reacted to his scheme, saying "Fair play to the lad, we found it very funny and he put some good thought into it. Even funnier that his plan worked. Good effort!"

=== Live for the Moment (2017) ===
On 25 April 2017, The Sherlocks announced their debut album Live for the Moment released on 18 August 2017, as well as their seventh single "Chasing Shadows'", with the video having been released on 27 April 2017. The album was recorded at The Quadrangle, part of Rockfield Studios in Monmouthshire.

Following the release of the album the group headed out on a tour in the UK, Europe and USA to support its release. They also supported Liam Gallagher on his European tour.

Towards the end of the year the band entered Parr Street Studios in Liverpool. There they recorded their second album with front man of The Coral James Skelly as producer.

On 8 June 2019 the band played at Elland Road stadium for the celebration of 100 years of Leeds United, supporting Kaiser Chiefs and The Vaccines.

=== Under Your Sky (2019) ===
On 17 June 2019 it was announced the band would release their second album, Under Your Sky on 4 October 2019. They also announced a UK and European tour on this date, which they will play the songs from their new album alongside Live for the Moment tracks.

On 17 June 2019, The Sherlocks also announced that their track, "NYC (Sing It Loud)" would feature on BBC Radio 1, played by Annie Mac.

On 12 July 2019, the band played at Castlefield Bowl supporting The Kooks alongside other indie band, Sea Girls.

On 4 October 2019, the band released their second studio album, Under Your Sky. The band played the song on their live UK tour in February–March 2020.

In early 2020 the COVID-19 pandemic spread across the world putting the bands plans on hold. At this time brothers Josh and Andy Davidson announced that they had decided to leave the band to pursue opportunities outside the music industry.

In November 2020; it was announced that Alex Procter (guitar) and Trent Jackson (bass) would join the band. A new album release in 2021 was also mentioned.

=== World I Understand (2021) ===
The new quartet spent three weeks at Rockfield Studios in Monmouthshire in summer 2021. There, in the Coach House, they recorded the band's third studio album with one of the country's top music producers Dave Eringa, who has worked with Manic Street Preachers, Roger Daltrey, Idlewild and The Proclaimers. The band had first worked with Eringa as an unsigned band in 2016 on their single "Will You Be There?".

In October the band went out on a tour to support small independent venues.

Singles "End of the Earth", "Falling" and "City Lights" preceded the release of the new album World I Understand on 19 November 2021.

=== People Like Me and You (2023) ===
On 3 February 2023 the band announced that their upcoming fourth album ‘'People Like Me And You'’ would be released on 11 August 2023, once again on their own Teddyboy Records. They also announced details of their biggest UK headline tour to date.

The band previewed the new album with singles ‘'Sirens'’ (February), ‘'Don’t Let It Out'’ (April), title track ‘'People Like Me And You'’ (May) and opening track ‘'Remember All The Girls'’ (July). ‘'Sirens'’ was named as Jordan & Vick's Tune of the Week before picking up further Radio 1 airplay from Jack Saunders.

In July the band set out on a sold-out tour of small independent venues, something they had also done in 2021.

=== Everything Must Make Sense (2025) ===
On 27 September 2024 the band announced that their upcoming fifth album ‘'Everything Must Make Sense'’ which was released on 21 February 2025, once again on their own Teddyboy Records.

== Discography ==
=== Studio albums ===
- Live for the Moment (2017) No. 6 UK
- Under Your Sky (2019) No. 20 UK
- World I Understand (2021) No. 9 UK
- People Like Me & You (2023) No. 4 UK
- Everything Must Make Sense (2025) No. 4 UK
