= Burntwood Hall =

Country house in Great Houghton, South Yorkshire, England

Coordinates: 53.5781°N 1.3541°W

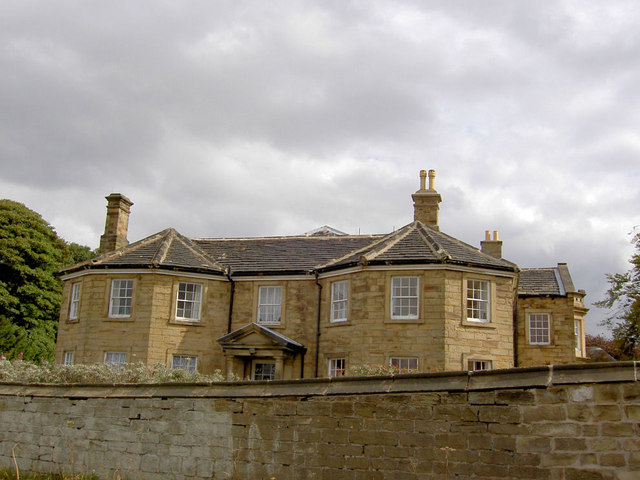
Burntwood Hall

Burntwood Hall is a house that lies near the village of Great Houghton, South Yorkshire, England and has been known as Boomshack and Burntwood Nook/Lodge over the centuries.

== History ==
Originally a modest farmhouse which was bought around 1700 by William Marsden Esq, a highly influential Barnsley attorney and Steward to the 1st Duke of Leeds. He had the house altered to be more suitable for the residence of a gentleman. William Marsden died in 1718 apparently worth £30,000 he left his estates to be divided in certain proportions amongst his children. His son William, succeeded him as attorney of Barnsley and Royal Surveyor of the Woods north of the River Trent to King George III. He too, was a man of great influence, and was a good deal mixed up in the affairs of the town and district.

His Grandson, Captain Francis Marsden – West Yorkshire Militia/5th Regiment of Foot served as a British officer in the early years of the American Revolution. Arriving in Boston in 1774 from Monkstown, Ireland he was initially in command of the Grenadier Company in which he served with Lieutenant Lord Francis Rawdon. He probably participated in the battles of Lexington and Concord but at this time the Grenadier Company was commanded by Captain George Harris (later Baron Harris). The overall command of the regiment at this time fell to Colonel Lord Hugh Percy, later 2nd Duke of Northumberland.

He died at Burntwood on 12 February 1780, aged 27 from wounds received five years before at the Battle of Bunker Hill in 1775. He was buried at Wakefield Cathedral, although his grave has since moved there still stands a wall monument in his memory inside the cathedral. His sister, Hannah Maria who paid for the monument was married to John Carr Esq of Carr Lodge Horbury, who was a nephew to the famous architect, John Carr. Hannah Maria named her son, John Francis Carr in memory of her brother. John Carr of York, John Carr, Hannah Maria and a granddaughter are all buried in the same vault in St Peter and St Leonard's Church, Horbury.

The Marsden family held the Lord of the manor of nearby Bolton on Dearne with Goldthorpe and benefited from the 1761–1767 Inclosure Awards, gaining further land from several of the village commons (Carr, Bolton on Dearne and Goldthorpe among others). The family continued to live mostly in Burntwood, though they had several smaller estates including Newhall, and Kettlethorpe Hall for 150 years. The last being William Henry Marsden, the son of Dr John Marsden who was Vicar of Felkirk and Chaplain to Dr Robert Hay Drummond the Archbishop of York, died at Burntwood in 1815.

Burntwood was then bought by Mr. S. H. Taylor who lived here for around 60 years before selling the estate to the local Dymond family, whom continued to live here until 1961. The Hall was then used for several years as offices for a structural steel company Billington Structures and their sister company Bilcon Projects.

Today Burntwood Hall is a nursing home for the elderly and the kitchen garden is now a centre for disabled people.

== Architecture and grounds ==
The hall is a mixture of classical and Gothic revival architecture and on the south side there is a porch supported by doric columns The grounds originally incorporated both an entrance lodge on the south entrance (though this became neglected and was later demolished) and a stable block (now converted and used as staff accommodation). In 2003 some of the garden ornaments, including the sundial were stolen.

It has the only 'secret' tunnel in the area that can be authenticated, running for thirty yards (27 m) under the road to the kitchen gardens. West Haigh Wood and Howell Wood (now a country park) were landscaped as the grounds of the hall and as a game reserve, as was the open space of the old Burntwood. It is possible that there was once a hunting lodge located within Howell Woods though any visible trace of this is long gone.

Artificial lakes were set in Howell Wood and West Haigh Wood, the one in Howell Wood being the only one surviving today and used as a fishing lake. Next to the lake in Howell Woods remains the 18th century ice house, which is now home to various forms of wildlife.

Howell Wood Country Park is managed by the Metropolitan Borough of Doncaster.
