= George Unwin =

Royal Air Force officer and flying ace (1913–2006)

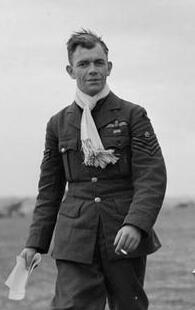
- Unwin in 1940
- Born: 18 January 1913; Bolton upon Dearne, Yorkshire, England
- Died: 28 June 2006 (aged 93); Dorset, England
- Military career
- Allegiance: United Kingdom
- Branch: Royal Air Force
- Service years: 1929–1961
- Rank: Wing Commander
- Nickname: Grumpy
- Service number: 46298
- Unit: No. 19 Squadron
- Commands: No. 84 Squadron (1949–51)
- Conflicts: Second World War; Battle of France; Battle of Britain; Malayan Emergency
- Awards: Distinguished Service Order; Distinguished Flying Medal & Bar

George Cecil Unwin, DSO, DFM & Bar (18 January 1913 – 28 June 2006) was an officer in the Royal Air Force (RAF) and a flying ace of the Second World War. He is credited with destroying at least 15 German aircraft.

From Yorkshire, Unwin joined the RAF in 1929 as an apprentice and served at Uxbridge as a clerk once he had completed his training. He was accepted for flying training, which commenced in 1935, and was posted to No. 19 Squadron as a sergeant pilot. He conducted extensive testing of the Supermarine Spitfire fighter as it entered service with the RAF. He flew extensively during the Battle of France and the subsequent Battle of Britain, destroying a number of aircraft during this period. Much of the remainder of the war was spent as an instructor, although he did serve operationally with No. 613 Squadron for a time. He remained in the RAF in the postwar period, mainly in staff and administrative roles but also leading No. 84 Squadron during the Malayan Emergency. He retired from the RAF in 1961 and settled in Dorset, where he died in 2006, aged 93.

== Early life ==
George Cecil Unwin was born in the town of Bolton upon Dearne, near Barnsley, Yorkshire, on 18 January 1913. From a mining family, he won a scholarship that allowed him to be educated at Wath Grammar School. A lack of funds meant that he could not pursue tertiary studies. He instead enlisted in the Royal Air Force (RAF) in April 1929 as an apprentice clerk at the RAF's records facility at Ruislip. Two years later he was posted as a leading aircraftsman to Uxbridge. In 1935, his application for flight training was accepted and he commencing a flying course at No. 8 Elementary & Reserve Flying Training School at Woodley. He then proceeded to No. 11 Flying Training School at Wittering. Upon completion of his training he was posted to No. 19 Squadron as a sergeant pilot.

At the time, No. 19 Squadron was based at Duxford and operated the Gloster Gauntlet fighter but in August the following year, it began to re-equip with the Supermarine Spitfire fighter. It was the first squadron in the RAF to do so. Unwin was heavily involved in the integration of the Spitfire into RAF service; he was one of five pilots that completed 500 hours of flying time between them during testing. Unwin's flight leader was Flight Lieutenant Harry Broadhurst; he tutored Unwin in firing exercises, noting the chances of success were better at close range. On 9 March 1939 Unwin was flying a Spitfire when its engine failed. As he neared a field that he had selected for landing, he spotted children playing on his intended path of travel; he deliberately crashed his aircraft to avoid them.

== Second World War ==
Following the outbreak of the Second World War, No. 19 Squadron was mostly engaged in convoy patrols but in late May 1940 it moved to Hornchurch from where it was involved in providing aerial cover over the beaches at Dunkirk during Operation Dynamo, the evacuation of the British Expeditionary Force from France.

=== Battle of France ===
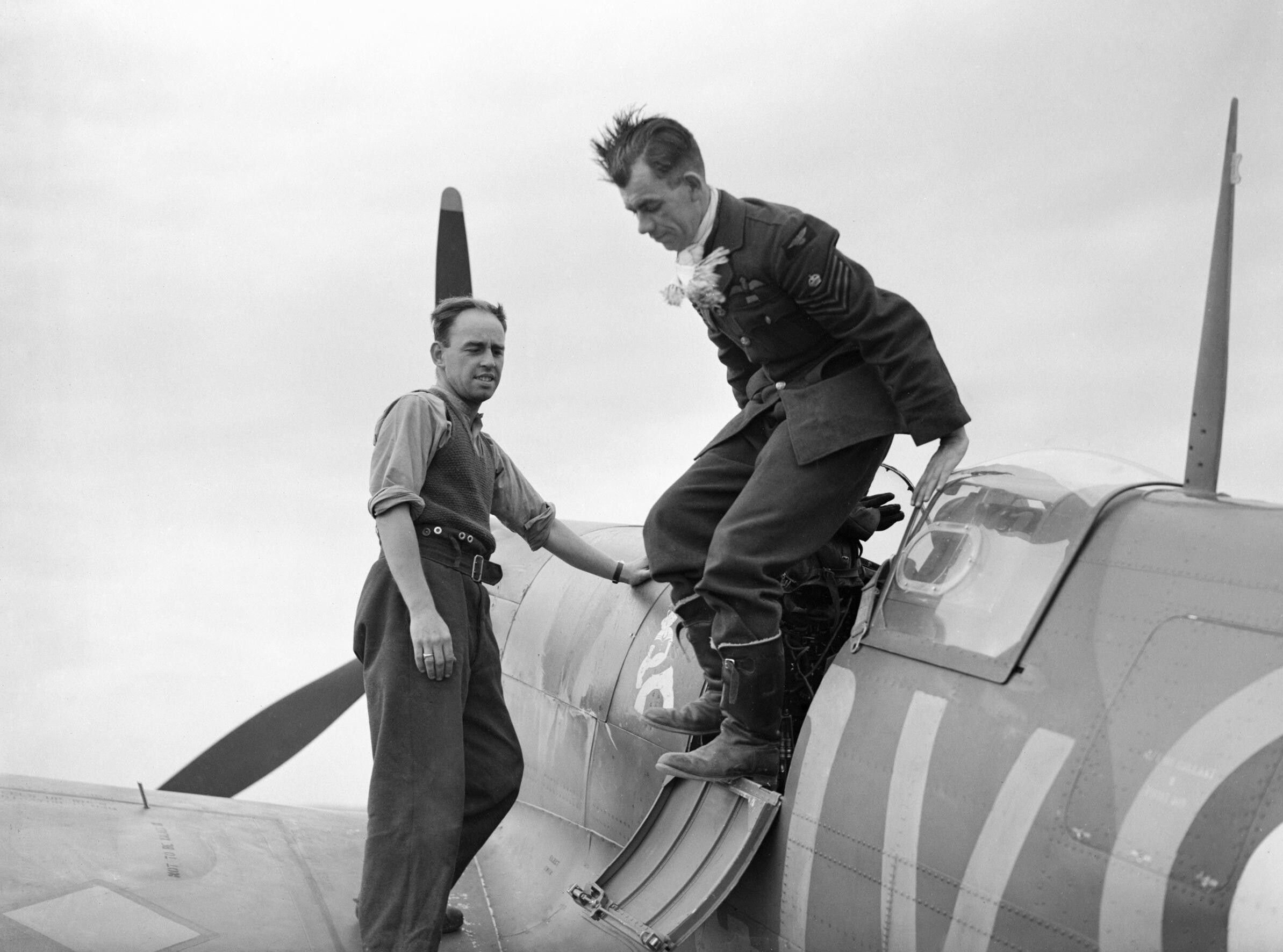
Unwin climbs out of his Spitfire following its landing at Duxford, September 1940

The squadron made its first sortie to France on 26 May but Unwin was forced to miss it due to a lack of serviceable aircraft. His reaction to this led to his nickname of 'Grumpy'. Unwin's first combat sortie came the next day, and he claimed a Henschel Hs 126 reconnaissance aircraft as destroyed over Dunkirk. The German pilot had used his aircraft's slow speed and high manoeuvrability to evade the attacks of two RAF fighters pilots, while retreating into Belgian airspace. The order was given to give up and the squadron turned away. As they did so Unwin saw the German straighten out. Feigning radio failure, Unwin engaged the Hs 126, seeing it burst into flames and crash.

Unwin shot down a Messerschmitt Bf 109 fighter on 28 May, also over Dunkirk. On 1 June Unwin destroyed two Messerschmitt Bf 110 heavy fighters and a Heinkel He 111 medium bomber in the vicinity of Dunkirk, although only one of these, a Bf 110, could be confirmed. After the Dunkirk evacuation was completed in early June, No. 19 Squadron returned to Duxford. Later in June it commenced trials with cannon-equipped Spitfires.

=== Battle of Britain ===
The cannons proved to be unreliable, and this affected No. 19 Squadron's operations in the early stages of the Battle of Britain. After urging from the squadron's commander, it soon reverted to machine-gun equipped aircraft and regularly flew as part of No. 12 Group's Duxford Wing. Unwin shot down one Bf 110 and probably destroyed a second on 16 August; both were encountered to the east of Clacton. He destroyed another Bf 110 on 3 September, this time to the southwest of Colchester. Four days later he shot down a pair of Bf 109s over the Thames estuary. A He 111 was probably destroyed by Unwin on 11 September, the same day he damaged a Dornier Do 17 medium bomber over Gravesend.

On 15 September, now known as Battle of Britain Day, Unwin claimed three Bf 109s destroyed over London. Three days later, he shot down a Bf 110 to the east of Kent. On 27 September Unwin destroyed a Bf 109 over the Thames estuary. Unwin's successes saw him awarded the Distinguished Flying Medal (DFM), the official announcement being made in The London Gazette on 1 October. The published citation read:

This airman has displayed great courage in his attacks against the enemy and has destroyed ten of their aircraft. On a recent occasion, when returning from an engagement alone, he intercepted a formation of enemy bombers escorted by about thirty fighters, and destroyed two of the fighters. He has displayed skill and courage of the highest order.

— London Gazette, No. 34958, 1 October 1940

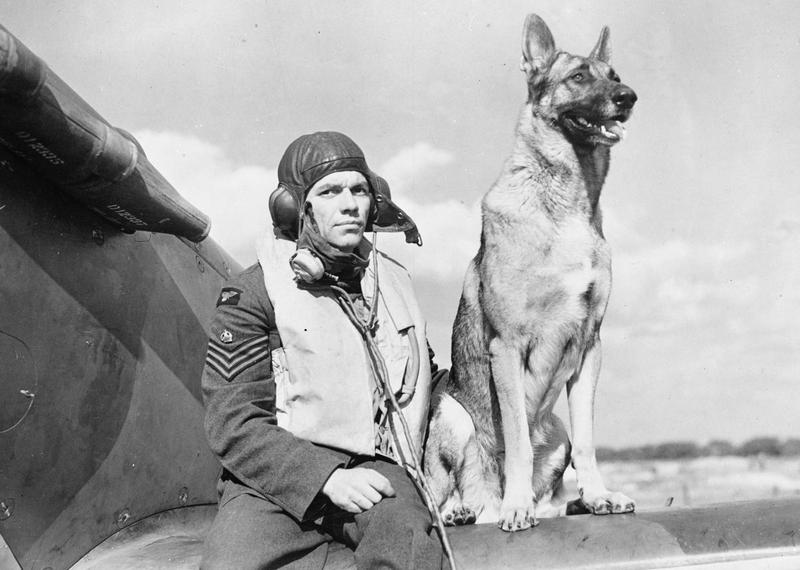
Unwin with Flash, No. 19 Squadron's mascot, September 1940

On 5 November Unwin destroyed a Bf 109 near Dover. He shared with several other pilots in the destruction of a Bf 110 over the Thames estuary on 15 November but afterwards was attacked by Bf 109s. Despite Unwin successfully evading them, a Luftwaffe pilot, Gerhard Schöpfel, alleged that he had shot him down in the engagement. On 28 November, Unwin shared in the shooting down of a Bf 109 to the southeast of Southend. Unwin, who had been promoted to warrant officer, was duly awarded a Bar to his DFM. This was announced on 6 December, the published citation reading:

This airman has shown the greatest keenness, courage and determination to engage the enemy. He is an outstanding fighter pilot and has destroyed a total of thirteen enemy aircraft and assisted in the destruction of others.

— London Gazette, No. 35009, 5 December 1940

=== Later war service ===
Unwin was rested at the end of the year and sent on an instructing course to No. 2 Central Flying School at Cranwell. In February 1941 he was posted to No. 16 Elementary Flying Training School where he instructed trainee pilots. Later in the year he was commissioned as a pilot officer. In March 1942, by which time he held the rank of flying officer, he was posted to No. 2 Flying Instructors School, where he served until October 1943.

Unwin then undertook a conversion course, training on De Havilland Mosquito fighter-bombers at Grantham with No. 12 Advanced Flying Unit before commencing an assignment as an instructor at No. 60 Operation Training Unit. In April 1944 he was posted to No. 613 Squadron, which was based at Lasham and equipped with Mosquitos as part of No. 2 Group. He made a number of sorties as a night intruder over the next six months, being rested in October. He then served at the Central Gunnery School at Catfoss, remaining here for the rest of the war.

== Postwar period ==
Unwin remained in the RAF after the war, with the substantive rank of flight lieutenant. He instructed at Leconfield until June 1946 at which time he was assigned to the Royal Auxiliary Air Force, serving with No. 608 Squadron as an instructor. By this time his substantive rank was made up to squadron leader. For nearly two years, commencing in September 1947, he was a staff officer at various RAF headquarters before being given an operational command, of No. 84 Squadron. His new unit was based in Iraq and operated Bristol Brigand bombers but in April 1950, it was moved to Singapore and became engaged in the Malaya conflict. In August 1951, he broke his leg while playing football and was returned to the United Kingdom. He was subsequently awarded the Distinguished Service Order for his service in Singapore.

On recovery from his injury in June 1952, Unwin was posted to Kirkham where he was involved in administrative duties. He was promoted to wing commander at the start of 1954. He returned to Singapore in mid-1955, when he was assigned to Tengah. His final posting in the RAF, back in the United Kingdom, commenced in May 1958; he was the service's Permanent President of Court Martial. He retired in January 1961.

== Later life ==
Unwin settled in Dorset and worked for the Spastic Society. He was an ardent golfer, playing several times a week well into his eighties. In late May 2006 he was presented with a scale model of his Spitfire by Corgi Toys. He died at Poole Hospital in Dorset on 28 June 2006 at the age of 93. He had no children and his wife Edna had predeceased him.

Unwin is credited with having shot down 15 German aircraft, two being shared with other pilots, in addition to two unconfirmed destroyed aircraft. He also probably destroyed two aircraft and damaged a third. Unwin was featured in an "exhibition about the men and women who lived, worked and fought for their country at RAF Duxford in Cambridgeshire from 1918 to 1961", which opened at Duxford on 28 March 2013.
