= Bolton upon Dearne =

Village in South Yorkshire, England

Coordinates: 53.5197°N 1.31482°W

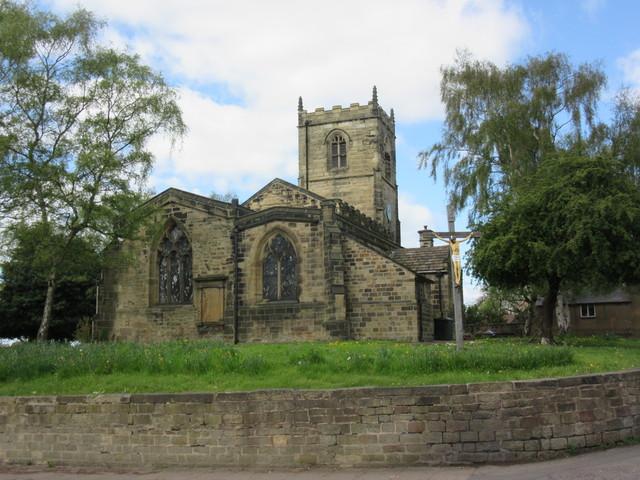
- The Church of St Andrew the Apostle

- Location within South Yorkshire
- Population: 6,744 (2011 Census)
- OS grid reference: SE455027
  - London: 150 mi (240 km) SSE
- Metropolitan borough: Barnsley
- Metropolitan county: South Yorkshire
- Region: Yorkshire and the Humber
- Country: England
- Sovereign state: United Kingdom
- Post town: Rotherham
- Postcode district: S63
- Dialling code: 01709
- Police: South Yorkshire
- Fire: South Yorkshire
- Ambulance: Yorkshire

Bolton upon Dearne is a village in the Metropolitan Borough of Barnsley, South Yorkshire, England, in the part of the Dearne Valley through which the River Dearne passes. Historically part of the West Riding of Yorkshire, it is approximately 7 miles (11 km) east of Barnsley, 10 miles (16 km) west of Doncaster and 8 miles (13 km) north of Rotherham.

== History ==
The name Bolton derives from the Old English bōðltūn meaning 'a collection of buildings'.

Bolton upon Dearne was an ancient parish. It was recorded in the Domesday Book as part of the Manor of Bolton-upon-Dearne with Goldthorpe which was owned by Roger de Busli.

In the early 18th century Barnsley attorney William Henry Marsden Esquire of Burntwood Hall bought the Manor of Bolton on Dearne with Goldthorpe with over 1,000 acres (4 km^{2}) of land for £10,000. Bolton upon Dearne and Goldthorpe are recorded in the 1761–1767 Inclosure Awards. The Marsden family continued to hold the manor until 1815.

Bolton upon Dearne became part of Doncaster Rural District under the Local Government Act 1894 until 1899, when it became a separate urban district. Bolton upon Dearne Urban District was abolished in 1937 under a County Review Order, becoming part of the large Dearne Urban District, along with Thurnscoe and part of Barnburgh parish. On 1 April 1937 the parish was abolished to form Dearne. In 1931 the parish had a population of 14,245. It is now in the unparished area of Dearne. At the 2011 Census the village in the Dearne South Ward of the Barnsley Metropolitan Council had a population of 6,744.

== Facilities ==
The village is served by Bolton-on-Dearne railway station. which is on the Wakefield Line, with services to Leeds, Wakefield Westgate, Rotherham, Meadowhall and Sheffield.

There are three primary schools in the village: Carrfield School, Heather Garth Primary School and Lacewood. The main secondary school in the area is Astrea Academy Dearne, which caters for around 1,200 pupils aged 11 to 16 years.

The Church of St Andrew the Apostle is on the corner of High Street and Angel Street. It was a 10th-century church with alterations made throughout the centuries. There is a Methodist Church on Furlong Road founded in 1832. There was a Roman Catholic church on Station Road. However, this closed in the late 1980s, and became an electrical goods shop.

== Sport ==
The village has two rugby teams. Dearne Valley Bulldogs ARLFC founded in 2001 and Dearne Valley Rufc founded in 2023. Two football teams from the village have competed in the FA Cup: Bolton Athletic F.C. and Bolton United F.C.

== Notable people ==
- George Unwin, sergeant pilot during the Battle of Britain, later wing commander
- The Sherlocks, an indie rock and roll band whose first studio album Live for the Moment (2017) charted at number six in the UK.
- Leslie Binns, mountaineer and former Soldier. Binns, made famous through appearances on TV's This Morning, summited Mount Everest in 2022 on his third attempt. His first two attempts having been abandoned due to weather conditions and, in 2016, to save the life of another climber.

== See also ==
- Listed buildings in Dearne South
