= Church of St Andrew the Apostle, Bolton upon Dearne =

Church of St Andrew the Apostle
- Church of Saint Andrew the Apostle, Bolton upon Dearne
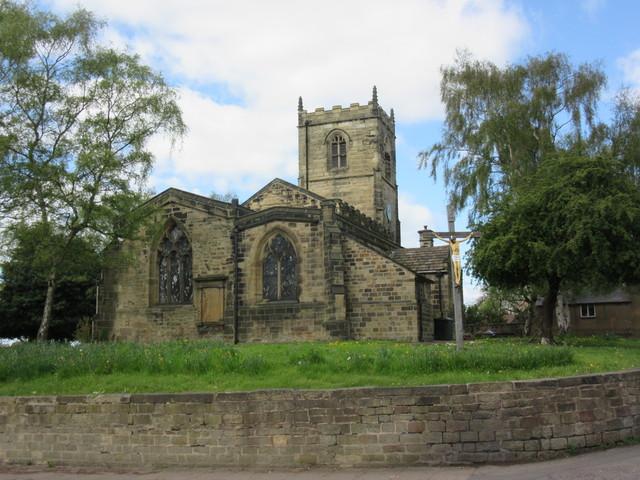
- St Andrew's Church from the south-west
- Church of St Andrew the Apostle
- 53.5197°N 1.31482°W
- OS grid reference: SE 45585 02526
- Address: High Street, Bolton upon Dearne, South Yorkshire, S63 8JB
- Country: England
- Denomination: Church of England

History
- Status: Grade I listed building

Architecture
- Architectural type: Parish church
- Style: Anglo-Saxon and Norman, with Perpendicular additions

Specifications
- Materials: Sandstone rubble and ashlar, Welsh slate roof

Administration
- Diocese: Diocese of Sheffield
- Parish: Goldthorpe and Hickleton with Bolton upon Dearne

The Church of St Andrew the Apostle is an active Church of England parish church located on High Street in Bolton upon Dearne, South Yorkshire, England. The building contains surviving pre-Conquest Anglo-Saxon stonework alongside Norman and late medieval additions. It was designated a Grade I listed building on 14 October 1966.

== History ==
=== Anglo-Saxon origins ===
A church existed on the site prior to the Norman Conquest. Physical evidence survives in the structure of the current nave, where Anglo-Saxon masonry, long-and-short quoin stones, and narrow round-headed window openings remain visible.

The church is documented in the Domesday Book of 1086, which records a church and a priest in the manor of "Boletone", then held by William de Warenne.

=== Medieval to Victorian ===
During the 12th century, the church was expanded with the addition of a north aisle and arcade. The chancel arch was rebuilt in the Norman style, featuring chevron moulding. In the 14th century, the south aisle was added, and the windows were updated with Decorated Gothic tracery.

Further work occurred in the late 15th century, when the west tower and clerestory were constructed in the Perpendicular style. The building underwent restoration in the 19th century, during which timber roofing was repaired and interior seating replaced.

=== 20th-century to present ===
In 1966, the church was granted Grade I listed status in recognition of its early structural survivals.

Due to demographic shifts and declining congregation numbers across the Dearne Valley, the ecclesiastical parish was reorganized. St Andrew's was united into the broader benefice of Goldthorpe and Hickleton with Bolton upon Dearne within the Diocese of Sheffield.

== Architecture and interior ==
=== Exterior ===
The church is constructed from local sandstone, combining rough rubble masonry in the Saxon sections with dressed ashlar in the later medieval additions. The layout comprises a nave with north and south aisles, a two-stage west tower, a chancel, and a south porch.

The lower sections of the nave walls contain Anglo-Saxon masonry, including long-and-short quoins at the corners. The 15th-century tower features battlements, corner pinnacles, and a three-light Perpendicular west window.

=== Interior ===
The interior nave arcade features 12th-century circular piers with scalloped capitals on the north side, contrasting with the 14th-century octagonal piers on the south side.

The font dates from the 12th century, consisting of a simple circular stone bowl on a modern base. The church retains several wall monuments from the 17th and 18th centuries dedicated to local families, including members of the Bingley and St Leger families.
