= Otto Könnecke =

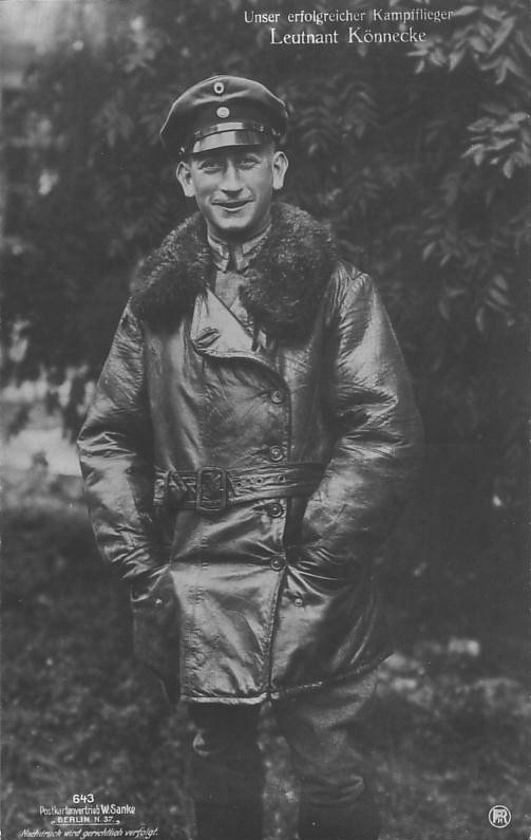
- Otto Könnecke, 1918
- Born: 20 December 1892; Strassberg, Saxony-Anhalt
- Died: 25 January 1956 (aged 63); Bad Aibling
- Military career
- Allegiance: German Empire; Nazi Germany
- Branch: Imperial German Army: Luftstreitkräfte; Luftwaffe
- Service years: 1911–1918; 1935–1945
- Rank: Oberstleutnant
- Units: Jagdstaffel 25; Jagdstaffel 5
- Conflicts: World War I World War II
- Awards: Pour le Merite; Golden Military Merit Cross; Royal House Order of Hohenzollern; Iron Cross
- Other work: Helped found both Deutsche Luft Hansa

Leutnant (later Lieutenant Colonel) Otto Könnecke (20 December 1892 – 25 January 1956) PLM, MMC, HoH, IC, was a leading German fighter ace of World War I with 35 victories. He was one of only five pilots to receive Germany's highest decorations for both enlisted pilot and officer. He later became one of the founding pilots of Deutsche Luft Hansa and assisted in development of the new Luftwaffe.

== Early life ==
Otto Könnecke was a carpenter's son, born on 20 September 1892 in Straßberg. He attended the Building Trade School in Frankfurt am Main and became an apprentice carpenter. He became bored with this life by his late teens and in 1911 enlisted in Railroad Regiment 3, which was at Hanau. In 1913, he applied for pilot training and as an NCO, trained with Fliegerersatz-Abteilung 4 (Replacement Detachment 4) at Metz and received his pilot's wings. He then served in various units and capacities, ending up in Jagdstaffel 25 (Fighter Squadron 25).

== World War I ==
At the outbreak of war he was serving as an instructor, and did not see action until December 1916, when he was sent as a Vizefeldwebel to Macedonia as part of Jagdstaffel 25. He had an unconfirmed victory on 9 January 1917 and a confirmed victory on 5 February 1917, and again the following day.

At the end of April, he was transferred to Jagdstaffel 5 on the Western Front. He did not have another victory until 28 May. He accumulated single victories over enemy aircraft until his score stood at 11 by the end of 1917. He often flew in conjunction with two other non-commissioned officers, Fritz Rumey and Josef Mai. The three aces, dubbed the Golden Triumvirate because all three had won the Golden Military Merit Cross, eventually scored 108 victories, or more than 40% of the Jasta's triumphs.

His personal Albatros D.V during this period had one of the more fanciful paint schemes of the war. Its base color was green fuselage, tail, and elevators with a red propeller spinner. His insignia of black and white checkerboarding edged in red adorned the fuselage just ahead of the Maltese crosses, with a thin red line ringing the fuselage just before the tail.

Könnecke continued the same pattern of single victories through 1918 until 30 May, when he shot down a double. On 8 August, he tallied three victories in three separate combats, at 9:05 am, 11:45 am, and 6:45 pm. The following day, he scored three more. On 14 August, he shot down two British aces in a Bristol F.2 Fighter, Eugene Coler and Cyril Gladman, for his 31st win.

Könnecke had been awarded a Golden Military Merit Cross while still a Vizefeldwebel; this was the highest decoration for valor an enlisted man could receive. On 15 June 1918, he was commissioned as a Leutnant. On 20 July, he was awarded the Knight's Cross with Swords of the Royal House Order of Hohenzollern. On 26 September 1918, the day before his comrade Fritz Rumey was killed in action, Könnecke was awarded Germany's highest decoration, the Pour le Mérite or Blue Max. He was one of the few former NCOs to receive the Blue Max, and one of only five pilots awarded both the Golden Military Merit Cross and the Blue Max.

He scored his 35th and final victory on 4 November 1918.

== Post World War I ==
Könnecke was a pioneer of civilian air passenger transport. He joined Deutsche Luft Hansa in 1926 as one of its original pilots.

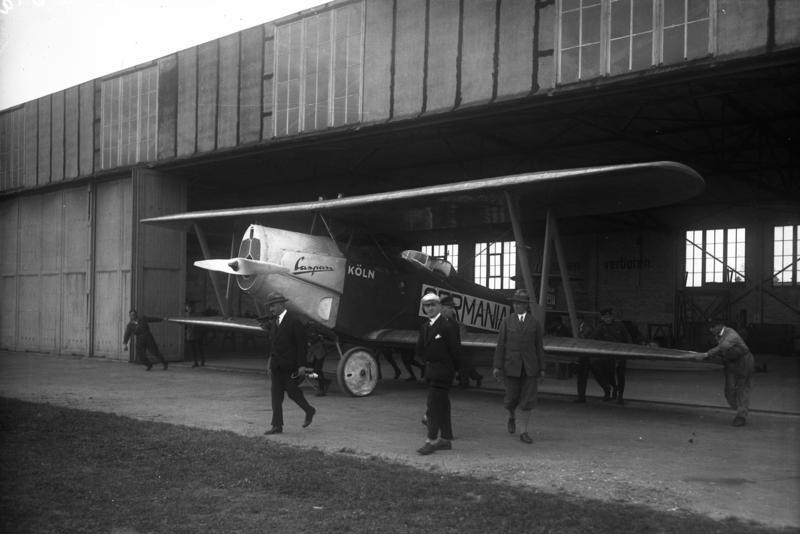

In 1927, he attempted to fly the Atlantic Ocean from Europe to North America, with the aim of establishing a commercial passenger route. His chosen plane was a Caspar C32, dubbed "Germania". This biplane crop-duster was extensively modified to give it a 50-hour flight endurance. The project intended to launch from Cologne cross the Atlantic via the British Isles, Greenland, and into Newfoundland. A storm system over the North Atlantic made Könnecke decide to reach America by a longer route. On 20 September 1927, he left with a planned route over Hungary, Romania, Turkey, and Persia to India. From there, his planned route was via Korea, Japan, and the Kamchatka Peninsula to the American West Coast. Once in America, he would fly on to New York and thence home to Germany. Problems with both plane and crew doomed the effort, which got no further than Calcutta.

He was an influential figure in post-war German aviation, and in 1935 he was asked to help develop the new Luftwaffe. He rejoined the German military to command the Flying School at Scrau. He continued to serve during World War II and ended his military career as a Lieutenant Colonel.

He died in Bad Aibling in 1956, aged 64 years.
