= Jagdstaffel 5 =

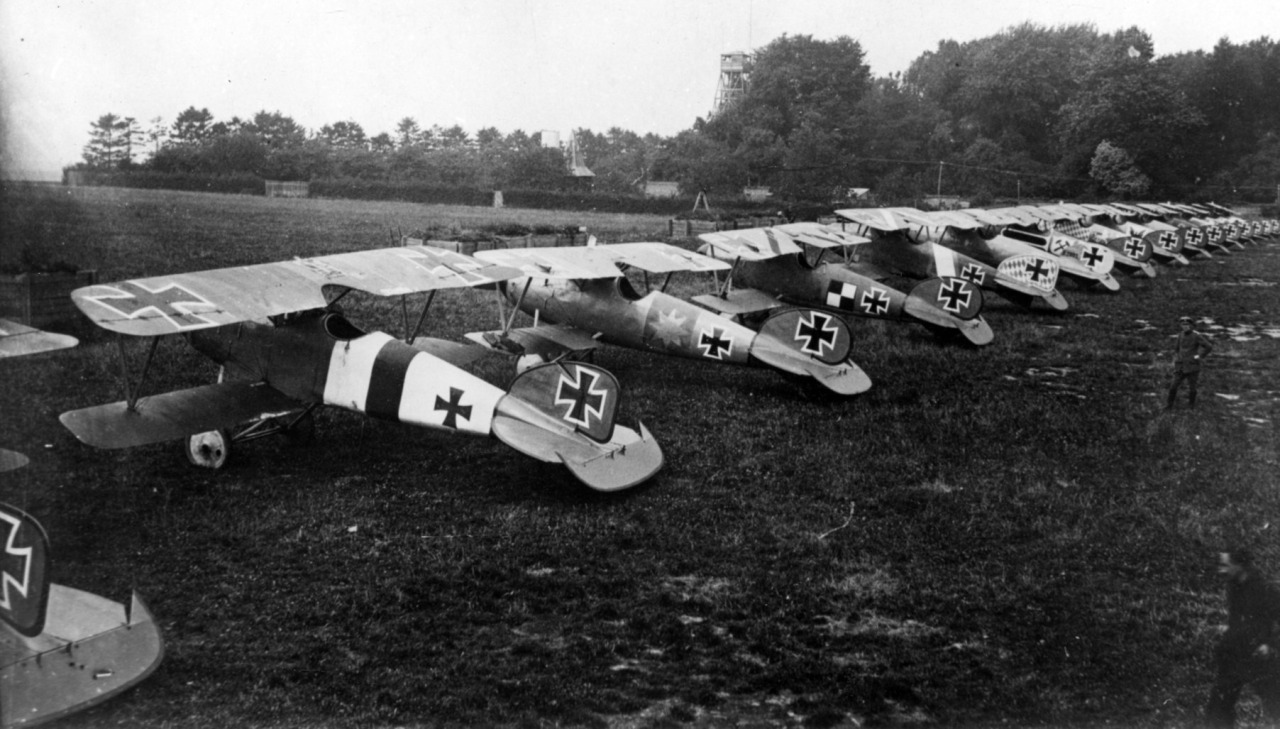
- Jagdstaffel 5 flight line (1 September 1917)
- Active: 1916–1918
- Country: German Empire
- Branch: Luftstreitkräfte
- Type: Fighter squadron
- Nicknames: "Greentails"; "Green-Tailed Devils"
- Colors: Green tails with red piping; red nose; various personal fuselage insignia
- Engagements: World War I
- Website: http://www.jasta5.org

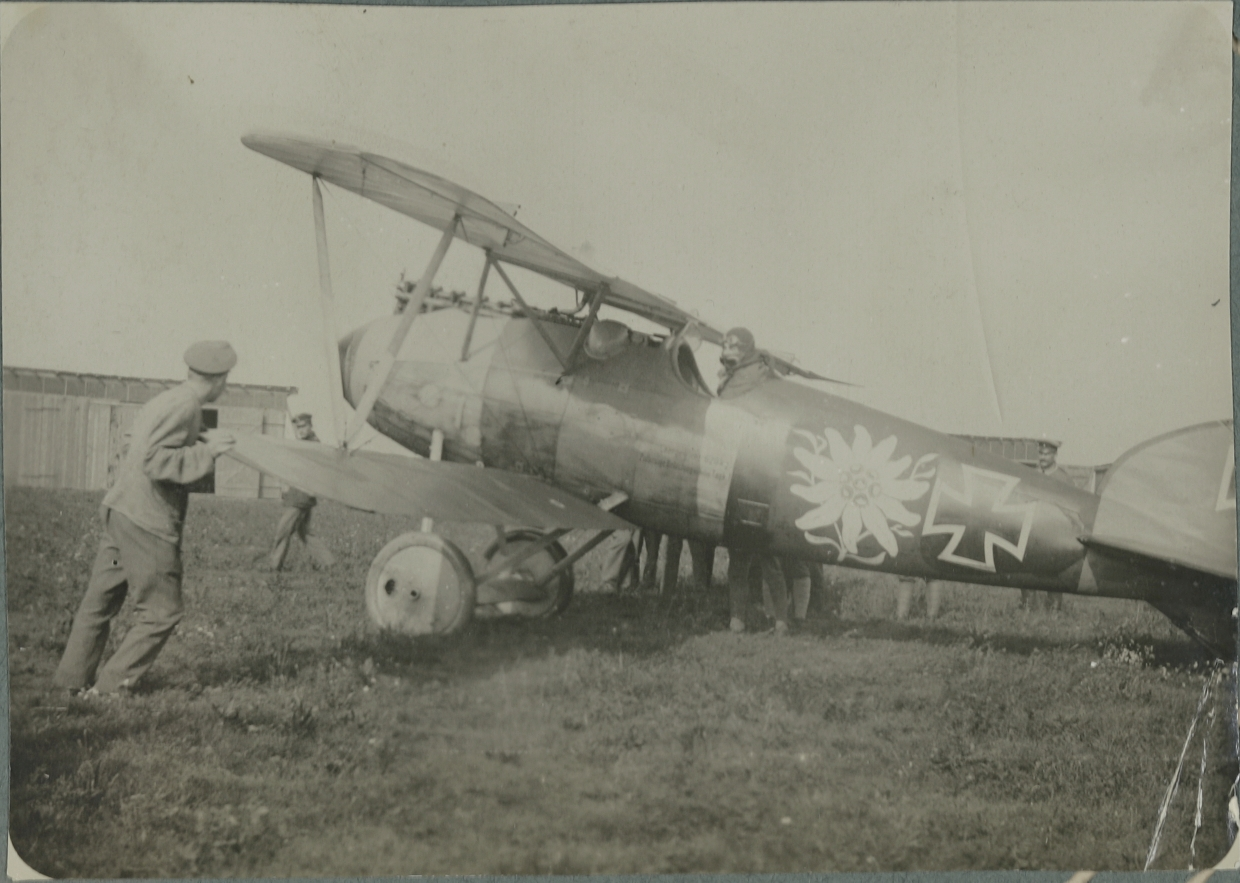
Paul Bäumer's Albatros D.V fighter aircraft, 1917

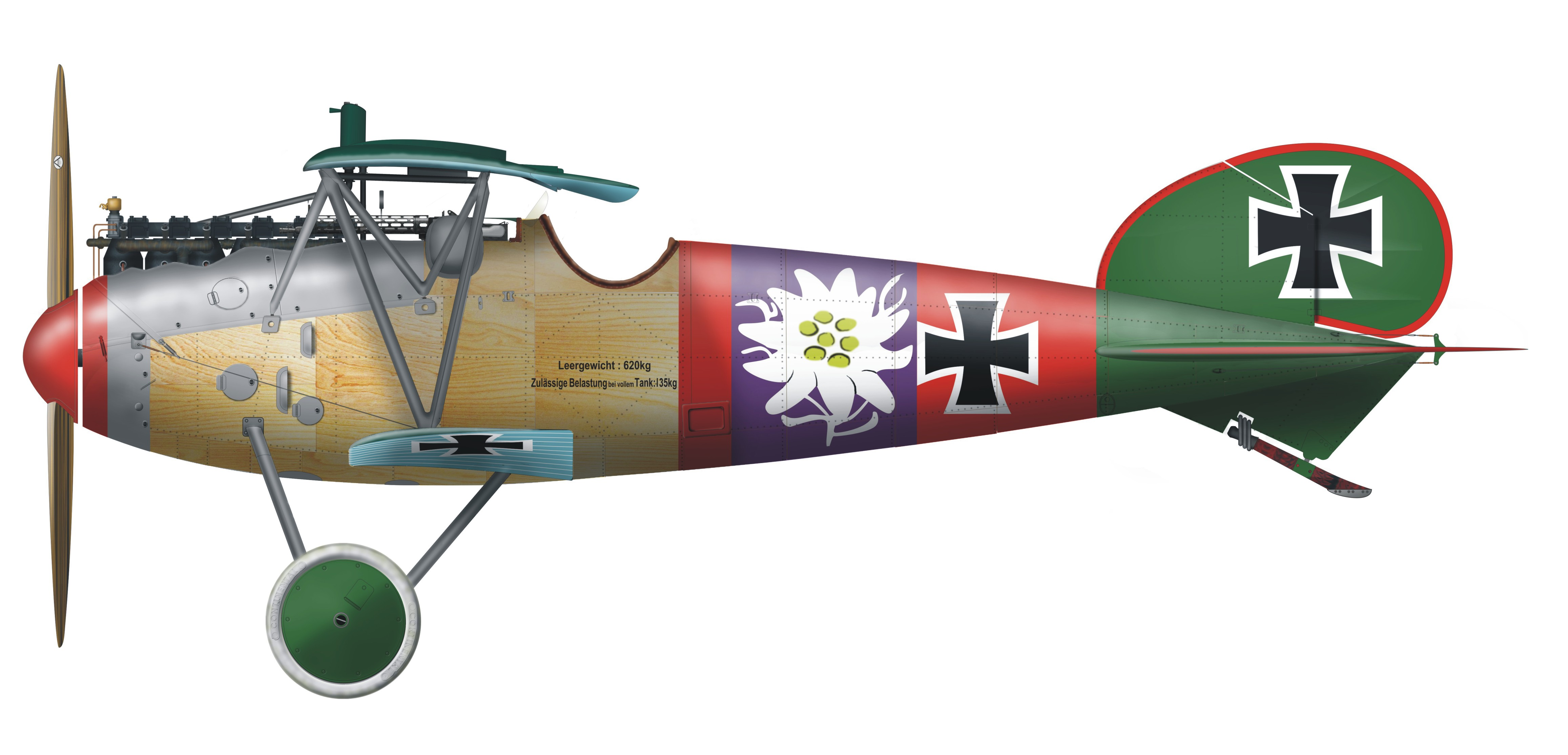
Albatros D.V, Paul Bäumer, Jasta 5

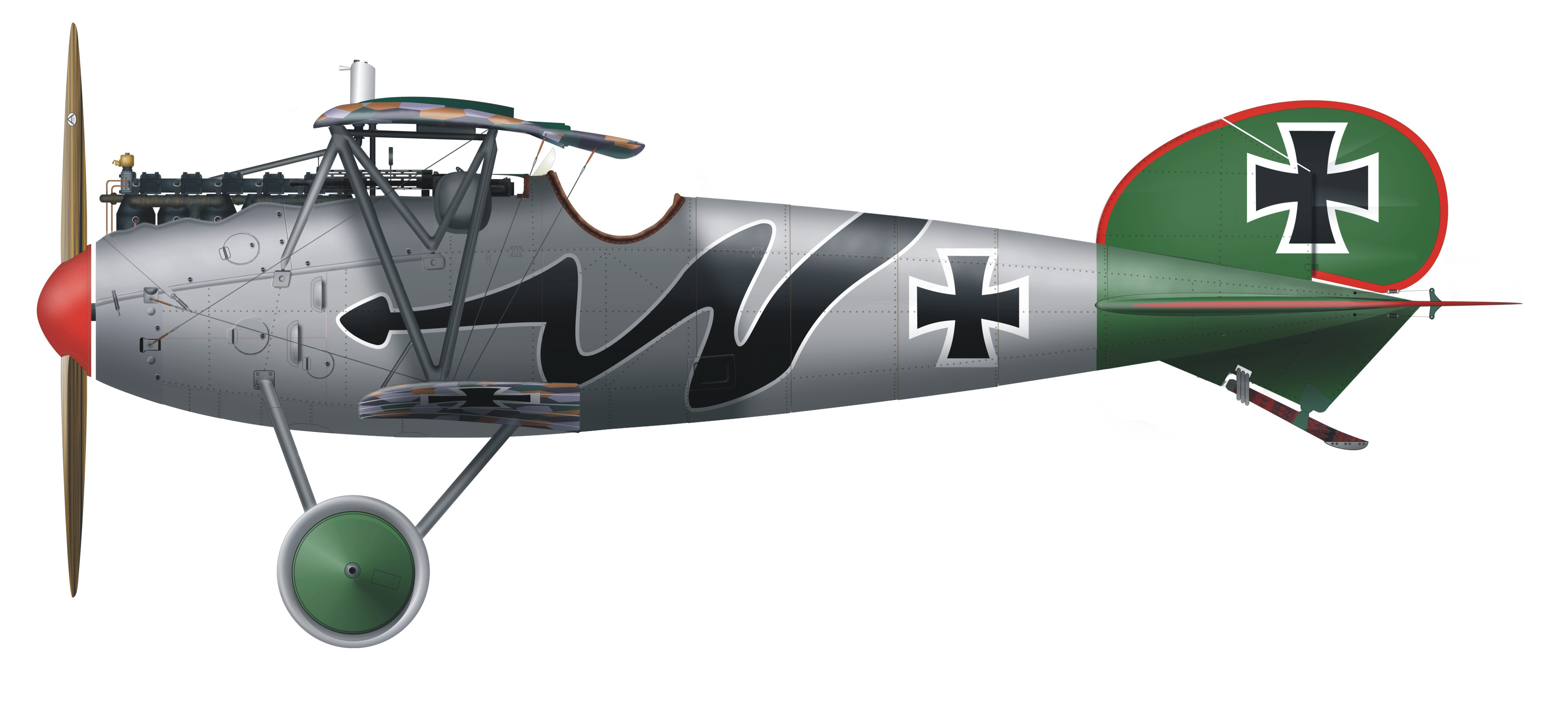
Albatros D.Va, Hans von Hippel, Jasta 5

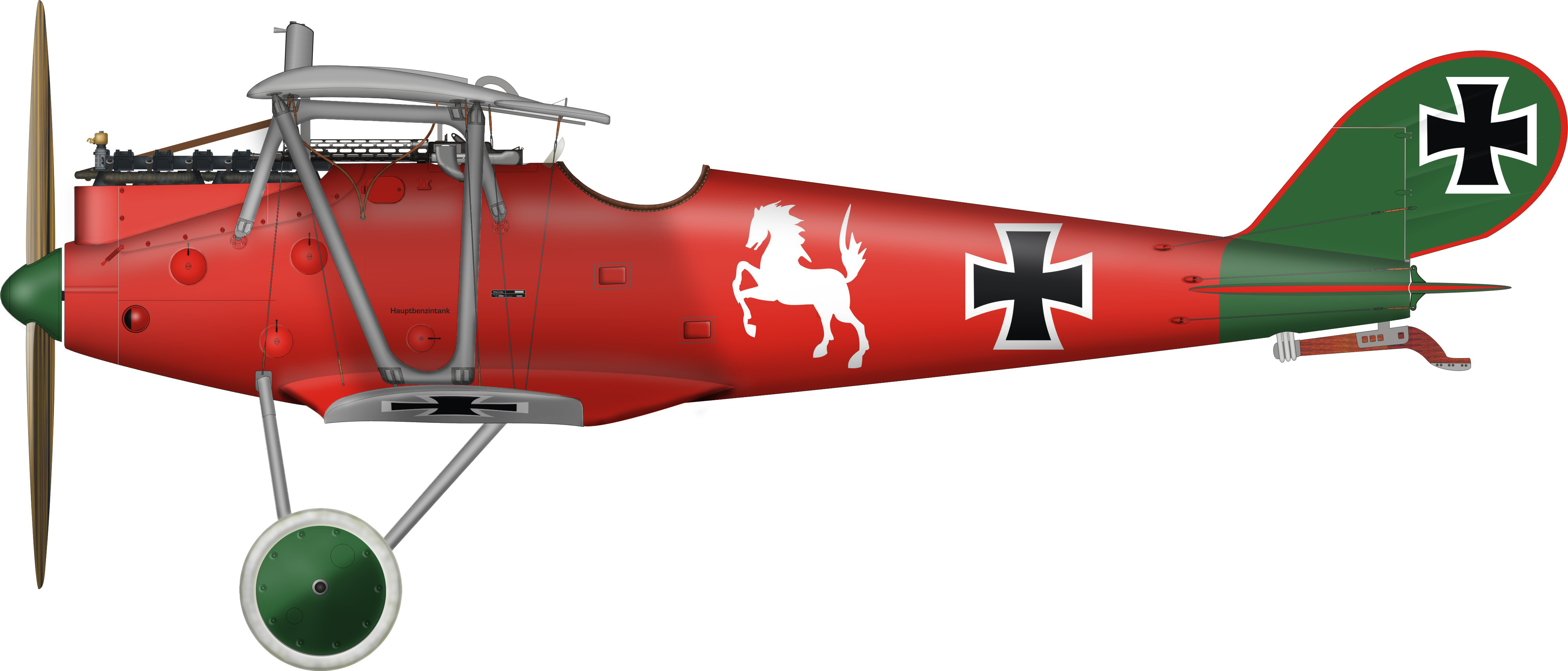
Pfalz D.IIIa, Jasta 5

== History ==
Royal Prussian Jagdstaffel 5, commonly abbreviated to Jasta 5, was created on 21 January 1916, and mobilized on 21 August 1916, as one of the first fighter units of the Luftstreitkräfte, the air arm of the Imperial German Army during World War I. Many of the first pilots of the Jasta came out of KEK Avillers, itself an early attempt to organize and utilize fighter planes as winged weapons. Jasta 5 began its service career at Bechamp near Verdun, in support of 5 Armee. On 29 September 1916, it moved to the Somme to the 1 Armee area of operations. On 11 March 1917, Jasta 5 moved into Boistrancourt; it spent the next year operating from there, in support of the 2 Armee. In March 1918, the Jasta was joined by Jasta 46 thus forming the beginning of Jagdgruppe 2; the new JG was commanded by Flashar, along with his command of the Jasta. In July, command passed to Otto Schmidt; in August, it was joined in the JG by Jasta 34 and Jasta 37. With approximately 253 victories at war's end, Jasta 5 had the third-highest victory total of any squadron in the Luftstreitkräfte. Its casualties came to 19 pilots killed in action, 3 killed in flying accidents, 8 wounded in action, and 1 injured in an accident.

== Commanding officers ==
- Hans Berr: 21 August 1916 – 2 January 1917
- Ludwig Dornheim: 2 January 1917 – 5 February 1917
- Hans Berr: 5 February 1917 – 6 April 1917 (KIA)
- Hans von Hünerbein: 7 April 1917 – 4 May 1917 (KIA)
- Kurt Schneider: 6 May 1917 – 5 June 1917 (WIA)
- Richard Flashar: 10 June 1917 – 31 December 1917
- Wilhelm Lehmann: 31 December 1917 – 14 January 1918
- Richard Flashar: 14 January 1918 – 12 May 1918
- Wilhelm Lehmann: 12 May 1918 – 26 June 1918 (KIA)
- Otto Schmidt: 3 July 1918 – 11 November 1918

== Duty stations (airfields) ==
- Bechamp: 21 August 1916 – 25 September 1916
- Bellevue Ferme, Senon: 26 September 1916 – 29 September 1916
- Gonnelieu: 30 September 1916 – 10 March 1917
- Boistrancourt: 11 March 1917 – 25 March 1918
- Lieramont: 25 March 1918 – 23 April 1918
- Cappy-sur-Somme: 23 April 1918 – 27 July 1918
- Moislains: 27 July 1918 – 24 August 1918
- Nurlu: 24 August 1918 – 30 September 1918
- Neuville: 30 September 1918 – 7 October 1918
- Escarmain by Capelle: 7 October 1918 – 10 October 1918
- Villers-Sire-Nicole: 10 October 1918 – 11 November 1918

== Personnel ==
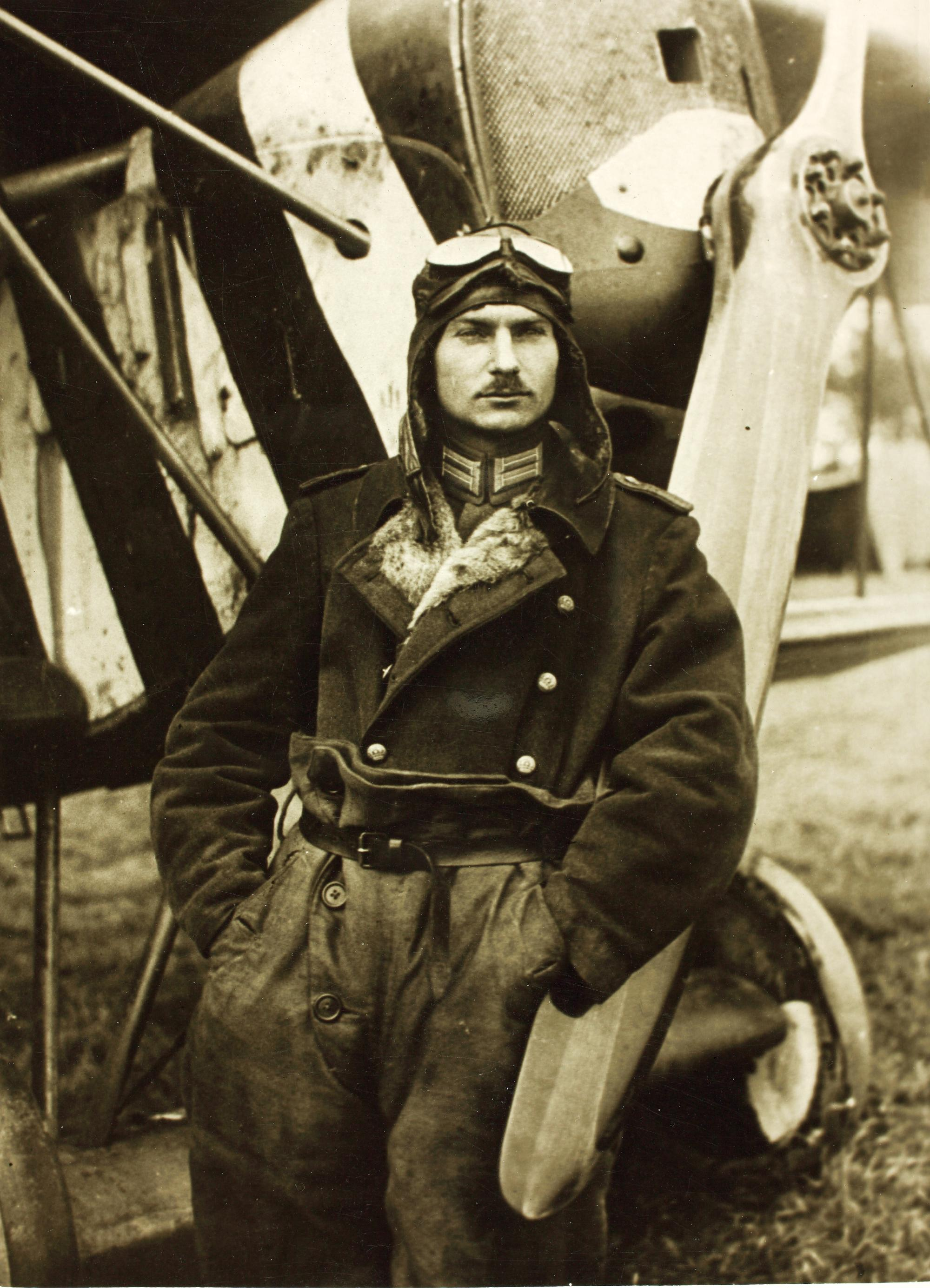
Josef Mai, 30 victory ace

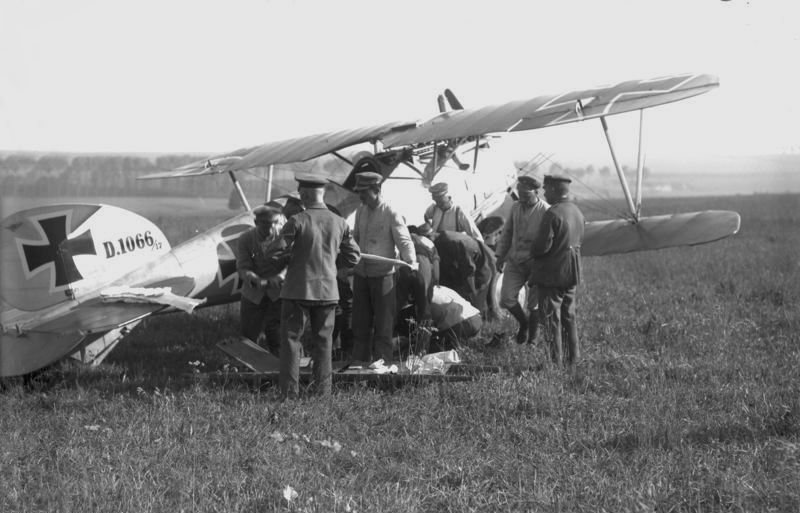
Jasta 5 ace Kurt Schneider (aviator) being removed from his Albatros D.V aircraft D.1066/17 on 5 June 1917 after a dogfight with No. 22 Squadron RFC. Schneider died of wounds on 14 July 1917.

There were several notable pilots and flying aces who served and scored with Jasta 5. Pilots earning Prussia's highest decoration for valor, the Pour le Mèrite ("Blue Max") who served at one time or another in Jasta 5 included (alphabetically):

- Paul Bäumer
- Hans Berr
- Heinrich Gontermann
- Hermann Göring
- Otto Könnecke
- Bruno Loerzer
- Fritz Rumey
- Werner Voss
- Adoracion Matias

Könnecke and Rumey were two of the three members of the "golden triumvirate", who were responsible for 40% of the total victories of the Jasta. The third member of the triumvirate not listed is Josef Mai, who although nominated and eligible for the award, was not officially awarded the Pour le Mèrite prior to the end of hostilities.

One member of Jasta 5 was rocket expert Rudolf Nebel.

== Aircraft and operations ==
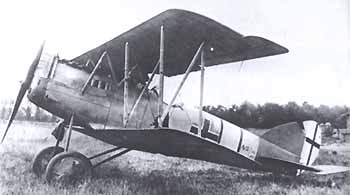
Jasta 5 also used the Pfalz D.XII

The squadron was originally equipped with Fokker Eindeckers. It progressed to use of Albatros D.IIs and Halberstadt D.IIs. In 1917, it was using Albatros D.IIIs and Albatros D.Vs. In 1918, it used both the Fokker D.VII and the Fokker Triplane. At one time, the Jasta was one of only three squadrons not belonging to a Jagdgeschwader (fighter wing) that was totally equipped with the Triplane. It also reputedly operated the Pfalz D.XII, which entered service in July 1918.
