= Fritz Rumey =

German flying ace (1891–1918)

- Fritz Rumey
- Born: 3 March 1891; Königsberg, Germany
- Died: 27 September 1918 (aged 27); Neuville-Saint-Rémy, France
- Military career
- Allegiance: German Empire
- Branch: Luftstreitkräfte
- Service years: 1914–1918
- Rank: Leutnant
- Units: Flieger-Abteilung (Artillerie) 19, Jagdstaffel Boelcke, Jagdstaffel 5
- Awards: Pour le Mérite; Military Merit Cross; Iron Cross

Leutnant Fritz Rumey (3 March 1891 – 27 September 1918) Pour le Mérite, Golden Military Merit Cross was a German fighter pilot in the First World War, credited with 45 victories. He was one of only five German soldiers who won both of the highest German awards for valor, the Military Merit Cross and the Pour le Mérite.

== Early life ==
Fritz Rumey was born on 3 March 1891 in Königsberg, Kingdom of Prussia, German Empire.

== Military service ==
He joined the pre-war the Prussian 45th Infantry regiment as an infantryman. During the first year of WWI he saw action against the Russian Army on the Eastern Front and was decorated with the Iron Cross 2nd class. Subsequently in August 1915 he applied for aviation duty and completed an observer's course and served with Fliegerabteilung (Artillerie) 219. Later he was accepted for pilot training and when he completed his training, he was sent to France in early 1917, serving for a brief period with Jasta Boelcke, and then went to Jagdstaffel 5 on 10 June 1917. He served as a Vizefeldwebel, along with Josef Mai and Otto Könnecke, two other enlisted pilots. These three friends flew together and scored many of the squadron's 250 successes. In addition to Rumey's 45 eventual confirmed victories, Mai was credited with 30 confirmed and 15 unconfirmed, and Könnecke with 35 more. They were nicknamed "The Golden Triumvirate".

Rumey had his own personal livery painted on his airplane in addition to the squadron colors of a red nose and a green tail edged in red. The remainder of the fuselage, and the wings, were swirled with alternating black and white stripes. Smaller surfaces, such as wheel covers, wheel struts, and cabanes were alternately white and black. Another personal marking on the aircraft he used was a demon's head.

Rumey's first victim was a British observation balloon, flamed on 6 July 1917. The following day, he received the Military Merit Cross. His third was over British ace Captain Gerald Crole of No. 43 Squadron RFC, who was taken prisoner. Rumey was wounded on 25 August 1917, and again on 24 September. By year's end he was credited with five victories.

Rumey continued to accrue single victories throughout the first half of 1918. He killed ace Lt. James Dawe of No. 24 Squadron on 7 June 1918, for his 23rd claim. This same day he was commissioned as a leutnant. He brought down and killed Canadian ace Lt. Edward Carter Eaton on 26 June 1918.

With 29 victories to his credit, Leutnant Rumey received the coveted Pour le Mérite on 10 July 1918. This made him one of only five pilots to have received both this award and the Golden Military Merit Cross. He went scoreless in August but in September, shot down 16 aircraft.

== Death ==
Rumey was killed in action on 27 September 1918, during a dogfight over Neuville-Saint-Rémy, France. It is believed his plane collided with a British Royal Aircraft Factory SE.5a flown by G. E. B. Lawson. Rumey plunged to his death when his parachute failed to open.
