= Bartholomew (name) =

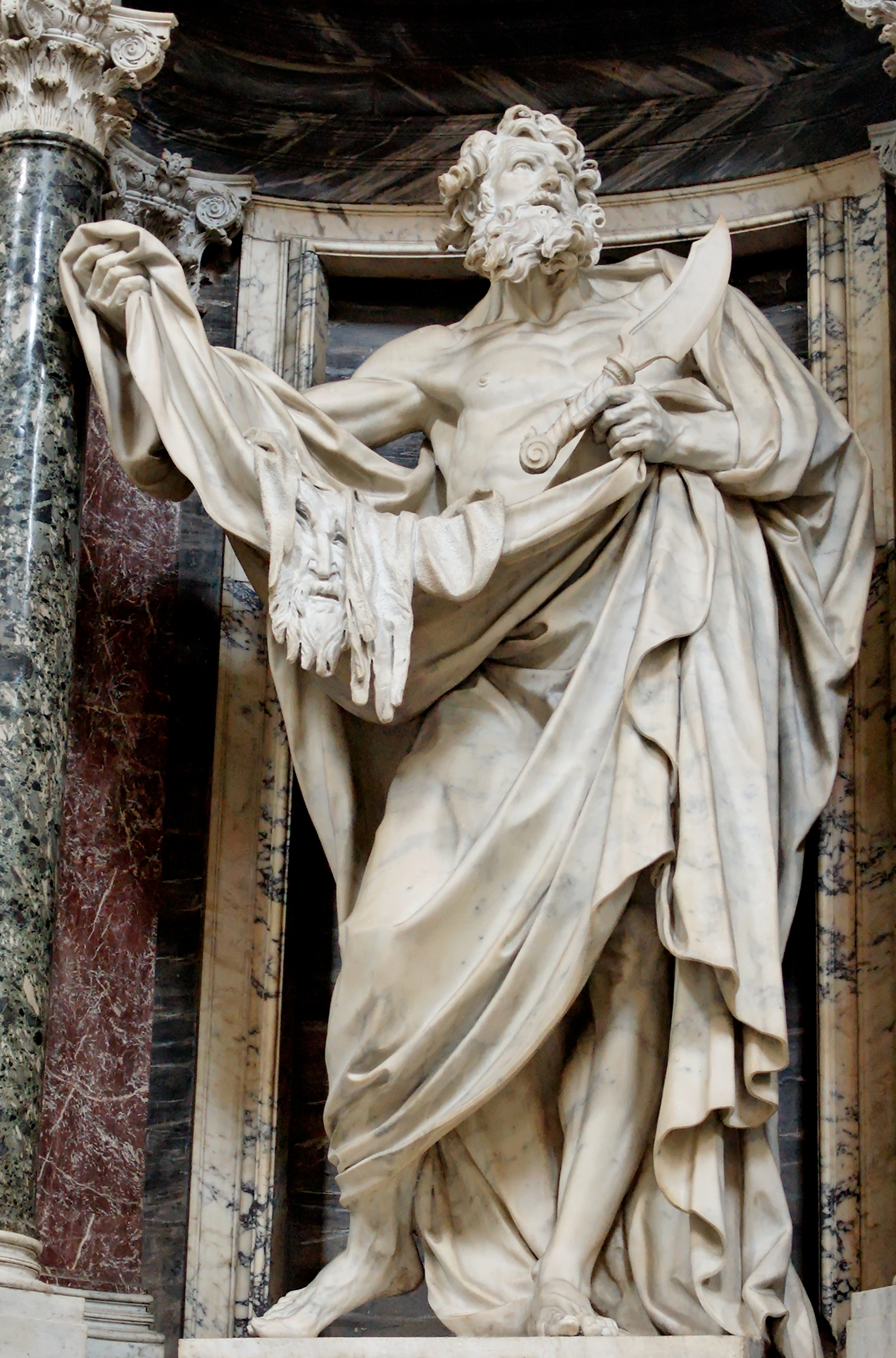
- Statue of Bartholomew the Apostle
- Pronunciation: originally /ˈbɑːrtəlmi/, now commonly /bɑːrˈθɒləmjuː/
- Gender: Male
- Language: Aramaic, Hebrew
- Name day: August 24 (Western), June 11 (Eastern)

Origin
- Origin: Ancient Israel
- Meaning: son of Talmai
- Region of origin: Canaan

Other names
- Related names: Bart (diminutive), Barth, Barry (diminutive), Barthélemy, Bartholomäus, Bartholomeus, Bartłomiej, Bartolomé, Bartoloměj, Bartolomeo, Bartolomeu, Bertalan, Ptolemy, Talmai, Varfolomey, Vartholomaios

Bartholomew is a Jewish (generally also Christian) given name that derives from the Aramaic name meaning "son of Talmai". Bar is Aramaic for "son", and marks patronyms. Talmai either comes from telem "furrow" or is a Hebrew version of Ptolemy. Thus, Bartholomew is either "son of furrows" (i.e., rich in land) or "son of Ptolemy".

Is English and Scots it's often shortened to Barry or Bart.

== In other languages ==
- Albanian: Bartolomeu
- Amharic: በርተሎሜዎስ (Berteloméwos)
- Arabic: بَرثُولَماوُس (Barthūlamāwus)
- Aragonese: Bertolomeu
- Aramaic: בר-תולמי (Bar-Tolmi), Tolmi's son
  - Assyrian Neo-Aramaic: ܒܲܪ ܬܘܼܡܠܲܝ (Bar Tulmay)
- Armenian: Բարթողիմէոս (Partoghimeos), IPA: [pʰɑɾtʰɔʁimɛjɔs], Բարդուղիմեոս (Bardughimeos)
- Azerbaijani: Bartolumay
- Basque: Bartolome
- Belarusian: Варфаламей (Varfalamiej)
- Bengali: বর্থলময় (Barthalamaẏa)
- Bulgarian: Вартоломей (Vartolomeĭ)
- Catalan: Bartomeu, Bartolomé, Bertomeu, Tomeu
- Cebuano: Bartolome
- Chinese: 巴多羅買 (pronounced Baduoluomai); 白 (meaning "white", pronounced Pak in Wade-Giles Cantonese or Bái in Pinyin Mandarin) as a single-character family name
- Croatian: Bartolomej, Bartol, Bartul
- Czech: Bartoloměj
- Danish: Bartolomæus
- Dutch: Bartholomeus
- English: Bartholomew (full name/formal); Bart (diminutive)
- Esperanto: Bartolomé
- Faroese: Bartal
- Finnish: Perttu, Pertteli or Pärttyli
- French: Barthélemy
- Galician: Bartolomeu
- Georgian: ბართლომე (Bart’lome)
- German: Bartholomäus
- Greek: Βαρθολομαίος (Bartholomaios, Vartholomaios, Vartholomaíos)
- Haitian Creole: Batèlmi
- Hebrew: נתנאל (Netan-el), which means "God has given"; בר-תלמי (Bar-Talmai), meaning Talmai's son
- Hungarian: Bertalan (given name), Bartal, Bartos, Bartó (last names)
- Icelandic: Bartólómeus
- Indonesian: Bartolomeus
- Irish: Bairtliméad or Parthálan (Parthálan is etymologically unrelated to Bartholomew)
- Italian: Bartolomeo
- Japanese: バーソロミュー (Bāsoromyū, used in transcription from English name), バルトロマイ (Barutoromai, most popular transcription in Japanese Bible etc.), ワルフォロメイ (Waruforomei, only used in Japanese Orthodox Church)
- Javanese: Bartholomayo
- Kannada: ಬಾರ್ಥೊಲೊಮೆವ್ (Bārtholomev)
- Korean: 바르톨로메오 (Baleutollomyu) (learned); 바돌로메(vernacular)
- Latin: Bartholomeus/Bartholomaeus
- Latvian: Bartlomejs
- Lithuanian: Baltramiejus
- Low German: Bartholomäus
- Macedonian: Вартоломеј (Bartolomej)
- Maltese: Bartoloméw (learned); Bartilméw (vernacular)
- Māori: Patoromu
- Milanese: Bartolamee
- Nepali: बार्थोलोमाइको (Bārthōlōmā'ikō)
- Norwegian: Bartolomeus
- Persian: بارتولومیو
- Peruvian Spanish: Bartuco (vernacular)
- Polish: Bartłomiej (masculine version), Bartłomieja (feminine version; rare); Bartosz (masculine) is a separate name that derives from Bartłomiej
- Portuguese: Bartolomeu
- Provençal: Barthomieu
- Punjabi: ਬਰਤੁਲਮਈ (Baratulama'ī)
- Romanian: Bartolomeu
- Russian: Варфоломей (Varfolomei, Varfolomey)
- Scottish Gaelic: Pàrlan (etymologically unrelated to Bartholomew)
- Serbian: Вартоломеј (in Serbian Cyrillic), Vartolomej (in Latin script)
- Slovak: Bartolomej
- Slovene: Jernej
- Somali: Bartolomayos
- Spanish: Bartolomé, Bartolomeo
- Swedish: Bartolomaios, Bartolomeus (older transcription)
- Tagalog: Bartolome, isa sa mga disipulo ni Hesus (one of Jesus' Disciples)
- Tamil: பர்த்தலோமிவ் (Parttalōmiv)
- Telugu: బర్తలోమ్యోవ్ (Bartalōmyōv)
- Thai: บาร์โธโลมิ (Bār̒ ṭho lomi)
- Turkish: Bartalmay, Bartolomeus (older transcription)
- Ukrainian: Варфоломій (Varfolomiy)
- Urdu: برتلمائی

== People with the given name ==
- Bartholomew Albizzi (died 1342), Italian Franciscan hagiographer
- Bartholomew the Apostle, Apostle of Jesus
- Bartholomew Ashwood (1622–1680), English Puritan divine
- Bartholomew Badlesmere, 1st Baron Badlesmere (1275–1322), English politician
- Bartholomew Ball (1500–1573), Mayor of Dublin, Ireland
- Bartholomew (bishop of Várad), Hungarian prelate
- Bartholomew (bishop of Veszprém), 13th century Hungarian bishop
- Bartholomew Beale (1621–1674), English bureaucrat
- Bartholomew Crannell Beardsley (1775–1855), Canadian politician
- Bartholomew Binns (1839–1911), 19th-century hangman
- Bartholomew of Bologna (missionary) (died 1333), Dominican missionary and bishop
- Bartholomew of Bologna (philosopher), Italian philosopher
- Bartholomew Booth (1732–1786), American education pioneer
- Bartholomew Boriello (1929–1991), New York mobster
- Bartholomew Des Bosses (1668–1738), Jesuit theologian and philosopher
- Bartholomew Bourchier, 3rd Baron Bourchier (1374–1409), English politician
- Bartholomew Bouverie (1753–1835), British politician
- Bartholomew of Braga (1514–1590), Portuguese Dominican theologian
- Bartholomew of Breganze (c. 1200 – 1271), Italian Catholic bishop
- Bartholomew of Brescia (died 1258), Italian canonist
- Bartholomew Bretherton (1775–1857), British businessman
- Bartholomew Bretherton (jockey) (1812–1866), British jockey
- Bartholomew Broadbent (born 1962), British wine expert
- Bartholomew Burton (1695–1770), British financier, banker and politician
- Bartholomew Yu Chengti (1919–2009), Chinese bishop
- Bartholomew Clerke (1537–1590), 16th-century English jurist and politician
- Bartholomew Columbus (c.1461–1515), Italian explorer
- Bartholomew of San Concordio (1260–1347), Italian jurist
- Bartholomew I of Constantinople (born 1940), Ecumenical Patriarch of Constantinople since 1991
- Bartholomew Crotty (1769–1846), Irish priest and bishop
- Bartholomew Dandridge (1737–1785), American 18th century politician
- Bartholomew Dandridge (artist) (1691–1755), English painter
- Bartholomew Dardanelli (1830–1869), Italian diplomat and entrepreneur
- Bartholomew Diggins (1884–1917), US Navy sailor and Medal of Honor recipient
- Bartholomew Dillon (died 1533), Irish judge
- Bartholomew Dodington (1535–1595), English classical scholar
- Bartholomew Dowling (1823–1863), Irish poet
- Bartholomew Thomas Duhigg, Irish legal antiquary
- Bartholomew of Edessa (1300–1300), Syrian Christian writer
- Bartholomew Burghersh the elder (1250–1355), English nobleman and soldier (died 1355)
- Bartholomew Embriaco (died 1289), nobleman of Genoese origin
- Bartholomew Esmonde (1789–1862), (1789-1862)
- Bartholomew J. Eustace (1887–1956), American prelate
- Bartholomew of Exeter, 12th-century Bishop of Exeter
- Bartholomew Fallon, 17th-century Irish goldsmith
- Bartholomew of Farne (died 1193), English Roman Catholic saint
- Bartholomew Frere (1776–1851), English diplomat
- Bartholomew Fussell (1794–1871), American physician and abolitionist
- Bartholomew Gedney (1640–1698), Colonial military officer, magistrate of the Salem witch trials
- Bartholomew I Ghisi (1201–1302), Lord of Tinos and Mykonos
- Bartholomew II Ghisi (1201–1341), Latin feudal lord
- Bartholomew Gilbert (1501–1603), Early 1600s mariner and explorer
- Bartholomew Gill (1943–2002), American novelist
- Bartholomew Gosnold (1571–1607), English barrister, explorer, and privateer
- Bartholomew Gracedieu (1657–1715), English politician
- Bartholomew Green (martyr) (1530–1556), English Protestant martyr
- Bartholomew Green Jr. (1699–1751), American printer
- Bartholomew Green Sr. (1666–1732), Early American publisher
- Bartholomew Griffin (1600–1602), English poet
- Bartholomew le Gros (1189–1253), French prelate
- Bartholomew of Grottaferrata (0970–1055), Italian saint
- Bartholomew Gugy (1796–1876), Canadian politician
- Bartholomew F. Guida (1914–1978), American politician
- Bartholomew Gutierrez, 16th-century Augustinian and martyr
- Bartholomew Harris (died 1694), English governor in India
- Bartholomew W. Hogan (1901–1983), United States Navy officer and psychiatrist
- Bartholomew Holzhauser (1613–1658), German priest
- Bartholomew Van Homrigh (1665–1703), Lord Mayor of Dublin, Ireland
- Bartholomew Howlett (1767–1827), English draughtsman and engraver
- Bartholomew James (1752–1828), English naval officer and writer
- Bartholomew John (born 1952), New Zealand actor
- Bartholomew Kemp, 16th-century English politician
- Bartholomew of Krbava (fl. 1400–1425), Croatian manuscript illuminator
- Bartholomew of Krk (1150–1198), Croatian nobleman
- Bartholomew de Sancto Laurentio, Dean of Exeter
- Bartholomew Legate (1575–1612), English anti-trinitarian martyr
- Bartholomew Lloyd (1772–1837), Irish mathematician and academic
- Bartholomew MacCarthy (1843–1904), Irish historian
- Bartholomew Mansel (born 1201), Bishop of Tortosa
- Bartholomew Mastrius (1602–1673), Italian philosopher and theologian
- Bartholomew of Messina, 13th-century Italian translator
- Bartholomew Basanta Miranda (1812–1885), Spanish politician
- Bartholomew F. Moore (1801–1878), American attorney and politician
- Bartholomew Mosse (1712–1759), Irish doctor
- Bartholomew of Neocastro, 13th-century Italian jurist and chronicler
- Bartholomew Newsam (1530–1593), clockmaker
- Bartholomew Nnaji (born 1956), Nigerian politician and scientist
- Bartholomew O'Shaughnessey (born 1789), Irish Chief of the Name
- Bartholomew Ogbeche (born 1984), Nigerian footballer
- Bartholomew Opoku (1990–2010), Ghanaian footballer
- Bartholomew Parapolo (born 1963), Solomon Islands politician
- Bartholomew of Parma, the first recorded astronomy lecturer at the University of Bologna
- Bartholomew Parr (1750–1810), English physician and medical author
- Bartholomew Pearson, Canadian settler
- Bartholomew Price (1818–1898), English mathematician, clergyman and educator
- Bartholomew Purdon (died 1737), Irish politician
- Bartholomew Reade, English goldsmith and politician
- Bartholomew Remov (1888–1935), Russian Greek-Catholic archbishop
- Bartholomew Ringle (1814–1881), American politician
- Bartholomew Rinonico (died c. 1401), Italian Franciscan and chronicler
- Bartholomew Roberts (1682–1722), Welsh pirate
- Bartholomew Le Roux, 1663–1713, silversmith
- Bartholomew Rowley (1764–1811), Royal Navy Admiral
- Bartholomew Ruspini (1728–1813), British dentist and philanthropist
- Bartholomew Sharp (1650–1702), 17th century English buccaneer
- Bartholomew Shower (1658–1701), English lawyer and politician
- Bartholomew Sikes, British excise officer
- Bartholomew Steer (1568–1597), English carpenter and leader of the Oxfordshire Rising of 1596
- Bartholomew James Stubbs (1872–1917), Australian politician
- Bartholomew Sulivan (1810–1890), British naval officer and hydrographer
- Bartholomew Teeling (1774–1798), Irish military officer and nationalist
- Bartholomew Tipping IV (1648–1718), English High Sheriff
- Bartholomew Tookie (born 1568), (c.1568-1635) of Salisbury, Wilts
- Bartholomew Traheron (1510–1558), English Protestant writer and Marian exile
- Bartholomew Ulufa'alu (1997–2000), Prime Minister of Solomon Islands
- Bartholomew Vermuyden, Dutch officer
- Bartholomew Vigors (1644–1722), Anglican priest in Ireland
- Bartholomew Tipping VII (1735–1798), English High Sheriff;
- Bartholomew Voorsanger (born 1937), American architect
- Bartholomew Walsh (1890–1959), Welsh trade unionist
- Bartholomew Webb (born 1650), English organist
- Bartholomew Westley (1596–1680), English ejected minister
- Bartholomew Stanislaus Wilson (1884–1938), Irish Roman Catholic bishop
- Bartholomew Woodlock (1819–1902), Bishop of Ardagh and Clonmacnoise
- Bartholomew Young (fl. 1577–1598), English translator
- Bartholomew Burghersh the younger (1301–1369), English nobleman and soldier

== People with the surname ==
- Agnes Bartholomew (1885–1955), Scottish actress and elocutionist
- Allen Bartholomew (1925–2004), Australian criminologist
- Arthur Bartholomew (illustrator) (1833–1909), English-born Australian engraver
- Arthur Bartholomew (cricketer) (1846–1940), English cricketer and schoolmaster
- Arthur Wollaston Bartholomew (1878–1945), British Army officer
- Arthur H. Bartholomew, mayor of Ansonia, Connecticut
- Augustus Theodore Bartholomew (1882–1933), British bibliographer and librarian
- Benjamin Bartholomew (1752–1812), American politician from Pennsylvania
- Brent Bartholomew (born 1976), former NFL football punter
- Charles L. Bartholomew (1869–1949), American editorial cartoonist
- D.J. Bartholomew (1931–2017), British statistician
- Dave Bartholomew (1918–2019), American musician, composer & promoter
- David Ewen Bartholomew (c. 1767–1821), British naval officer
- Doris Bartholomew (born 1930), American linguist
- Freddie Bartholomew (1924–1992), British actor and filmmaker
- Gavin Bartholomew (born 2003), American football player
- George Bartholomew (inventor) (1848–1933), American inventor of concrete pavement
- George Bartholomew (biologist) (1919–2006), American biologist
- Harland Bartholomew (1889–1989), American urban planner
- Herbert A. Bartholomew (1871–1958), New York politician
- Ian Bartholomew (born 1954), English actor
- Jack Bartholomew (rugby league) (1888–1965), English rugby league footballer
- The noted cartographers of the Edinburgh engraving firm John Bartholomew and Son:
  - John Bartholomew Sr. (1805–1861), the founder
  - John Bartholomew Junior (1831–1893), John Sr.'s son, who developed colour contouring
  - John George Bartholomew (1860–1920), John Junior's son
  - John (Ian) Bartholomew (1890–1962), John George's son
  - John Christopher Bartholomew (1923–2008), Ian's son
- John Eric Bartholomew (1926–1984), birth name of comedian Eric Morecambe
- Joseph Bartholomew (disambiguation)
- Joshua Bartholomew (born 1984), Canadian singer-songwriter
- Kate Bartholomew (1868–1951), American hat designer and manufacturer
- Ken Bartholomew (1920–2012), U.S. speed skater
- Les Bartholomew (1903–1972), American baseball player
- Linda Bartholomew (1949–2010), singer-songwriter
- Lindsay Bartholomew (born 1944), English painter
- Logan Bartholomew (born 1984), American actor
- Matthew Bartholomew (born 1968), Trinidad and Tobago football player
- Pablo Bartholomew (born 1955), Indian photojournalist
- Paul Bartholomew (1883–1973), American architect
- Peter Bartholomew (died 1099), French soldier of the First Crusade
- Phyllis Bartholomew (1914–2002), English long jumper
- Reginald Bartholomew (1936–2012), American diplomat
- Richard Bartholomew (1926–1985), Burmese-Indian art critic and photographer
- Riley Bartholomew (1859–1860), American senator
- Rondell Bartholomew (born 1990), Grenadian sprinter
- Sam Bartholomew, (1917–1999), American NFL fullback
- Shemar Bartholomew (born 2000), American football player
- Summer Bartholomew (born 1951), U.S. model and actress
- Valentine Bartholomew (1799–1879), English painter
- William Bartholomew (British Army officer) (1877–1962), British general
- William Bartholomew (cricketer), English cricketer
- Will Bartholomew (born 1980), American football fullback

== See also ==
- Bartholomew (disambiguation)
