= Bartolomeu =

Bartolomeu is a given name of Portuguese, Galician or Romanian origin. It is a cognate of Bartholomew. Notable people with this name include:

- Bartolomeu Anania – Romanian Orthodox monk who was the Metropolitan of Cluj (1993–2011)
- Bartolomeu Chaves - Brazilian para-athlete
- Bartolomeu Cid dos Santos - Portuguese artist
- Bartolomeu Dias - Portuguese explorer, and the first European navigator to round the southern tip of Africa
- Bartolomeu de Gusmão – Portuguese priest
- Bartolomeu Perestrello – 1st Capitão Donatário, Lord and Governor of the Island of Porto Santo (c. 1395–1457)
- Bartolomeu Português – Portuguese buccaneer
- Bartolomeu Velho – Sixteenth-century Portuguese mapmaker and cosmographer
- Edgar Bartolomeu – Former Angolan professional soccer player

== See also ==
- Barthélemy – French
- Bartholomew – English
- Bartolomeo – Italian
- Bartolomé – Spanish
- São Bartolomeu (disambiguation)
- São Bartolomeu de Messines – a Portuguese Parish in the Municipality (Concelho ) of Silves
- São Bartolomeu de Regatos – a parish in the district of Angra do Heroísmo in the Azores
