= Bartholomew (disambiguation) =

Bartholomew the Apostle was one of the twelve Apostles of Jesus.

Bartholomew may also refer to:

- Bartholomew (name), a given name and family name
- Bartholomew I of Constantinople, Ecumenical Patriarch of Constantinople
- Bayou Bartholomew, a bayou in Arkansas and Louisiana
- Bartholomew County, Indiana
- Bartholomew River, a tributary of the Southwest Miramichi River in the province of New Brunswick, Canada
- Bartholomew School, a secondary school in Eynsham, West Oxfordshire, England
- Bartholomew Township, a township in Lincoln County, Arkansas
- Bartholomew Company, automobile manufacturer of the Glide
- Bartholomew, a song by The Silent Comedy

== See also ==
- Barthélemy (disambiguation)
- Bartholomeus
- Bartolo (disambiguation)
- Bartolomé (disambiguation)
- Bartolomeo
- John Bartholomew and Son, a cartography publisher
- Saint Barthélemy, an island in the Caribbean
- St. Bartholomew's (disambiguation)
- St. Bartholomew's Day massacre (1572)
