= Bartholomeus =

Bartholomeus, Bartholomaeus or Barthelomaeus is a masculine Latin given name, the Latin equivalent of Bartholomew.

The German cognate is Bartholomäus. Notable people with the name include:

- Bartholomeus Amadeus degli Amidei (died 1266), Italian founder of the Servite Order
- Bartholomeus Amicus (1562–1649), Jesuit priest, teacher and writer who spent his adult life in Naples
- Bartholomeus Anglicus (1203–1272), scholastic scholar of Paris, member of the Franciscan order
- Bartholomeus Appelman (1628–1686), Dutch landscape painter
- Bartholomeus Assteyn (1607–1669/1677), Dutch still life painter
- Bartholomeus Barbiers (1743–1808), Dutch landscape painter
- Bartholomeus van Bassen (1590–1652), Dutch painter and architect
- Bartholomeus Jan "Bart" Bok (1906–1983), Dutch-born American astronomer
- Bartholomeus Breenbergh (1598–1657), Dutch painter
- Bartholomaeus of Bruges (died 1356), Flemish physician and natural philosopher
- Bartholomeus Dolendo (c. 1570 – 1626), Dutch engraver, draftsman and goldsmith
- Bartholomeus Eggers (c. 1637 – 1692), Flemish sculptor active in the Dutch Republic
- Bartholomeus Eustachius (died 1574), Italian anatomist
- Bartholomeus de Glanvilla (died c. 1360), English Franciscan friar
- Bartholomeus van der Helst (1613–1670), Dutch portrait painter
- Bartholomeus van Hove (1790–1880), Dutch painter and decorative artist
- Bartholomeus de Jager (fl. 1655), Dutch corsair
- Bartholomeus J.W.M. "Bart" van Hove (1850–1914), Dutch sculptor
- Bartholomeus "Bart" de Ligt (1883–1938), Dutch anarcho-pacifist and antimilitarist
- Bartholomeus Maton (1641–aft.1684), Dutch painter active in Sweden
- Bartholomeus Meyburgh (1624–1708), Dutch portrait and history painter
- Bartholomeus Molenaer (1618–1650), Dutch genre painter
- Bartholomaeus of Neocastro (c.1240–aft.1293), Italian jurist and chronicler
- Bartholomaeus Pitiscus (1561–1613), German trigonometrist, astronomer and theologian
- Jurickson Profar (born 1993), Curaçaoan professional baseball infielder and outfielder
- Bartholomeus Roodenburch (1866–1939), Dutch swimmer
- Bartholomeus Ruloffs (1741–1801), Dutch conductor and composer
- Bartholomeus Spranger (1546–1611), Flemish Mannerist painter, draftsman, and etcher
- Bartholomaeus Stockmann (c. 1550 – 1609), Danish composer
- Bartholomeus Strobel (1591–1650), Silesian painter
- Bartholomeus V. Welser (1484–1561), German banker
- Bartholomeus VI. Welser (1512–1546), German explorer in Venezuela

== See also ==
- Bartholomeus saga postola, Old Norse account of the life of Saint Bartholomew
