= Barthélemy =

Barthélemy, or Barthélémy is a French name, a cognate of Bartholomew. Notable people with this name include:

== Given name ==
- Barthélemy (explorer), French youth who accompanied the explorer de La Salle in 1687
- Barthélémy (singer) (1956–2015), French Polynesian musician
- Barthélemy Adoukonou (1942–2025), Beninese Catholic bishop
- Barthélémy Attisso (1945–2021), Togolese lawyer and guitarist
- Barthélemy Koffi Baugré (born 1949), Ivorian canoeist
- Barthélémy Bisengimana (born 1935), Rwandan politician
- Barthélemy Boganda (1910–1959), Premier of the Central African Republic from 1958 to 1959
- Barthélemy de Chasseneuz (1480–1541), French jurist
- Barthélémy Chinenyeze (born 1998), French volleyball player
- Barthélémy Dias (born 1975), Senegalese politician
- Barthélemy Guibal (1699–1757), French sculptor
- Barthélemy d'Herbelot de Molainville (1625–1695), French Orientalist
- Barthélemy Faujas de Saint-Fond (1741–1819), French geologist and traveler
- Barthélemy Hauréau (Jean-Barthélémy) (1812–1896), French historian and writer
- Barthélémy Kotchy (1934–2019), Ivorian writer and politician
- Barthélemy Mukenge (1925–2018), Congolese politician
- Barthélemy Prosper Enfantin (1796–1864), French social reformer
- Barthélemy Louis Joseph Schérer (1747–1804), French general
- Barthélémy Thomas Strafforello (1764–1845), French politician
- Barthélémy Toguo (born 1967), Cameroonian painter, visual and performing artist
- Barthélemy Vimont (1594–1667), French Jesuit missionary
- Barthélemy Zinga-Pirioua (1917–?), Central African politician, clerk, and interpreter

== Surname or title ==
- Albert Barthélémy (1906–1988), French cyclist
- Anatole Jean-Baptiste Antoine de Barthélemy (1821–1904), French archaeologist and numismatist
- Auguste-Marseille Barthélemy (1796–1867), French satirical poet
- Claude Barthélemy (footballer) (1945–2020), Haitian footballer
- Édouard de Barthélemy (1830–1888), French historian
- Emmanuel Barthélemy (1820–1855), French revolutionary and political exile
- François-Marie, marquis de Barthélemy (c. 1750–1830), French politician
- Honoré Barthélémy (1891–1964), French cyclist
- Jean-Jacques Barthélemy (1716–1795), French writer and numismatist
- Joseph Barthélemy (1874–1945), French politician and journalist
- Jules Barthélemy-Saint-Hilaire (1805–1895), French philosopher and statesman
- Karl Max Barthélémy (born 1986), Chadian footballer
- Laure Barthélémy (born 1988), French cross-country skier
- Matthieu Barthélémy (born 1982), French mountain bike orienteer
- Michel Barthélemy (1638–1706), French missionary
- Nicolas Barthélémy (born 1990), French footballer
- René Barthélemy, (1889–1954), French engineer, co-inventor of television
- Rances Barthelemy, (born 1986), Cuban boxer
- Serisay Barthélémy (born 1984), French footballer
- Sidney Barthelemy, (born 1942), 58th Mayor of New Orleans, Louisiana

== See also ==
- Saint Barthélemy, an island of the Leeward group in the Caribbean
