= Bartholomäus =

- Gender: Male
- Language: German

Bartholomäus is a masculine German given name, the German equivalent of Bartholomew. Notable people with this name include:

- Bartholomäus Aich, 17th century South-German organist and composer
- Bartholomäus Bernhardi of Feldkirchen (1487–1551), rector and a professor of physics and philosophy at the University of Wittenberg
- Bartholomäus Brötzner (born 1957), Austrian wrestler
- Bartholomäus Gesius (c. 1562–1613), German theologian, church musician, composer and hymn writer
- Bartholomäus Herder (1774–1839), founder of the publishing firm Verlag Herder
- Bartholomäus Hopfer (1628–1699), German painter
- Bartholomäus Kalb (born 1949), German politician
- Bartholomäus Keckermann (c. 1572–1608), German writer, Calvinist theologian and philosopher
- Bartholomäus Khöll (1614–1664), imperial master stonemason
- Bartholomäus Kilian (1630–1696), German engraver
- Bartholomäus Metlinger (15th century), German physician
- Bartholomäus Ringwaldt (1532–1599), German didactic poet and Lutheran pastor
- Bartholomäus Sastrow (1520–1603), German official, notary, and mayor of Stralsund
- Bartholomäus Scultetus (1540–1614), mayor of Görlitz, astronomer, cartographer and compiler
- Bartholomäus Zeitblom (c. 1450 – c. 1519), German painter, the chief master of the school of Ulm
- Bartholomäus Ziegenbalg (1682–1719), member of the Lutheran clergy and the first Pietist missionary to India
- Bartholomäus van der Lake (died 1468), German clergyman and author of a chronicle of the city of Soest
- Bartholomäus von Castelmur (c. 1490–1552), Grisons cleric, abbot of St. Luzi in Chur
- Bartholomäus von Stürmer (1787–1863), Austrian diplomat
- Christoph Bartholomäus Anton Migazzi (1714–1803), Prince-Archbishop of Vienna
- Johann Heinrich Bartholomäus Walther (1734–1802), Baltic German architect
