= Bartholomew of Bologna =

Bartholomew of Bologna may refer to:

- Bartholomew of Bologna (philosopher) (died 1294), Italian Franciscan philosopher
- Bartholomew of Bologna (missionary) (died 1333), Dominican missionary sent to Cilician Armenia
- Bartolomeo da Bologna (fl. 1405–1427), Italian composer
