= Bacci (surname) =

Bacci (pronounced [ˈbattʃi]) is an Italian surname derived from the given name Baccio. Notable people with the surname include:

- Alessandro Bacci (born 1995), Italian footballer
- Andrea Bacci (born 1972), Italian race car driver
- Antonio Bacci (1885–1971), Italian Roman Catholic cardinal
- Antonio Bacci (painter) (c. 1600–after 1665), Italian painter
- Baccio Maria Bacci (1888–1974), Italian painter
- Cristiano Bacci (born 1975), Italian footballer
- Edmondo Bacci (1913–1978), Italian painter
- Giancarlo Bacci (1931–2014), Italian footballer
- Giovanni Bacci (1857–1928), Italian journalist and politician
- Guglielmo Bacci (born 1955), Italian football coach
- Icilio Bacci (1879–dis. 1945), Italian irredentist and Fascist politician
- Jacopo Bacci (born 2005), Italian footballer
- Lorenzo Bacci (born 1994), Italian sports shooter
- Luiz Bacci (born 1984), Brazilian journalist and TV host
- Massimo Livi Bacci (born 1936), Italian politician and statistician
- Michele Bacci (born 1970), Italian art historian and academic
- Orazio Bacci (1864–1917), Italian politician
