= Bartholomeusz =

Bartholomeusz is a middle name and surname related to Bartholomeus and Bartholomew. It originates from the Dutch word Bartholomeuszoon meaning the son of Bartholomeus, and may refer to

- Egbert Bartholomeusz Kortenaer (1604–1665), Dutch admiral
- Mark Bartholomeusz (born 1977), Australian rugby union footballer
- Pieter Bartholomeusz Barbiers (1772–1837), Dutch painter
- Ramani Bartholomeusz (1966–1987), Sri Lankan model and actress
