= Baccio =

Baccio (pronounced [ˈbattʃo]) is an Italian masculine given name, the diminutive form of the name Bartolomeo. Notable people with the name include:

== Given name ==
- Baccio d'Agnolo (1462–1543), Italian woodcarver, sculptor and architect
- Baccio Maria Bacci (1888–1974), Italian painter
- Baccio Baldini (1436–1487), Italian goldsmith and engraver
- Baccio Bandinelli (1493–1560), Italian sculptor, draughtsman and painter
- Baccio del Bianco (1604–1657), Italian architect, engineer, scenic designer and painter
- Baccio Ciarpi (1574–1654), Italian painter
- Baccio Lomi (1550–1595), Italian painter
- Baccio da Montelupo (1469–1523), Italian Renaissance sculptor
- Baccio Pontelli (1449–1494), Italian architect
- Baccio della Porta (1472–1517), known as Fra Bartolommeo, Italian painter

== Surname ==
- Agnolo di Baccio d'Agnolo (fl. 16th century), Italian architect
- Nanni di Baccio Bigio (1507–1568), Italian architect
- Paolo Baccio (born 1997), Italian racing cyclist

== See also ==
- Baccio Lake, Emilia-Romagna, Italy
- Bacci (surname)
- Bart (disambiguation)
