= Lloveras =

Lloveras is a Catalan surname. Notable people with this surname include:

- Abner Lloveras (born 1982), Spanish mixed martial artist
- Alexandre Lloveras (born 2000), French para-cyclist
- Bartolomé Lloveras (c. 1890 – c. 1950), Argentine footballer
- Guillermo Venegas Lloveras (1915–1993), Puerto Rican songwriter
- Juan Lloveras (born 1955), Spanish hurdler

== See also ==
- Llovera
