= Arthur Bartholomew =

Arthur Bartholomew may refer to:

- Arthur Bartholomew (illustrator) (1833–1909), English-born Australian engraver, lithographer and natural history illustrator
- Arthur Bartholomew (cricketer) (1846–1940), English cricketer and schoolmaster
- Arthur Bartholomew (British Army officer) (1878–1945)
- Arthur H. Bartholomew, mayor of Ansonia, Connecticut
