= ANZSOC =

ANZSOC may refer to:

- Australian and New Zealand Society of Criminology, established by Allen Bartholomew
- Australian and New Zealand Standard Offence Classification, a standard for criminal offence classification published by the Australian Bureau of Statistics; see Violent crime § Australia
