= Bertalan =

- Gender: Male
- Language: Hungarian
- Name day: 24 August

Origin
- Origin: Variant of Bartholomew
- Region of origin: Hungary

Bertalan is a Hungarian masculine given name, a cognate of Bartholomew. Individuals bearing the name Bertalan include:

- Bertalan Andrásfalvy (born 1931), Hungarian ethnographer and politician
- Bertalan Árkay (1901–1971), Hungarian modernist designer and architect
- Bertalan Bicskei (1944–2011), Hungarian footballer and manager
- Bartolomeu Dragfi (Bertalan Drágffy; fl. 15th-century), Hungarian nobleman
- Bertalan Dunay (1877–1961), Hungarian fencer
- Bertalan Farkas (born 1949), Hungarian cosmonaut and Esperantist
- Bertalan Hajtós (born 1965), Hungarian judoka
- Bertalan Karlovszky (1858–1938), Hungarian painter
- Bertalan Kun (born 1999), Hungarian footballer
- Bertalan Lányi (1851–1921), Hungarian politician and jurist
- Bertalan de Némethy (1911–2002), Hungarian cavalry officer and show jumping coach
- Bertalan Papp (1913–1992), Hungarian fencer
- Bertalan Pintér (born 1973), Hungarian bobsledder
- Bertalan Pór (1880–1964), Hungarian painter
- Bertalan Rubinstein (also known as Bert Ruby; 1910–1967), Hungarian-American wrestler, trainer, and promoter
- Bertalan Széchényi (1866–1943), Hungarian politician
- Bertalan Székely (1835–1910), Hungarian painter
- Bertalan Szemere (1812–1869), Hungarian poet, nationalist, and Prime Minister of Hungary
- Bertalan Zakany (born 1984), Hungarian figure skater
- Bertalan Zsótér (1906–1980), Hungarian sports shooter
