= São Bartolomeu =

São Bartolomeu (Portuguese for Saint Bartholomew) may refer to the following places:

== in Portugal ==
- São Bartolomeu (Borba), a civil parish in the municipality of Borba
- São Bartolomeu (Coimbra), a civil parish in the municipality of Coimbra
- São Bartolomeu (Vila Viçosa), a civil parish in the municipality of Vila Viçosa
- São Bartolomeu de Regatos, a civil parish in the municipality of Angra do Heroísmo, Azores
- São Bartolomeu dos Galegos, a civil parish in the municipality of Lourinhã
- São Bartolomeu de Messines, a civil parish in the municipality of Silves

== in Brazil ==
- São Bartolomeu River, a river in Goiás state
