= Llovera =

Llovera is a Catalan surname. Notable people with this surname include:

- Albert Llovera (born 1966), Andorran rally driver and former alpine skier
- Antonio Cañizares Llovera (born 1945), Spanish cardinal of the Roman Catholic Church
- Cristina Llovera (born 1996), Andorran sprinter
- Mauricio Llovera (born 1996), Venezuelan baseball player
- Max Llovera (born 1997), Andorran footballer

== See also ==
- Lloveras
