= Bartolomeo =

Bartolomeo or Bartolommeo is a masculine Italian given name, the Italian equivalent of Bartholomew. Its diminutive form is Baccio. Notable people with the name include:

- Abramo Bartolommeo Massalongo (1824–1860), Italian paleobotanist and lichenologist
- Bartolomeo Aimo (1889–1970), Italian professional bicycle road racer
- Bartolomeo Altomonte, a.k.a. Bartholomäus Hohenberg (1694–1783), Austrian baroque painter
- Bartolomeo Amico a.k.a. Bartholomeus Amicus (1562–1649), Jesuit priest, teacher and writer who spent his adult life in Naples
- Bartolomeo Ammanati (1511–1592), Florentine architect and sculptor
- Bartolomeo Avanzini (1608–1658), Italian architect of the Baroque period
- Bartolomeo Bacilieri (1842–1923), Italian cardinal, Bishop of Verona 1900–1923
- Bartolommeo Bandinelli (1488–1560), Italian sculptor
- Bartolomeo Barbarino (c. 1568–c. 1617 or later), Italian composer and singer of the early Baroque era
- Bartolomeo Bassi (early 1600s-1640s), Genoese painter of the early Baroque period
- Bartolomeo Bellano a.k.a. Bartolomeo Vellano (c. 1437–c. 1496), Italian Renaissance sculptor and architect
- Bartolomeo Bimbi (1648–1723), Florentine painter of still lifes
- Bartolomeo Biscaino (1632–1657), Italian painter of the Baroque period, active in Genoa
- Bartolomeo Bon (d. after 1464), Italian sculptor and architect from Campione d’Italia
- Bartolomeo Borghesi (1781–1860), Italian antiquarian, key figure in establishing the science of numismatics
- Bartolomeo Campagnoli (1751–1827), Italian violinist and composer
- Bartolomeo Cappellari (1765–1846), Pope Gregory XVI (1831–46)
- Bartolomeo Carducci (1560–1608), Italian painter, better known as Carducho
- Bartolomeo Cavaceppi (1716–1799), Italian sculptor
- Bartolomeo Cavarozzi (c. 1590–1625), Italian painter of the Baroque period active in Spain
- Bartolomeo Cesi (1556–1629), Italian painter of the Baroque era of the Bolognese School
- Bartolomeo Colleoni (c. 1400–1475), Italian condottiero
- Bartolomeo Contarini (nobleman) (fl. mid-15th century), Venetian businessman, governor of the Duchy of Athens after marrying the widowed duchess
- Bartolomeo Contarini (naval commander), 17th-century commander of the Venetian and Papal fleets at the Battle of Andros in the Great Turkish War
- Bartolomeo Costantini (1889–1941), Italian aviator and racing car driver
- Bartolomeo Cristofori (1655–1731), Italian maker of musical instruments, generally regarded as the inventor of the piano
- Bartolomeo da Bologna (fl. 1405–1427), Italian composer of the early Quattrocento
- Bartolomeo d'Alviano (1455–1515), Italian condottiero and captain, fought in the defense of the Venetian Republic against the Holy Roman Emperor Maximilian
- Bartolomeo d'Aragona (fl. late 14th–early 15th centuries), Sicilian nobleman and statesman; defeated in a rebellion and exiled
- Bartolomeo degli Organi (1474–1539), Italian composer, singer, and organist of the Renaissance
- Bartolomeo del Tintore (1459–1495), Italian manuscript illuminator
- Bartolomeo della Gatta (1448–1502), Florentine painter, illuminator, and architect
- Bartolomeo della Rocca (1467–1504), Bolognese scholar of chiromancy, physiognomy, and astrology
- Bartolomeo di Breganze (c. 1200–c. 1271), Italian prelate, bishop of Vicenza and founder of the Order of the Blessed Virgin Mary
- Bartolomeo di Cassino (fl. late 16th century), Italian painter active in the Mannerist period
- Bartolomeo di Giovanni (died 1501), Florentine painter, worked under Sandro Botticelli
- Bartolomeo di Tommaso (fl. early 15th century), Italian painter
- Bartolomeo Eustachi a.k.a. Eustachius (c. 1500–1574), Italian anatomist, one of the founders of the science of human anatomy, eponym of the Eustachian tube
- Bartolomeo Facio (1400–1457), Italian historian, writer, and humanist
- Bartolomeo Gastaldi (1818–1879), Italian geologist and paleontologist, one of the founders of the Club Alpino Italiano
- Bartolomeo Ghetti (painter) (died 1536), Renaissance painter from Florence
- Bartolomeo Ghetti (sculptor) (died 1708), Baroque sculptor from Carrara
- Bartolomeo Giuseppe Guarneri a.k.a. Giuseppe Guarneri (1698–1744), Italian luthier from the Guarneri house of Cremona
- Bartolomeo Goggio (c. 1430–1490s), Italian writer and notary
- Bartolomeo Gosio (1863–1944), Italian physician
- Bartolomeo Gradenigo (c. 1260–1342), 53rd doge of Venice 1339–1342
- Bartolomeo Guidobono a.k.a. il Prete di Savona or Prete Bartolomeo da Savona (1654–1709), Italian painter of the Baroque period
- Bartolomeo I della Scala (died 1304), lord of Verona 1301–04
- Bartolomeo II della Scala (d. July 12, 1381), lord of Verona 1375–1381
- Bartolomeo Letterini (1669–after 1731), Venetian painter of the Baroque period
- Bartolomeo Manfredi (1582–1622), Italian painter, a leading member of the Caravaggisti
- Bartolomeo Maranta a.k.a. Bartholomaeus Marantha (c. 1500–1571), Venetian physician, botanist, and literary theorist
- Bartolomeo Marchionni (fl. late 15th–early 16th centuries), Florentine merchant established in Lisbon during the Age of Discovery
- Bartolomeo Mastri a.k.a. Bartholomew Mastrius (1602–1673), Italian Conventual Franciscan philosopher and theologian
- Bartolomeo Minio (fl. late 15th century), Venetian sea captain and commander (provveditor e capitanio) of Nauplion in the Venetian Morea
- Bartolomeo Montagna (c. 1450–1523), Italian painter and architect who worked in Vicenza and Venice
- Bartolomeo Montalbano (c. 1598–before 1651), Venetian Baroque composer
- Bartolomeo Nazari (1693–1758), Italian painter of the late-Baroque period
- Bartolomeo Pacca (1756–1844), Italian Cardinal, scholar, and Vatican statesman
- Bartolomeo Pagano (1878–1947), Italian motion picture actor
- Bartolomeo Panizza (1785–1867), Italian anatomist and surgeon
- Bartolomeo Passarotti (1529–1592), Italian painter of the mannerist period
- Bartolomeo Pinelli (1771–1835), Italian illustrator and engraver
- Bartolomeo Platina (1421–1481), Italian teacher, scholar, author, and member of the College of Abbreviators
- Bartolomeo Prignano (1318–1389), Pope Urban VI 1378–1389
- Bartolomeo Ruspoli (1697–1741), Italian cardinal, Knight of Malta
- Bartolomeo Sanvito (1435–1518), scribe from Padua, trained in Rome; master of Humanist italic script
- Bartolomeo Scala (1430–1497), Italian politician, author, and historian
- Bartolomeo Scappi (c. 1500–1577), Renaissance chef, served Popes Pius IV and Pius V from the Vatican kitchen
- Bartolomeo Schedoni (1578–1615), Italian early Baroque painter of Reggio Emilia
- Bartolomeo Sinibaldi a.k.a. Baccio da Montelupo (1469–c. 1523), sculptor of the Italian Renaissance period
- Bartolomeo Suardi a.k.a. Bramantino (c. 1456 – c. 1530), Italian painter and architect in Milano
- Bartolomeo Trinci (died 1421), Italian nobleman, lord of Foligno 1415–21
- Bartolomeo Tromboncino (1470–1535 or later), Italian composer of the middle Renaissance period; infamous for murdering his wife
- Bartolomeo Trosylho (1500–1567), Portuguese composer of the Renaissance period
- Bartolomeo Vanzetti (of Sacco and Vanzetti) (1888–1927), Italian immigrant convicted and executed for murder in Massachusetts, USA
- Bartolomeo Veneto (1502–1546), Italian painter who worked in Venice
- Bartolomeo Vivarini (c. 1432 – c. 1499), Italian painter
- Bartolomeo Zaccaria (died 1334), Italian nobleman, Margrave of Bodonitsa, Lord of Damala
- Fra Bartolomeo (1472–1517), also known as Bartolommeo di S. Marco, Bartolommeo di Pagholo, and Bacchio della Porta, an Italian Renaissance painter
- Santo Bartolomeo Quadri (1919–2008), Italian prelate of Roman Catholic Church

== See also ==
- Bartholomew and its diminutive Bart
- Bartol (given name)
- Bartolomé (disambiguation)
