= Bartholomew of Parma =

First recorded astronomy lecturer at the University of Bologna

Bartholomew of Parma (Latin: Bartolomeus de Parma) was the first recorded lecturer on astronomy at the University of Bologna, active in the 1280s and 1290s. He was the author of Tractatus sphaerae (Treatise of the Spheres) and acquired a reputation as an astrologer and geomancer.

In the Tractatus sphaerae, he described geomancy, one of his main interests, as the practical side or ‘little daughter’ of the art of astrology, and also as 'another astrology' (alta astrologia). In geomancy, every point is deposited according to a star of the heavens, and every figure is deposited according to a certain element in the order of the four elements. Similarly, every figure is deposited according to the sign of the star among the twelve signs of the heavens, a planet and a cardinal direction. (altra astrologia).

Through astrology, considered an 'art' in thirteenth century Italy, feudal princes wanted to know their civic "fortune". Works by astrologers such as those of Bartholomew of Parma's were considered invaluable as they described how the information gained from celestial movement could be interpreted to guide civic leaders and maintain governance over their city states.
