= Joseph Bartholomew =

Joseph Bartholomew may refer to:

- Joseph Bartholomew (judge) (1843–1901), American judge in North Dakota
- Joseph Bartholomew (major general) (1766–1840), general in the Indiana Militia
- Joseph Bartholomew (golf course designer) (1885–1971), African American architect, golfer, and golf course designer
