= Bartholomeus de Jager =

Dutch corsair active in the Caribbean in the 1650s

- Disappeared: 1656
- Years active: 1655

Bartholomeus de Jager was a Dutch corsair active in the Caribbean in the 1650s.

== Campaign against the Portuguese (1655) ==
In 1655, de Jager boarded and looted the Portuguese ship the Consciencia, taking its cargo of sugar. In October, de Jager met Dutch privateer Cornelis Janszoon van de Velde in Antillen, with whom he went on to attack two other Portuguese ships near Fernando de Noronha. One of the ships was captured and loaded with part of the stolen sugar from the Consciencia and the other managed to flee. The rest of the sugar was put on board the ship The Salamander of the Lampsin brothers.

After the short campaign, de Jager sailed for Holland to sell his loot.
