= Bartholomäus Hopfer =

German painter

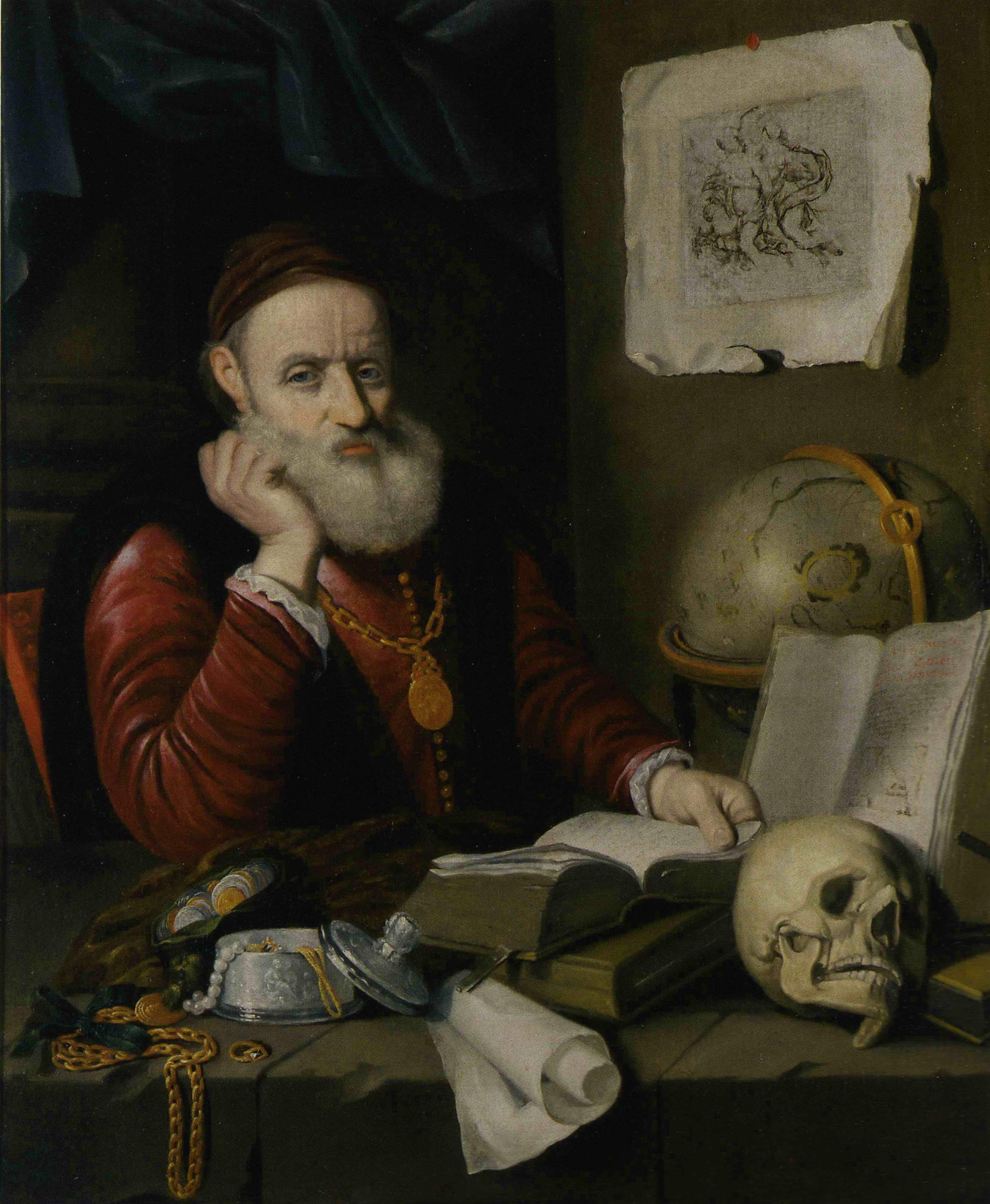
Exilium Melancholiae

Bartholomäus Hopfer (1628–1699) was a German painter.

He was born in Amsterdam where he is known in period accounts as Hopffer. He is sometimes referred to as "the Younger" to differentiate him from the Renaissance painter by the same name who was the father of Daniel Hopfer. It is unclear if he was a distant relation, but several generations of the Hopfer family were active as engravers in Augsburg, and this younger Hopfer was also active there and in Wickersheim before moving to Strasbourg, where he died.
