= Lindsay Bartholomew =

British artist

- Born: 1944 (age 81–82); Wirral, Cheshire, England
- Education: Ruskin School of Drawing, Oxford
- Known for: Watercolour paintings of British landscapes
- Notable work: Rural countryside scenes
- Movement: Contemporary British landscape art
- Awards: Ruskin Prize for Portraiture (1964)

Lindsay Bartholomew (born 1944) is a British artist who is notable for her watercolour paintings of British landscapes.

== Biography ==
Bartholomew was born on the Wirral in Cheshire and between 1961 and 1964 studied at the Ruskin School of Drawing in Oxford. In her final year at the Ruskin she won the Ruskin Prize for Portraiture. After graduating, Bartholomew taught in London for twelve years and in 1977 had her first solo exhibition at the MacRobert Gallery at the University of Stirling. In 1985 Bartholomew moved to Somerset and continued to paint the rural countryside. Bartholomew has participated in a large number of group shows at commercial galleries, including the Grafton Gallery, the Maas Gallery and Roland, Browse & Delbanco, and also exhibited with the Royal West of England Academy.
