= Bartholomäus van der Lake =

German clergyman and chronicler

Bartholomäus van der Lake (died 1468) was a German clergyman and author of a chronicle of the city of Soest.
