= Anatole Jean-Baptiste Antoine de Barthélemy =

French archaeologist and numismatist (1821–1904)

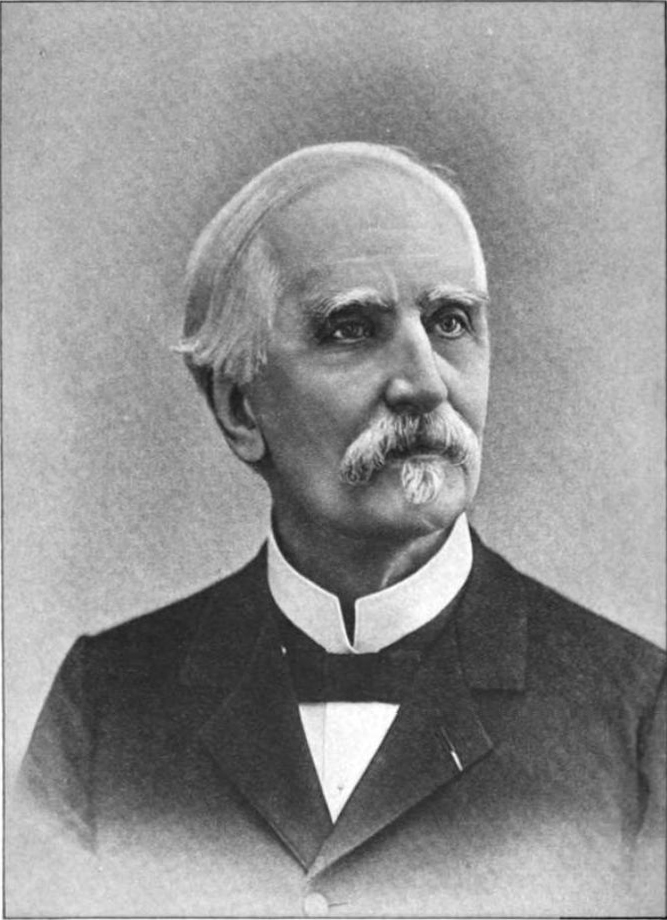
Anatole Jean-Baptiste Antoine de Barthélemy

Anatole Jean-Baptiste Antoine de Barthélemy (1 July 1821 – 27 June 1904) was a French archaeologist and numismatist.

== Life ==
He was born at Reims in 1821, and died at Ville d'Avray in 1904.

In collaboration with J. Geslin de Bourgogne he published Études sur la Révolution en Bretagne in 1858, and between 1855 and 1879 an exhaustive work in six volumes on the Anciens évêchés de Bretagne; histoire et monuments. In 1880 appeared the Choix de documents inédits sur l'histoire de la ligue en Bretagne, by himself alone. But it was, above all, his numismatical work which established his reputation. This included several popular publications, such as the Nouveau manuel complet de numismatique ancienne (1851; second edition, revised, 1890), and the Nouveau Manuel complet de la numismatique du moyen âge et moderne (1853; new edition revised by Adrien Planchet), and a large number of monographs and articles in the technical reviews.

The following may be specially mentioned: Numismatique mérovingienne (1865); Essai sur la monnaie parisis (1874); Note sur l'origine de la monnaie tournoise (1896); and in the series of instructions issued by the Comité des travaux historiques et scientifiques he edited the number on La Numismatique de la France (1891). In 1897 he was elected a member of the Académie des Inscriptions et Belles-Lettres.

His younger brother, Édouard Marie, comte de Barthélemy, who was born in Angers in 1830, published a number of documents on the ancient French nobility and the history of Champagne.

== See also ==
- Joseph Pellerin
