= Bartholomew Newsam =

Bartholomew Newsam (died 1593) was an English clockmaker who worked for Queen Elizabeth I.

== Biography ==
Probably born at York, Newsam carried on business in London as a clockmaker, apparently from the date of Queen Elizabeth's accession in 1558. He obtained from the crown a thirty years' lease of premises in the Strand, near Somerset House, on 8 April 1565, and there he resided through life.

Newsam was skilled in his craft, and was on familiar terms with Sir Philip Sidney and other men of influence at court. About 1572 the post of Clock-master to the Queen was promised him on the death of Nicholas Urseau (Ursiu, Veseau, or Orshowe). The latter had held the office under Queen Mary, and was reappointed to it by Queen Elizabeth. Newsam succeeded to the office before 1582. On 4 June 1583 he received, under the privy seal dated 27 May previous, "32s. 8d. for mending of clockes" during the past year. With the post of clockmaker he combined that of clock-keeper; the two offices had been held by different persons in Queen Mary's reign, and Newsam appears to have been the first Englishman appointed as clock-keeper.

On 5 August 1583l Newsam wrote "to the ryghte honorable his very speciall good ffriend Sr ffrancis Walsingham, knighte", beseeching him "to be mindfull unto her Ma[jes]tie of my booke concerninge my long and chargeable suite, wherein I have procured Sir Philipp Sidney to move you for th' augmentinge of the yeares (if by any meanes the same may be)"; i.e. probably for an extension of his lease of the house in the Strand. On 6 September 1583, by letters patent, a lease for twenty-one years was granted to Newsam of lands "at Fleete in Lincolnshire, formerly the property of Henry, marquis of Dorset, late duke of Suffolk; also a water-mill at Wymondham, Norfolk, with fishings, &c., formerly property of the monastery of Wymondham … also all the weare of Llanlluney, co. Pembroke, and two garden plots lying in Firkett's Fields, in the parish of St. Clement Danes without Temple Bar", etc. The property in Pembroke had formerly belonged to Jasper, Duke of Bedford. Newsam also owned lands in Coney Street, in the parish of St. Martin, York. He died before 18 December 1593, when his will was proved by Parnell, his widow.

There is in the British Museum a striking clock made by Newsam, which is still in almost untouched condition. It is of gilded brass, richly engraved. It is very small, not more than four inches high, and contains a compass; it has, of course, no pendulum, and but one hand. It is signed "Bartilmewe Newsum". The case is divided into two stories, the going train being in the upper, and the striking train in the lower storey. Both the trains are arranged vertically, so that the clock is wound from underneath. The wheels are of iron, or perhaps steel, the plates and frames being of brass. It has fusees cut for catgut, which are long, and only slightly tapered. The hand is driven directly from the going fusee at right angles, by means of a contrate-wheel. The escapement is of the verge kind, and it has no balance-spring.

The bequests in Newsam's will confirm the evidence of his skill afforded by this clock. Mention is made there of:

- "a strickinge clocke in a silken purse, and a sonnedyall to stand upon a post in his garden"
- "a cristall Jewell with a watch in it garnished with goulde"
- "a sonnedyall of copper gylte;" of "a watch gylte to shew the hower"
- "a great dyall in a greate boxe of ivory, with two and thirteth poyntes of the compos"
- "chamber clocke of five markes price"

== Family ==
Newsam married Parnell Younge, in the church of St. Mary-le-Strand on 10 September 1565. He left four children: William (born 27 December 1570), Edward, Margaret, and Rose. He died in 1593.

Edward, "on condicion that he become a clockmaker as I am", was to have his father's tools, except his "best Vice save one, a beckhorne to stand upon borde, a greate fore-hammer, and [two] hand hammers, and a grete long beckhorne in my back shoppe"; all these were to go to John Newsam of York, a clockmaker, and presumably a relative.
