= Bartholomaeus Stockmann =

Danish composer

Bartholomaeus Stockmann (Braunschweig, c. 1550 - possibly 1609) was a Danish composer who was a subject of Denmark–Norway. His 1590 publication Musica Nuptialis is the oldest collection of motets from Denmark.

He entered the cantorium of Frederick II of Denmark in Copenhagen in September 1587 as a bass singer, and thereafter became cantor in Flensburg.
