= Barthélemy (explorer) =

Canadian explorer

Barthélemy, (fl. 1687), a young man from France, was part of René-Robert Cavelier, Sieur de La Salle's final expedition in 1687.

Barthélemy's rather dubious claim to a place in written history occurred after the murder of La Salle on the Trinity River in present-day Texas, United States. La Salle's companion, Joutel, led a group who were returning to New France, Barthélemy being among them. He ended up at Henri Tonty's post at the mouth of the Arkansas River, later known as Arkansas Post. There he made any number of defamatory statements about La Salle which were recorded by the post commander, Jean Couture. At least one historian and author, Francis Parkman, dismissed these statements as a "ridiculous defamation".
