= Kate Bartholomew =

American hat designer (1868–1951)

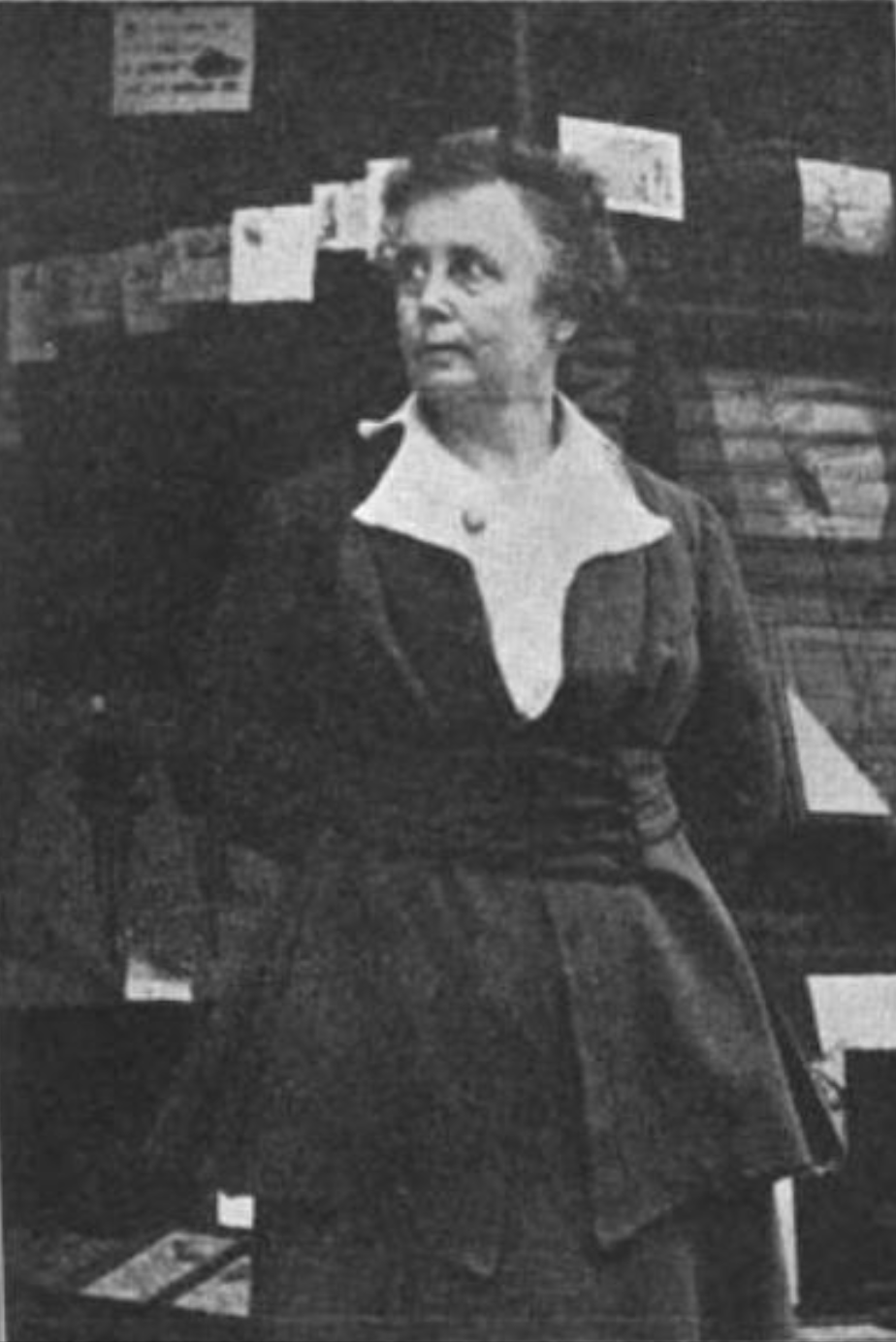
- Bartholomew in 1921
- Born: Kate Schuck; 1868; San Jose, California, U.S.
- Died: January 24, 1951 (aged 82–83); San Francisco, California, U.S.
- Other names: Katy
- Occupations: art teacher; hat designer; penant and hat manufacturer
- Known for: Created the "Jazz Cap"
- Spouse: John William Bartholomew (div.)
- Children: 1

Kate Bartholomew (1868-1951) was an American hat designer and manufacturer who created the "Jazz Cap". Earlier in her career, she worked as an art teacher and director in the Portland, Oregon schools. Bartholomew also operated a shop in Portland, which manufactured pennants and banners.

== Early life ==
Kate (nickname, "Katy") Schuck was born in San Jose, California in 1868.

Her father, George M. Schuck, was a music teacher and church organist of Portland, Oregon. He was born in Germany, and at the age of 21, came to the U.S. He lived for many years in California, being Professor Vocal and Instrumental Music at the University of the Pacific . He brought his family to Oregon In 1883.

== Career ==
Bartholomew was an art teacher in the Portland, Oregon schools for many years, and served as art director in the city's public schools.

She married John William Bartholomew who owned the American Box Manufacturing Company of San Francisco, California. They divorced in 1912.

She moved back to Portland in 1918. On her own, with a boy six years old and his grandfather to support, she had just US$100 to her name. They had lost everything else in the San Francisco fire of 1906. There was one thing she could do a little better than anyone else, and that was to dress dolls. She had six of them left over from a bazaar. On a chance, she took them to the biggest department store in Portland. She had taught the owner of that store in school when he was a youngster. She sold her dolls and got orders for more.

Then the pennant craze broke out among the youth of the nation. Bartholomew made the first pennant in Portland and became the authority in that city on school colors. She operated the Bartholomew Pennant Shop, a factory for the manufacture of pennants and banners.

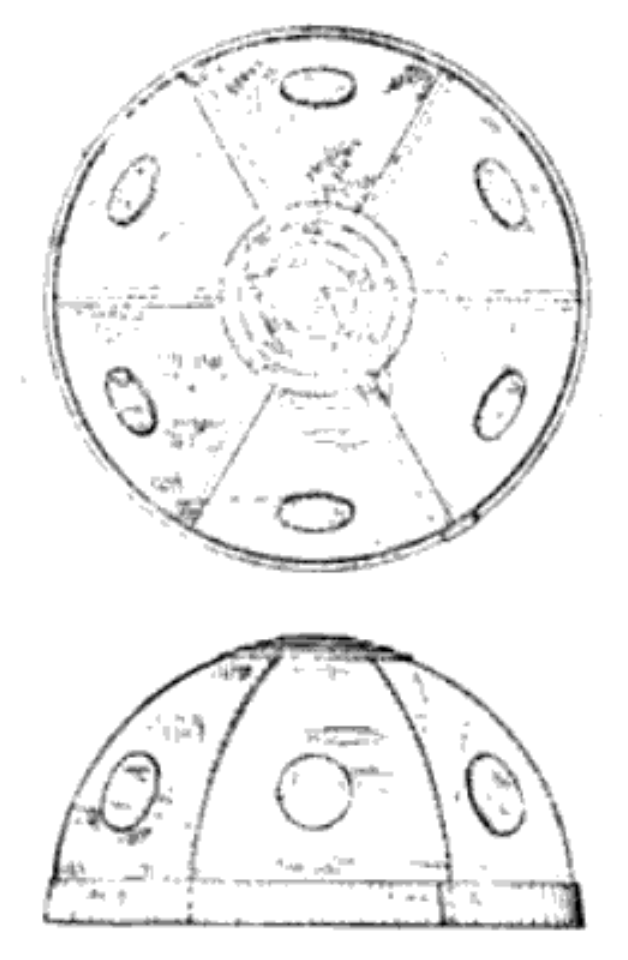
Jazz cap 1919

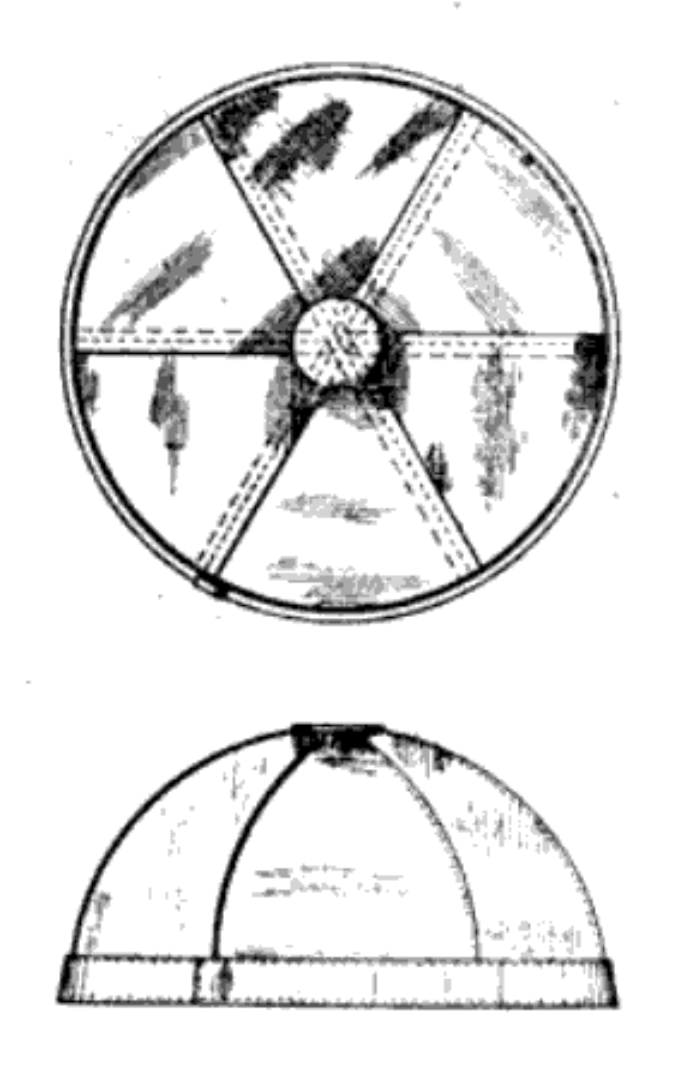
Jazz cap 1920

One day, sitting at the sewing machine in her small novelty shop on one of the side streets of Portland, her usually pleasant nature became revolted at the sight of the endless yards of drab-colored felt on which she was working. She rose to her feet stating, "I'm sick of this stuff!", and threw it to the floor. "Now I'm going to make the most frivolous, riotous, foolish thing I can think of." She picked up scraps of the brightest colors in the spectrum. From remnant box, waste basket and litter of the shop, she gathered odds and ends, cut them in long triangular pieces, sewed them, topped the whole with a flashy, button-like piece and created a small skull-cap of brilliant hues. It looked like a rainbow. Tossing it into the display window, Bartholomew didn't care what it was called, or what it looked like; she just knew that she felt better. She had to have some outlet and that cap was it.

A few minutes later, a young newsboy saw the cap in the window and ventured inside and bought the cap. From that cap sprang a business of at least 100,000 caps a year, for it wasn't long after the first newsboy appeared before the rest of the "gang" had to have one, too. The caps couldn't be made fast enough in those first days. Sometimes a line of young customers stood at Bartholomew's elbow waiting their turn to be fitted. To the one helpful worker who first named the cap, other workers were added, including other elderly women who had insufficient incomes.

With seven pieces in the crown and every piece a different color, it was an art to blend them so that no inharmonious combinations occurred. It was the art knowledge in Bartholomew that produced pleasant results. The caps varied in color combinations, to please individual tastes. They became known as "Jazz caps”. In September 1919, she filed for a patent on the cap, and in April 1920, she filed for a patent on a secondary version of it.

== Personal life ==
The money Bartholomew made helped to put her only son, Frank H. Bartholomew, through school. He served as president of United Press International (1955-1962) and chairman of the board of directors (1962-1972).

After retiring in 1931, Bartholomew returned to San Francisco where she died on January 24, 1951.
