= Baccio Lake =

Lake in Italy

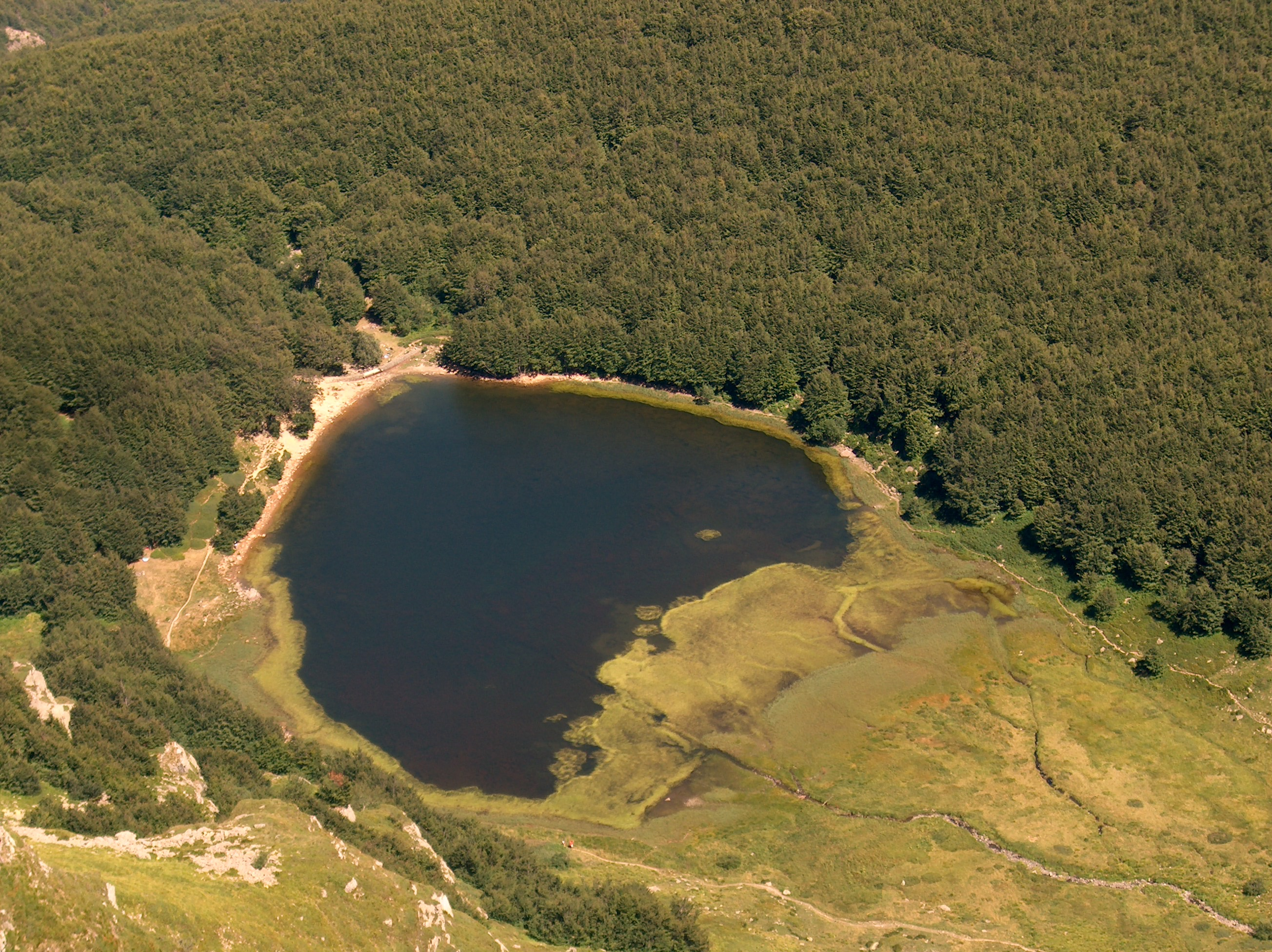

- Location within Italy
- Location: Province of Modena, Emilia-Romagna
- Coordinates: 44.129770°N 10.589061°E
- Primary outflows: Fosso Baccio
- Basin countries: Italy
- Max. depth: 9 m (30 ft) (over 11 m or 36 ft during winter)
- Surface elevation: 1,550 m (5,090 ft)

Baccio Lake is a natural lake in the Province of Modena, Emilia-Romagna, Italy.

== Overview ==
It is amongst the largest lakes in the Apennine Mountains of Modena, second only to Lago Santo.

It is located over 1500 meters above sea level with a maximum summer depth of around 9 meters, it can rise up to and over 2 meters during winter.

The origin of the lake is unknown, because there are no volcanoes located in the area, and has low seismicity.

It contains flora such as Eriophorum scheuchzeri.
