= Bartholomaeus of Bruges =

Flemish physician and natural philosopher

Bartholomaeus of Bruges (Barthélemy de Bruges) (died 1356) was a Flemish physician and natural philosopher.

== Life ==
He graduated M.A. at the University of Paris in 1307, and became a master of medicine. He came under the influence of Radulphus Brito.

Bartholomaeus served as physician to Guy I, Count of Blois, until the count died. He was a reforming medical teacher, replacing the older curriculum based on the Articella by a new Galenism.

== Works ==
Bartholomaeus wrote commentaries on Aristotle. His work on the Poetics is noted for its sympathy with mimesis as a poetical function, and so an opening towards classical drama (the original work of Aristotle not being available at the time in Western Europe, the basis was a Latin translation by Hermannus Alemannus from Averroes, the Commentaria Media). He engaged in controversy with John of Jandun on the sensus agens, an active perceptive faculty of the soul. The reply of John of Jandun has been dated to 1310.

At the University of Montpellier he wrote also on the Ars Medicine. Some of the medical works that were attributed to him are considered to be by Bartholomew of Salerno instead. In 1348, at the time of the Black Death, he wrote on the plague.
