= Édouard de Barthélemy =

French historian (1830–1888)

Édouard Marie, comte de Barthélemy (21 November 1830, Angers – 30 May 1888, Paris) was a French administrator and historian. He was the brother of archaeologist Anatole Jean-Baptiste Antoine de Barthélemy.

During his career he served as an auditor of the Conseil du sceau des titres (Council Seal of securities), a member of the General Council of the Marne, mayor of Courmelois and as a correspondent member of the Académie nationale de Reims.

== Selected works ==
- Histoire de la ville de Châlons-sur-Marne et de ses institutions : depuis son origine jusqu'en 1780, (1854) – History of the town of Châlons-sur-Marne and its institutions, from its beginning until 1780.
- Les princes de la maison royale de Savoie, 1860 – The princes of the House of Savoy.
- Œuvres de Mathurin Régnier, 1862 – Works of Mathurin Régnier.
- Les Ducs et les duchés français avant et depuis 1789, (1867) – The dukes and French duchies before and since 1789.
- Mesdames de France, filles de Louis XV, 1870 – Ladies of France, Louis XV's daughters.
- La princesse de Condé Charlotte-Catherine de la Trémoille, d'aprés des lettres inédites conservées dans les archives de Thouars, 1872 – The Princess of Condé, Charlotte Catherine de La Trémoille, according to unpublished letters preserved in the archives of Thouars.
- Mémoires de Charlotte-Amélie de La Trémoille, Comtesse d'Altenbourg (1652-1719), (1876) – Memoirs of Charlotte-Amélie de La Trémoille, Countess of Altenburg (1652-1719).
- La dauphine Marie-Antoinette en Champagne, 1770, (1882) – The Dauphine Marie Antoinette in Champagne, 1770.
- Recueil des chartes de l'abbaye royale de Montmartre, 1883 – Series of charters of the Royal Abbey of Montmartre.
- Histoire des relations de la France et du Danemarck sous le ministère du comte de Bernstorff, 1751-1770, (1887) – History of relations between France and Denmark under the ministry of Count Bernstorff, 1751-1770.
