= Agnes Bartholomew =

Scottish actress

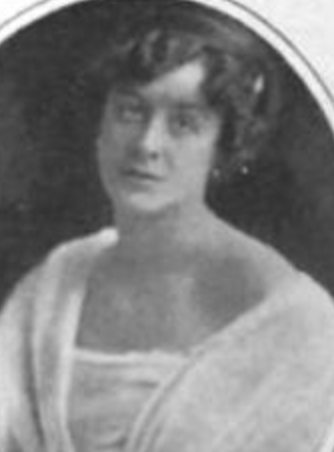
- Agnes Bartholomew, from a 1913 publication
- Born: 1885; Glasgow
- Died: 10 September 1955 (aged 69–70); Glasgow
- Occupations: Actress, singer, elocutionist
- Spouse(s): Harry Lumsden; Holmes Herbert

Agnes Bartholomew (1885 – 10 September 1955) was a Scottish stage actress, singer, and "one of the leading elocutionists in Britain."

== Early life and education ==
Bartholomew was born in Glasgow, the daughter of parents from Stirlingshire. She studied acting with Genevieve Ward, at Tree's Academy of Dramatic Art in London. "My family didn't want me to go on the stage, but they have changed their minds since," she told a Canadian newspaper in 1912.

== Career ==
Bartholomew acted on the stage in Merely Mary Ann, Diana of Dobson’s, Mrs Gorringe’s Necklace, The Little Minister, The Professor's Love Story, The £12 Look, Christina (1911), Auntie Mirren (1914), The Old Lady Shows her Medals (1919, 1928), Macpherson, and Wee Macgreegor. She was a member of the Glasgow Repertory Theatre. She often played older women, even in her twenties. She appeared on Broadway in the comedy A Scrape o' the Pen (1912). She worked on one film, A Man Called Peter (1955), but her scenes were cut before the film was released.

Bartholomew made recordings reciting the works of Robert Burns and other Scots poets, and recited at Burns dinner events. As her first husband was secretary to the Trades House of Glasgow, she was active in charity work for that body. She sang at a 1919 benefit for blinded soldiers and sailors, in Kilmarnock.

Bartholomew performed in Canada and the United States in 1922. In 1934, while touring in Canada again, she gave a recital for the Scottish Charities of Vancouver.

== Personal life ==
Bartholomew married Harry Lumsden in 1914; he died in 1939. Her second husband was English actor Holmes Herbert; they married in 1952. She died in 1955, in Glasgow, after several months' illness. Her gravesite is with her second husband's, in Forest Lawn Memorial Park in Glendale, California.
