= Guglielmo Bacci =

Italian footballer and coach

Personal information
- Date of birth: 15 April 1955 (age 71)
- Place of birth: Turin, Italy
- Height: 1.81 m (5 ft 11 1/2 in)
- Positions: Defender; midfielder

Team information
- Current team: Torres

Senior career*
Years	Team	Apps	(Gls)
1975–1978	Roma	15	(1)
1978	L.R. Vicenza	0	(0)
1978–1980	Sambenedettese	58	(5)
1980–1981	Udinese	18	(0)
1981–1982	Perugia	15	(1)
1982–1983	Taranto	24	(0)
1983–1984	Reggiana	8	(0)
1984–1985	Nocerina	23	(0)
1985–1986	Ternana	7	(0)
Total		168	(7)

Managerial career
- 2011: Torres
- 2012–: Torres
- * Club domestic league appearances and goals

Guglielmo Bacci (born 15 April 1955 in Turin) is an Italian football coach of Torres and a former player.

== Career ==
=== Player ===
He has played for 4 seasons (34 games, 1 goal) in the Serie A for A.S. Roma and Udinese Calcio.

=== Coach ===
In March 2011 he becomes the new coach, until the end of the season, of Torres in the Eccellenza Sardinia in place of the sacked Roberto Ennas.

Since June 2012 he was again the coach of Torres in Serie D.
