= Bartholomew of Edessa =

Syrian Christian writer

Bartholomew of Edessa was a Syrian Christian apologist, and polemical writer. The place of his birth is not known; it was probably Edessa or some neighbouring town, for he was certainly a monk of that city, and in his refutation of Agarenus, he calls himself several times "the monk of Edessa". He is now dated to the thirteenth century.

== Works ==
There is a work of his written in Greek, which he directed against one Agarenus, a Muslim. The beginning of the refutation is lost; the title as given by Étienne Le Moine is Elenchus et Confutatio Agareni. This work may be read in the Migne collection This treatise, as it now stands, opens with a statement of the objections of Muslims against Christianity, among which are the dogmas of the Trinity, of the Incarnation, and of confession. Bartholomew then gives his answers, and makes many counter-charges against Mohammed and his revelation.

Bartholomew argues that nothing in Mohammed's parentage, education, or life betrays any God-given mission, and concludes that Mohammed was an impostor.

Bartholomew is well acquainted not only with the Christian position he defends, but also with the positions of his adversaries; he knows the customs, practices, and beliefs of the Arabs, and he boasts that he has read all their books.

A second treatise, Contra Muhammedum, is also printed in Migne under the name of Bartholomew of Edessa; but, in spite of the numerous resemblances, explainable otherwise than by identity of authorship, the differences are of such a nature as to make the ascription of it to Bartholomew unjustified. Such are e.g. the names and the number of Mohammed's wives and children; the editor of the Koran; the Nestorian monk who taught Mohammed Christianity, etc.
