= Bartholomew Basanta Miranda =

Spanish politician (1812–1885)

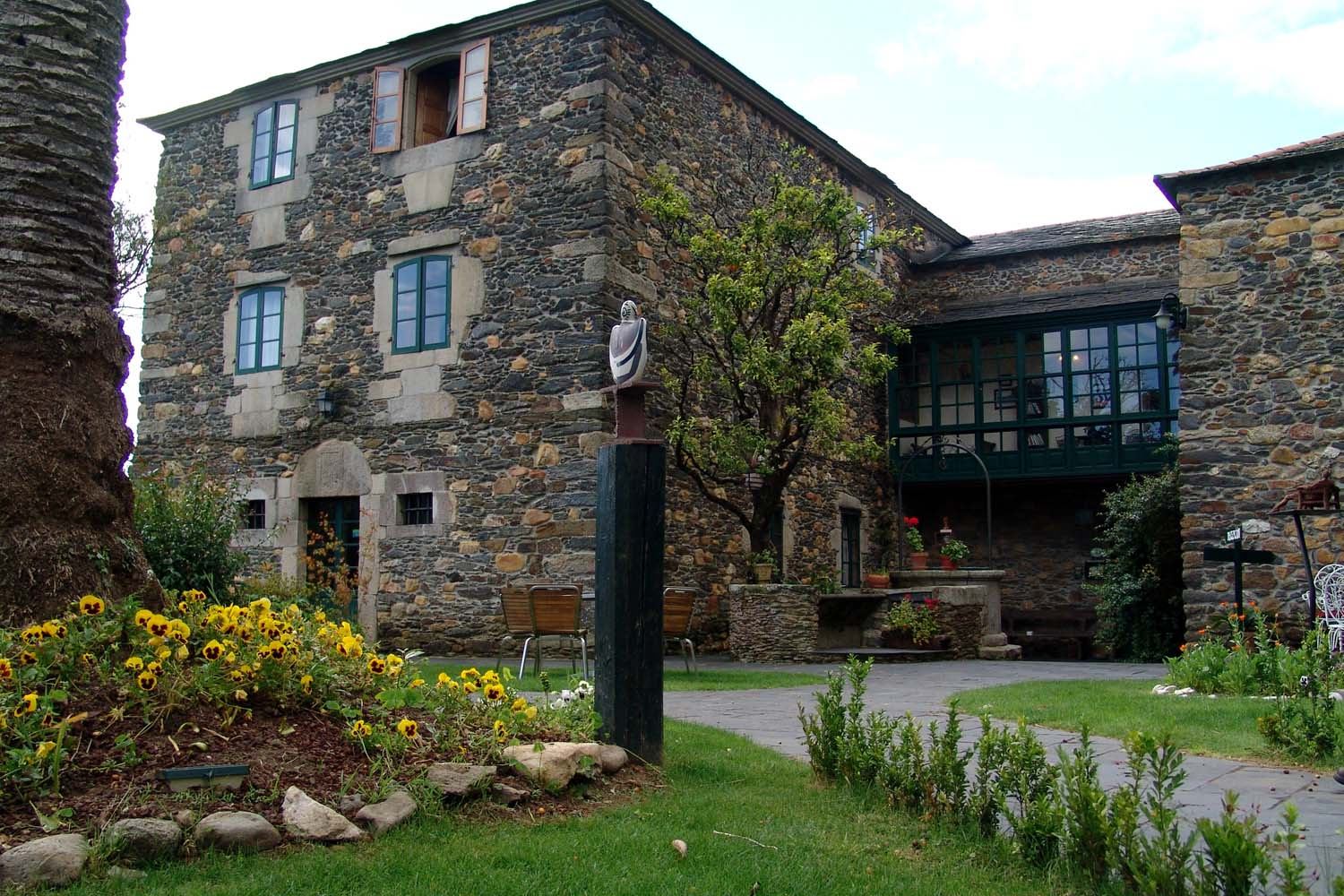
Home of Bartholomew Basanta in Viveiro

Bartholomew Basanta Miranda, born in Barreiros in 1812 and died on April 13, 1885, was a Galician politician.

== Career ==
Basanta was elected to represent the Province of Lugo in the Senate of Spain in 1872. During the Bourbon Restoration, he was the leader of the Conservative Party in Viveiro. He was elected to the Congress of Deputies of Spain by the Viveiro district in 1876, and was reelected in 1879. He was also mayor of Viveiro.
