= Bartholomew Thomas Duhigg =

Irish legal antiquary

Bartholomew Thomas Duhigg (1750?–1813) was an Irish legal antiquary.

Duhigg was called to the Irish bar in 1775. He was for a long period librarian to King's Inns, Dublin, and also held the post of assistant barrister for the county of Wexford. He also wrote, but never published, A Completion of King's Inns Remembrancer, giving an Account of the most Eminent Irish Lawyers, and a History of the Union with Ireland (History of the King's Inns, page 614). In a letter from Dr. Anderson to Bishop Percy, dated 3 September 1805, Duhigg is noted as "a writer of curious research and information", but as writing "a bad English style".

In addition to his legal investigations, Duhigg appears to have studied with much care the old Irish language. He was married, and had one son, an officer in the army.

== Publications ==
Duhigg wrote:

1. Observations on the Operation of Insolvent Laws and Imprisonment for Debt, republished Dublin, 1797.
2. Letter to the Right Honourable Charles Abbot on the Arrangement of Irish Records, &c., Dublin, 1801.
3. King's Inns Remembrancer, an Account of Irish Judges on the Revival of the King's Inns Society in 1607, Dublin, 1805.
4. History of the King's Inns, or an Account of the Legal Body in Ireland from its connection with England, Dublin, 1806.
