= Bartholomäus Khöll =

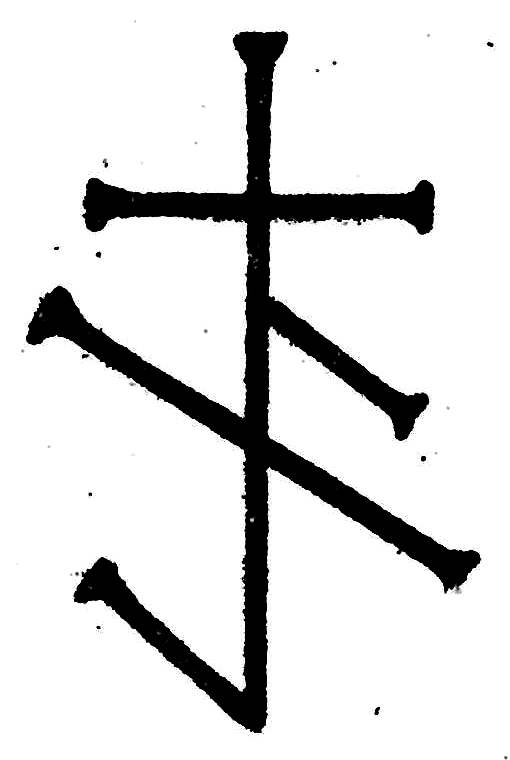
Bartholomäus Khöll’s Mason's mark

Bartholomäus Khöll (1614 – 20 February 1664 in Vienna) was an imperial master stonemason and 1653 superintendent of the Vienna Bauhütte (mason's guild).

== Life ==
Bartholomäus married into a family of stonemasons. His wife was Christine Ungerin, who was the daughter of Simon Unger, who oversaw the maintenance of St. Stephen's Cathedral. Bartholomäus became a master stonemason on 26 September 1650, even though his lack of masterworks led to him paying a fine in Reichsthaler.

He received citizenship from Vienna in July 1651, but there is not any information about his origins. His tax payments between 1652 and 1664 register him as a renter in central Vienna and as a middle income master craftsman.

On 22 December 1652 he was elected master of his Zunft's Rathaus.

His wife Christine died on 21 July 1661 at the age of 29. In her will and testament, she bequeathed her three children, David, Maria, and the one-year-old Micheal 150 Guilder. One of her testament witnesses was Adam Haresleben, who was the stonemason responsible for Vienna's cathedrals at the time.

Master Bartholomäus Khöll had remarried and wrote his will and testament on 19 February 1664. He died a few days later at the age of 50. His widow married the master stonemason Urab Illmayr, who took over Khöll's position as leader of the Vienna Bauhütte. The three children from his first marriage had become orphans, but they subsisted from the inheritance given by their parents.

== Main Entrance of the Schottenkirche ==
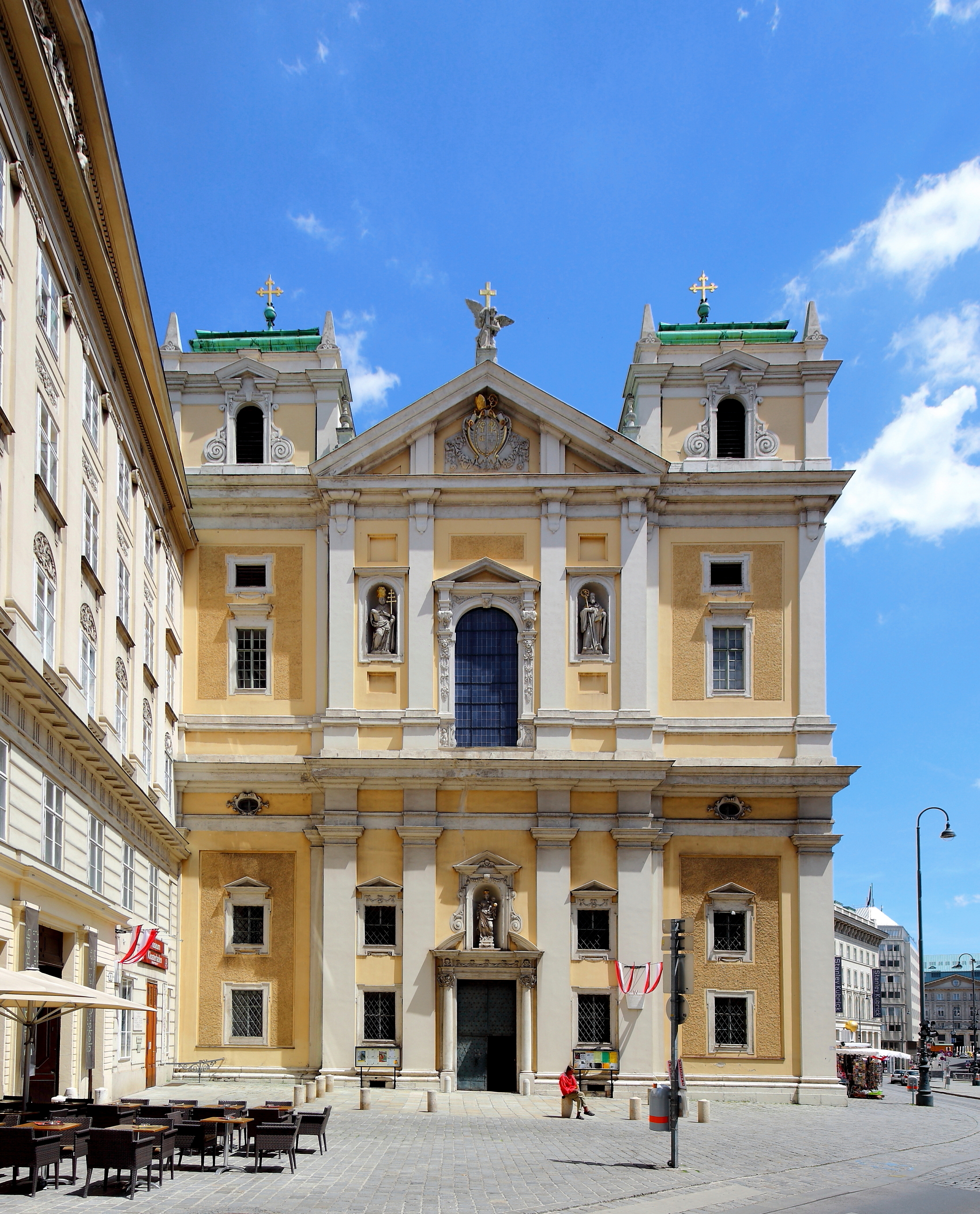
The Schottenkirche's tower facade

Bartholomäus Khöll built the middle tower facades of the Schottenkirche in 1652. He followed a plan with a half-column framing, Entablature, and blasted gable segments, to create a Niche. A sculptor of Maria with her child was created by Tobias Kracker and added to this niche in 1651.

== Work for the Imperial Court ==
There are excerpts from the receipts of respectives tasks assigned to Khöll from the imperial construction offices (Hofbaumates) for 1657. The following workers were named on these excerpts:

- Master Bartholomäus Khöll, Stone Mason: 710 Guilders
- Master Hans Engelbrecht, Court Cabinetmaker: 4.888 Guilders 30 Kreuzer
- Caspar Della, Court Painter: 188 Guilders.

== Literature ==
- Wiener Stadt- und Landesarchiv: Steuerakten, Steinmetzakten, Ereignisprotokolle.
- Otto E. Plettenbacher: Geschichte der Steinmetze von Wien im 17. Jahrhundert. Eine wirtschafts- und kulturhistorische, als auch soziologische Untersuchung. Dissertation, Universität Wien 1960.
- Herbert Haupt, Archivalien zur Kulturgeschichte des Wiener Hofes, II. Teil: Kaiser Leopold I. – Die Jahre 1657-1660.
- Dehio Wien: 1. Bezirk, Schottenstift und Kirche. 2003.
- Herbert Haupt: Das Hof- und hofbefreite Handwerk im barocken Wien 1620 bis 1770, Bartholomäus Köll. Forschungen und Beiträge zur Wiener Stadtgeschichte. Nr. 46. Studien-Verlag, Innsbruck, Wien, Bozen 2007, ISBN 978-3-7065-4342-2.
