= Barthélémy Thomas Strafforello =

French politician

- Born: 12 April 1764; Marseille, France
- Died: 13 April 1845 (aged 81); Marseille, France
- Occupation: Politician

Barthélémy Thomas Strafforello (1764-1845) was a French politician. He served as a member of the Chamber of Deputies from 1820 to 1829. He was a Knight of the Legion of Honour.
