= Alessandro Bacci =

Italian footballer (born 1995)

Personal information
- Date of birth: 23 September 1995 (age 31)
- Place of birth: Agliana, Italy
- Height: 1.91 m (6 ft 3 in)
- Position: Goalkeeper

Youth career
- Pistoiese
- –2013: Fiorentina

Senior career*
Years	Team	Apps	(Gls)
2013–2016	Fiorentina	0	(0)
2013–2015	→ Tuttocuoio (loan)	68	(0)
2015–2016	→ Pisa (loan)	9	(0)
2016	→ Siena (loan)	1	(0)
2016–2018	Juve Stabia	4	(0)
2018–2019	Ascoli	3	(0)
2019–2020	Lecco	3	(0)
- * Club domestic league appearances and goals as of 18:18, 10 November 2019 (UTC)

Alessandro Bacci (born 23 September 1995) is an Italian football player.

== Club career ==
He is the product of Fiorentina youth teams. For 2013–14 season he joined Tuttocuoio (then in Serie C2) on loan and became the first-choice goalkeeper for the club. He made his Serie C debut for the club on 30 August 2014 in a game against Carrarese.

For the 2015–16 season, he joined Pisa on another loan. He was recalled from loan mid-season and was loaned to yet another Serie C club, Siena.

On 17 July 2016, he signed a two-year contract with Juve Stabia in Serie C. He served as backup with the team.

On 31 August 2018, he joined Serie B club Ascoli on a one-year deal. He made his debut in the second tier for Ascoli on 30 December 2018 in a game against Crotone.

On 5 July 2019, he signed with Serie C club Lecco for a term of one year with an additional one-year extension option.
