= Bartolomeo del Tintore =

Italian painter

Bartolomeo del Tintore was an Italian manuscript illuminator, active in Bologna in the 15th century from at least 1459 (prior to the 1473 arrival of Taddeo Crivelli). He was still active in Bologna in the 1490s.
