= Bartholomew Dowling =

Irish writer and poet (1823–1863)

Bartholomew Dowling (1823 – 20 November 1863) was an Irish writer.

== Biography ==
Dowling was born in Listowel, County Kerry. While he was still a child, his parents emigrated to Canada, where they remained for some years, and where Dowling received a part of his education. Returning to Ireland, after the death of the father, the family settled in Limerick, and older biographies misidentify Limerick as the city of Dowling's birth.

Burdened with the task of caring for his mother and younger brothers and sisters, Dowling did not follow literature as a profession. He published short pieces, mostly anonymously, while working in the mercantile trades for support. He traveled to California in the summer of 1852 and engaged in mining in the northern counties. Not finding this work congenial, he took to farming in Contra Costa, where he built himself a home and entertained John Mitchel, General James Shields, and Terence MacManus, as visitors.

In a lengthy poem titled "Reminiscences of the Mines", published in the Pioneer magazine for November, 1855, Dowling wrote of life in the mining camp. Sometimes he wrote under the pen-name of "Southern"; at other times over the initial letter of his surname; but his favorite signature was "Masque". In Edward Hayes's Ballad Poetry of Ireland, two of Dowling's works are printed anonymously, and only one bears his name.

In March 1858, P. J. Thomas, an enterprising publisher and one of the founders of the San Francisco Monitor, induced Dowling to quit the seclusion of Crucita Valley in Contra Costa County and move to San Francisco and work on that newspaper. Dowling became editor of the San Francisco Monitor, at a time when he was in poor health. However, he continued his writing, which "displayed a vigor and versatility that gave evidence of what he was capable of accomplishing under more favorable circumstances".

Dowling's death on 20 November 1863 resulted from his being thrown from a buggy and having his leg broken. His health previous to this shock had been declining, and he died in St. Mary's Hospital of San Francisco.

== Sources ==
- "Bartholomew Dowling" in Denis Oliver Crowley, Irish Poets and Novelists (1892) pp. 31–77.
