= São Bartolomeu de Regatos =

- Civil parish
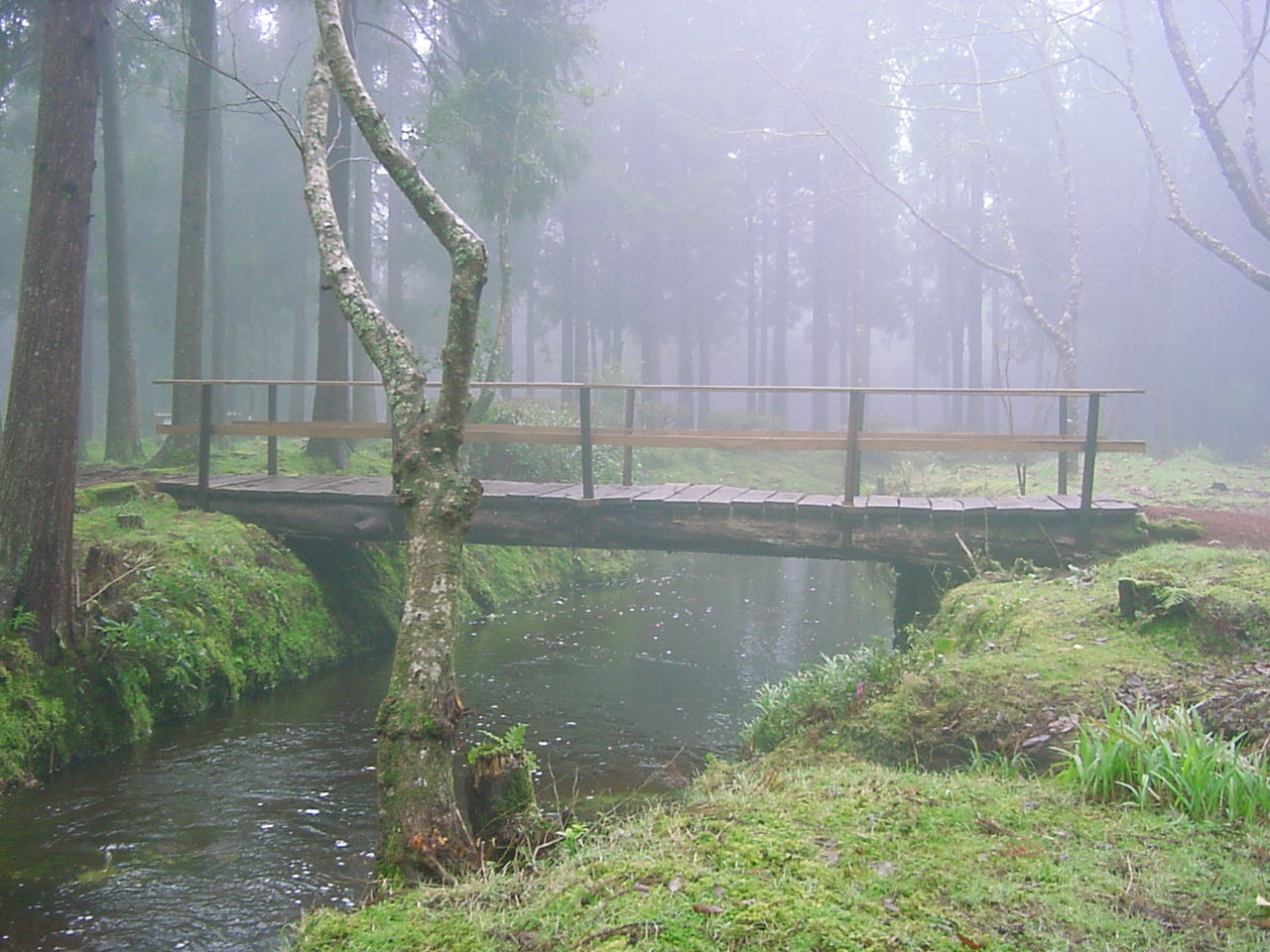
- A footbridge in the headlands of the Serra de Santa Bárbara, near Viveiros da Falca

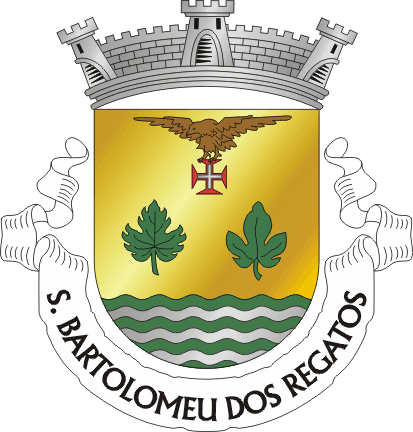
- Coat of arms

- Location in the Azores São Bartolomeu de Regatos (Terceira)
- Coordinates: 38°40′27″N 27°17′26″W
- Country: Portugal
- Auton. region: Azores
- Island: Terceira
- Municipality: Angra do Heroísmo
- Established: Settlement: c. 1500; Parish: c. 1560; Civil parish: 22 December 1939

Area
  - Total: 25.00 km^{2} (9.65 sq mi)
- Elevation: 118 m (387 ft)

Population (2011)
  - Total: 1,983
  - Density: 79.32/km^{2} (205.4/sq mi)
- Time zone: UTC−01:00 (AZOT)
  - Summer (DST): UTC+00:00 (AZOST)
- Postal code: 9700-579
- Area code: (+351) 292 XXX-XXXX
- Patron: São Bartolomeu

São Bartolomeu de Regatos is a parish in the municipality of Angra do Heroísmo on the island of Terceira in the Azores. The population in 2011 was 1,983, in an area of 25.00 km^{2} (9.65 sq mi). The parish lies at an elevation of 22 metres. It contains the localities Calçada, Canada da Igreja, Carneiros, Cruz dos Regatos, Cova dos Regatos, Outeirão, Outeiro, Pesqueiro, Regatos, São Bartolomeu dos Regatos and São José.

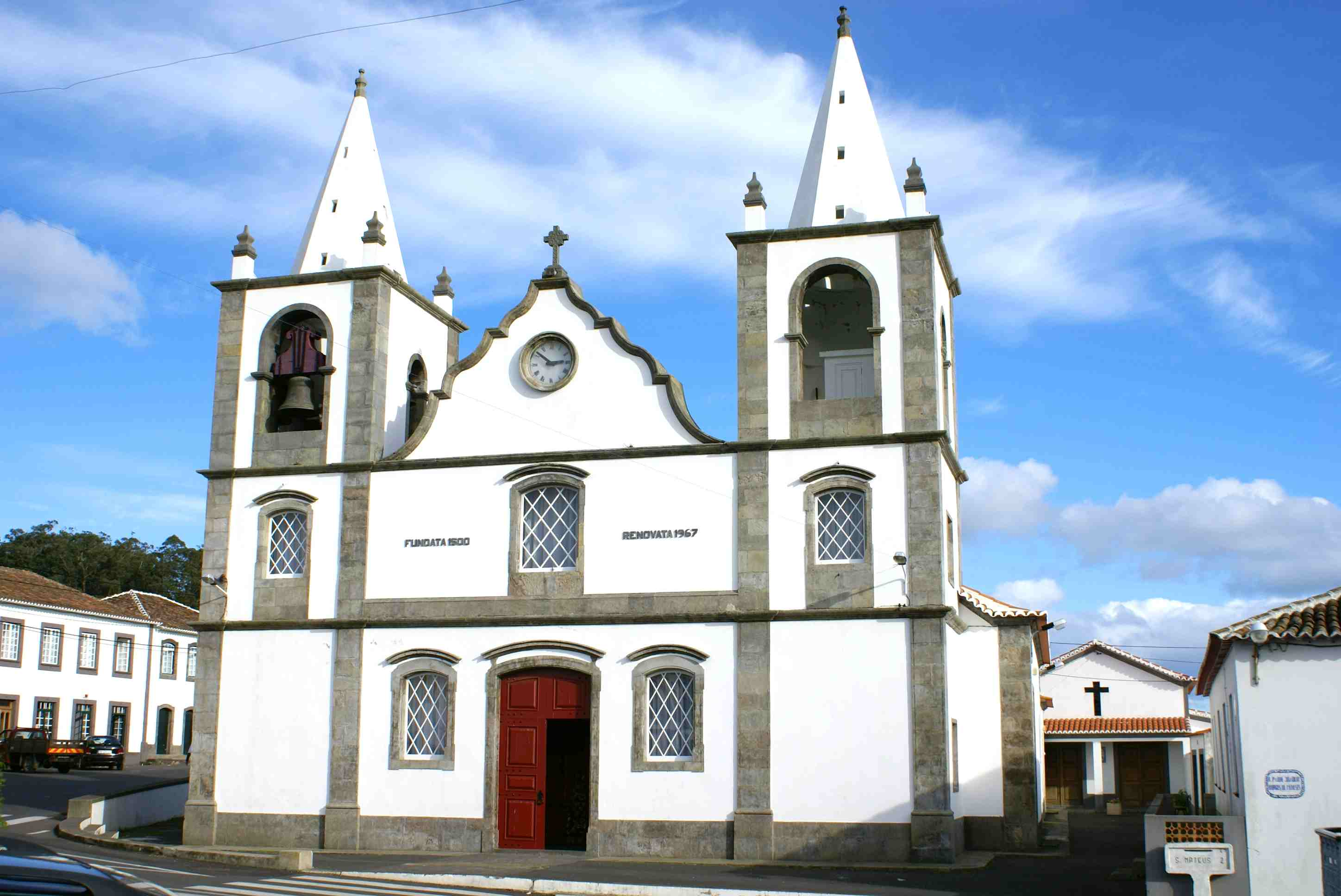
Church of Saint Bartholomew
