= Arthur Bartholomew (illustrator) =

English-born Australian illustrator (1833–1909)

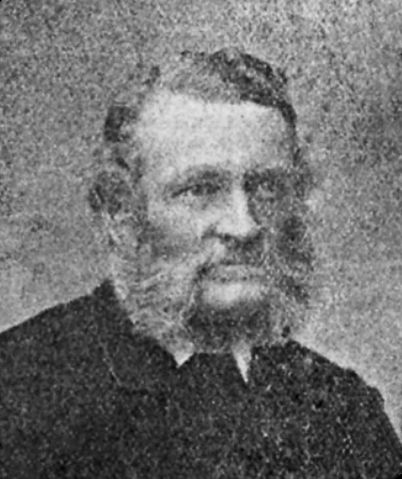
- Bartholomew in the 1880s
- Born: Arthur Bartholomew; 3 December 1833; Bruton, Somerset, England
- Died: 19 August 1909 (aged 75); Melbourne
- Occupations: Natural history illustrator, lithographer, engraver

Arthur Bartholomew (3 December 1833 – 19 August 1909) was an English-born Australian engraver, lithographer and natural history illustrator.

== Biography ==
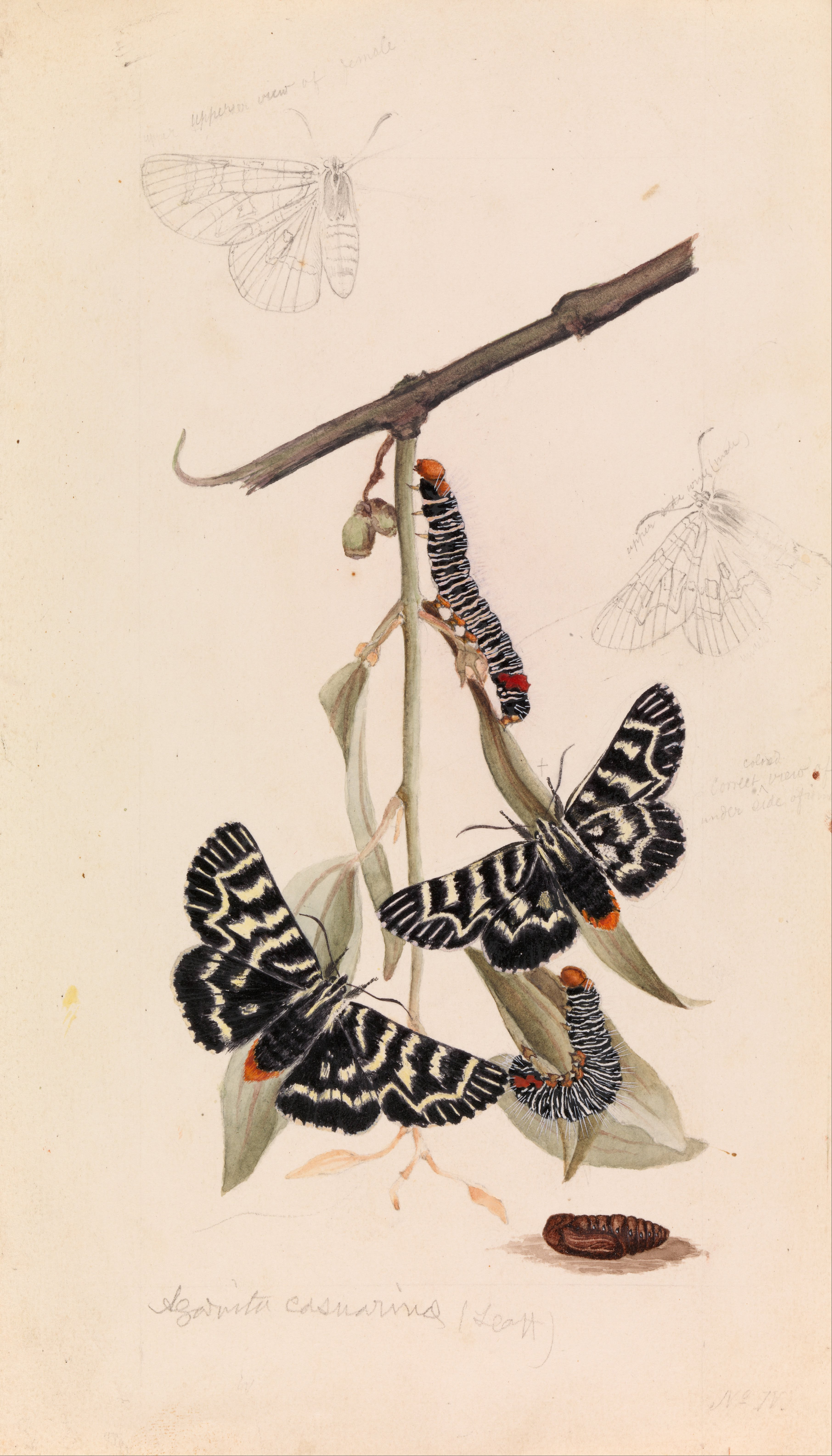
Mistletoe Moth (Comocrus behri).

Arthur Bartholomew was born on 3 December 1833 at Bruton in county Somerset, England, the son of a decorator Thomas Bartholomew and Charlotte (née Wright). He was apprenticed to an engraver in Exeter and acquired some training in lithography.

Bartholomew emigrated to Australia aged 18, arriving in Melbourne aboard the Oriental in December 1852. He spent the early period in Australia travelling around, including to Tasmania where he met his future wife, Eliza Nicholls.

After returning to Melbourne, Bartholomew became assistant to the zoologist William Blandowski, producing illustrations for his various projects.

At an exhibition held by the Victoria Industrial Society in November 1856, an artwork by Bartholomew (described as "water colour drawings, representing fish of Victoria") was included with a group of framed engravings sent by William Blandowski. In 1856 the Philosophical Institute of Victoria, with financial backing from the colonial government, initiated a scientific expedition to the Murray River led by Blandowski. The expedition camped on the south bank of the Murray River (near the site of present-day Mildura) between December 1856 and April 1857, from where specimens were collected and conveyed to Melbourne.^{[A]}

Prior to Blandowski's departure for the Murray River, Bartholomew travelled to northern Tasmania, where on 26 August 1856 he married Eliza Ann Nicholls at Longford. The couple remained in Tasmania until about mid-1859, where two of their children were born.^{[B]}

On 1 September 1859 Bartholomew was appointed as attendant to the zoologist and palaeontologist Frederick McCoy in the department of Natural History at the recently established Melbourne University. For the next six months he attended McCoy's lectures and assisted in work in the laboratory. Bartholomew was given increasing responsibility as McCoy became aware of his artistic talents and the potential of his contribution to future projects.

Bartholomew started on a series of zoological and geological illustrations, contributing to the Prodromus of the Zoology of Victoria and Prodromus of the Palaeontology of Victoria. In the next forty years he illustrated more than 700 natural history specimens as well as palaeontology and geological specimens. Bartholomew also transferred many drawings, of his own work and those of other artists, onto stone for the production of lithographs.

Bartholomew's illustrations were "characterised by a fastidious attention to detail and remarkable technical facility". Typically his methodical approach involved the successive application of watercolour glazes to build depth into his colour, occasionally applying layers of varnish if appropriate to the subject. His illustrations were usually completed in the laboratory, using specimens of varying quality and freshness made available to him. Insects and other small creatures were sometimes kept alive in the laboratory to facilitate studies of the live animal.

After McCoy's death in May 1899 Bartholomew retired from the university's Natural History department. He continued to illustrate for the Victorian Museum until his death.

At the time of his death in 1909 Bartholomew was living at 5 Newry Street, in the inner-city Melbourne suburb of Fitzroy North.

Arthur Bartholomew succumbed to a fatal stroke after a year of illness and died on 19 August 1909, aged 75.

== Gallery ==
A selection of images by Arthur Bartholomew
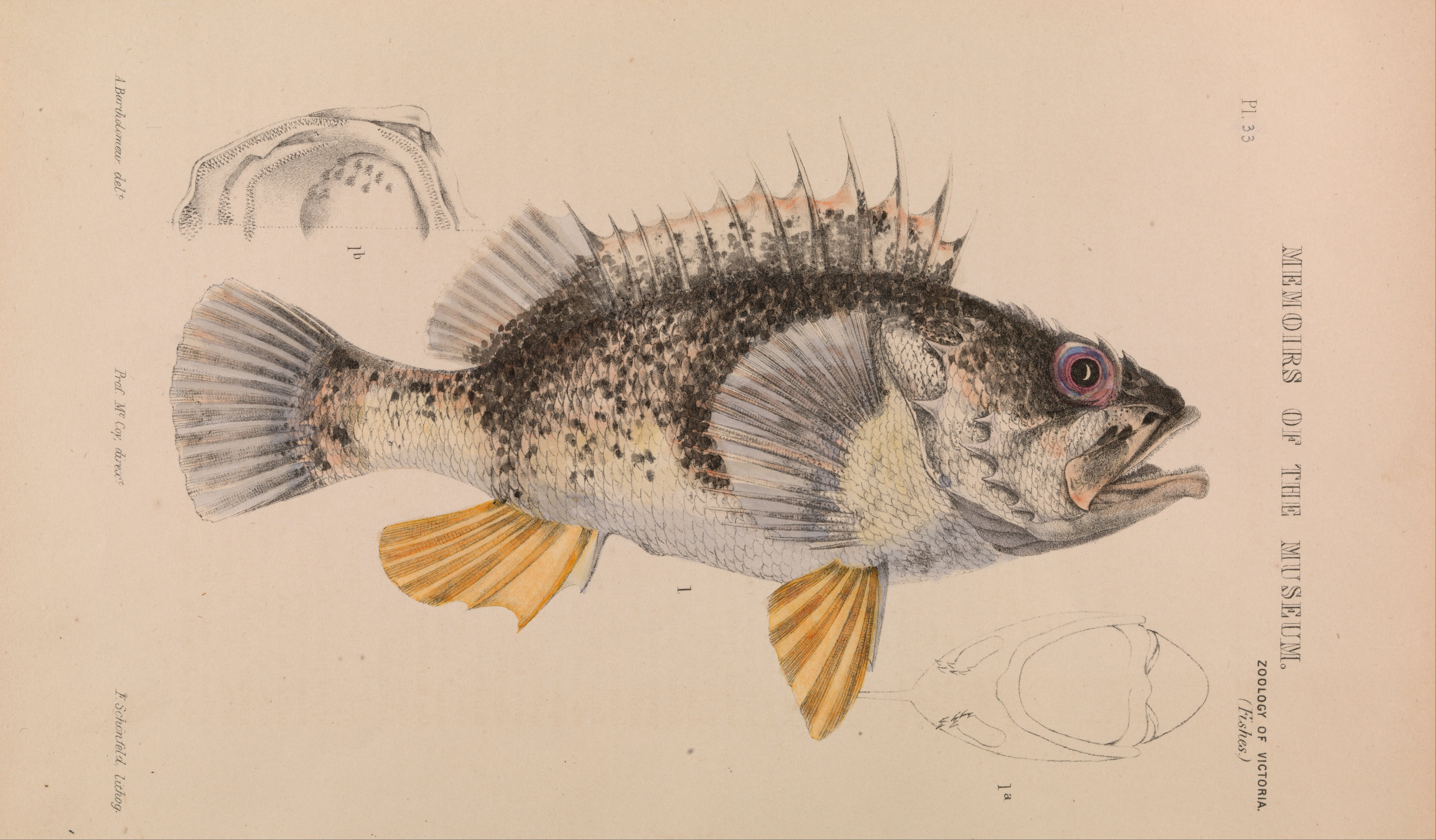
Reef Ocean Perch (Helicolenus percoides).

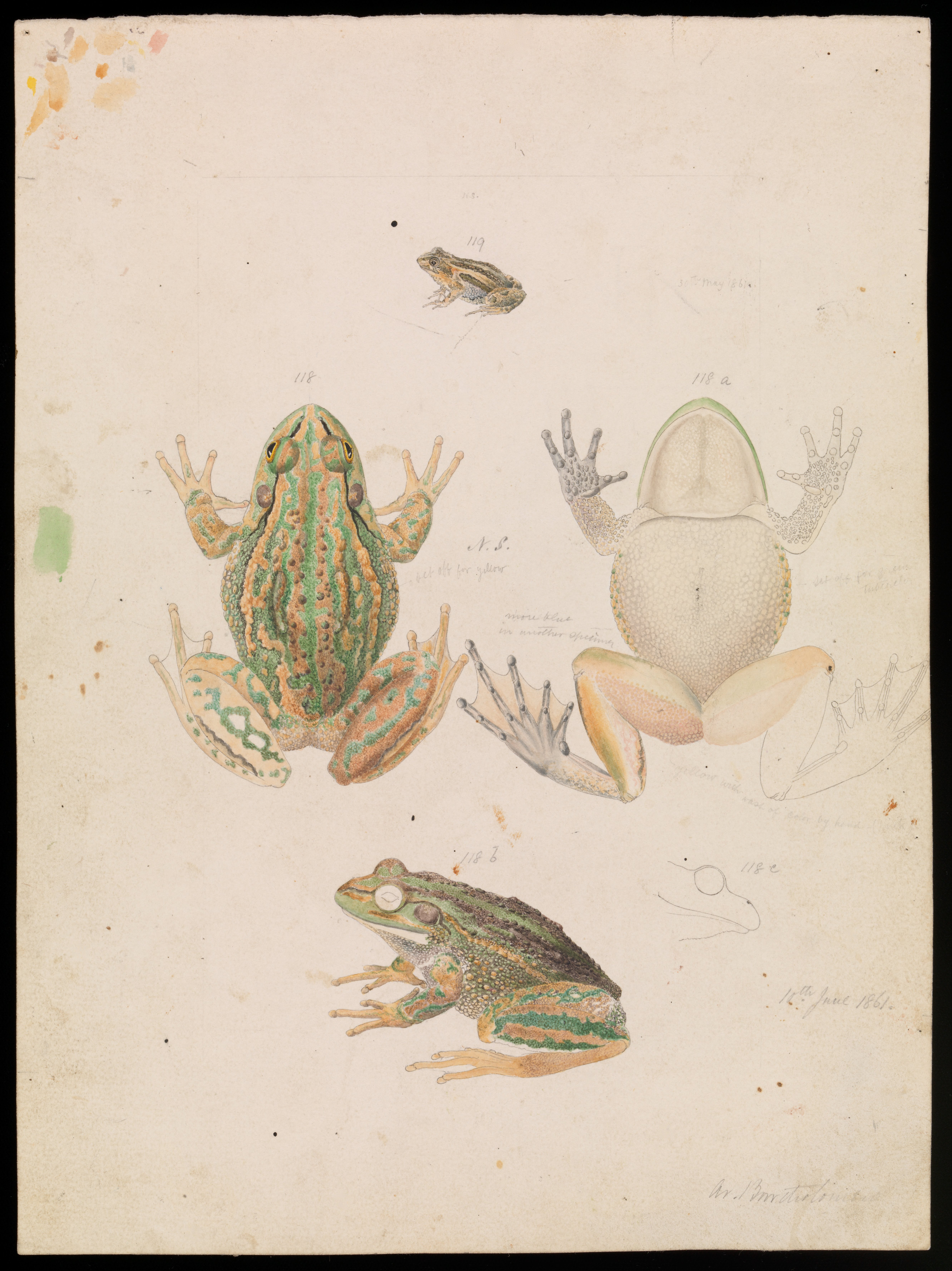
Growling Grass Frog (Litoria raniformis).

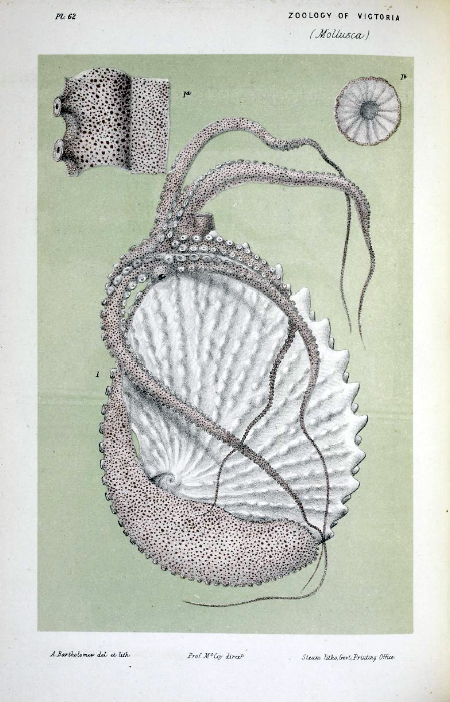
Knobbed Argonaut (Argonauta nodosa), with egg-case.

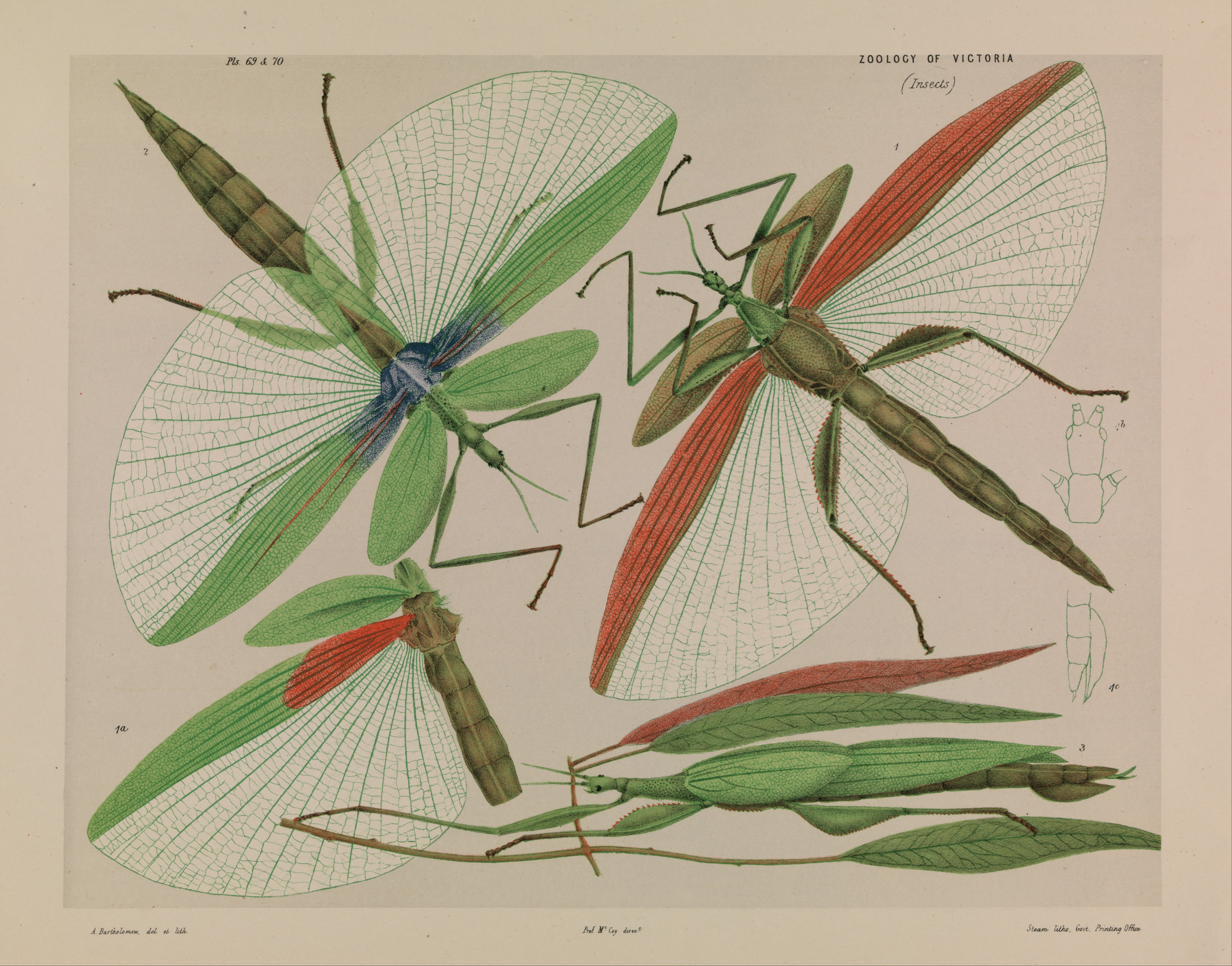
Red-shouldered Stick Insect (Tropidoderus rhodomus).

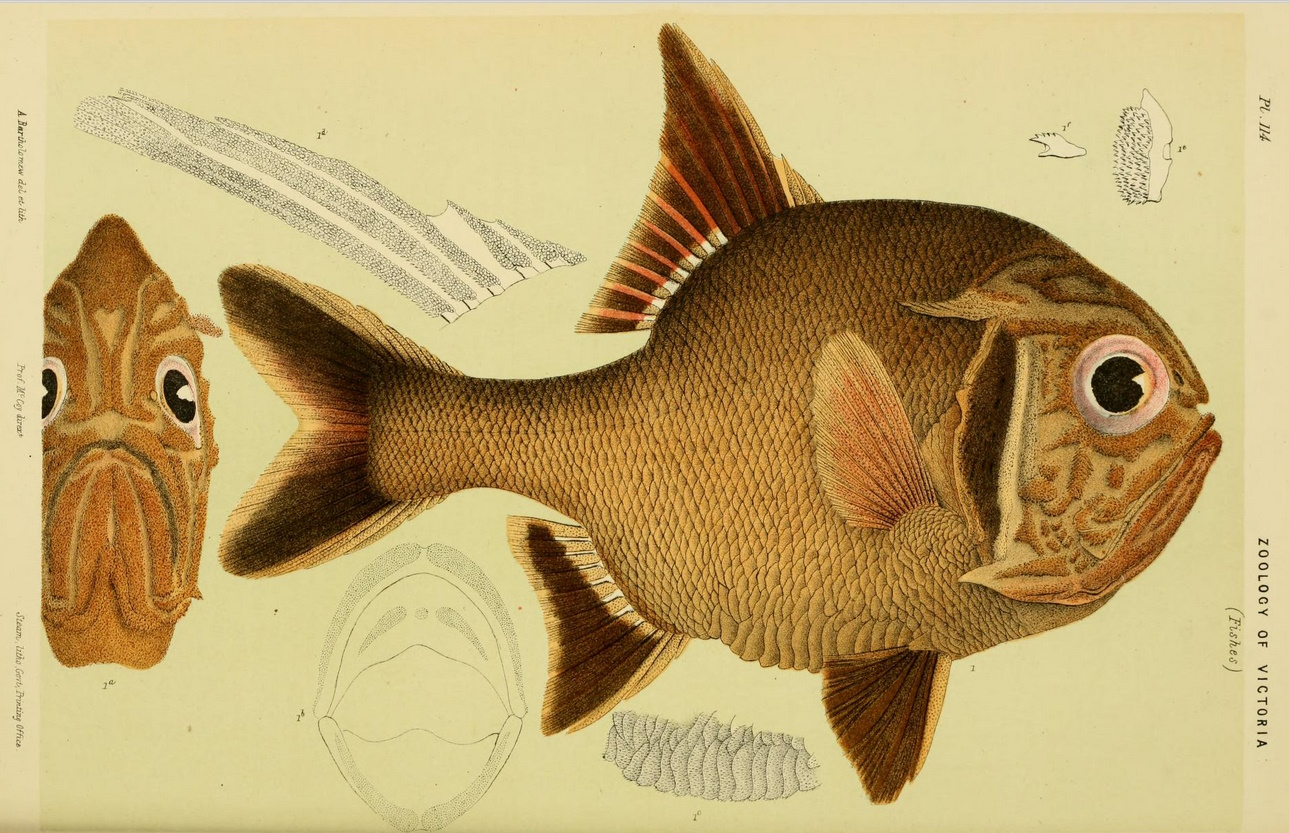
Southern Roughy (Trachichthys australis).

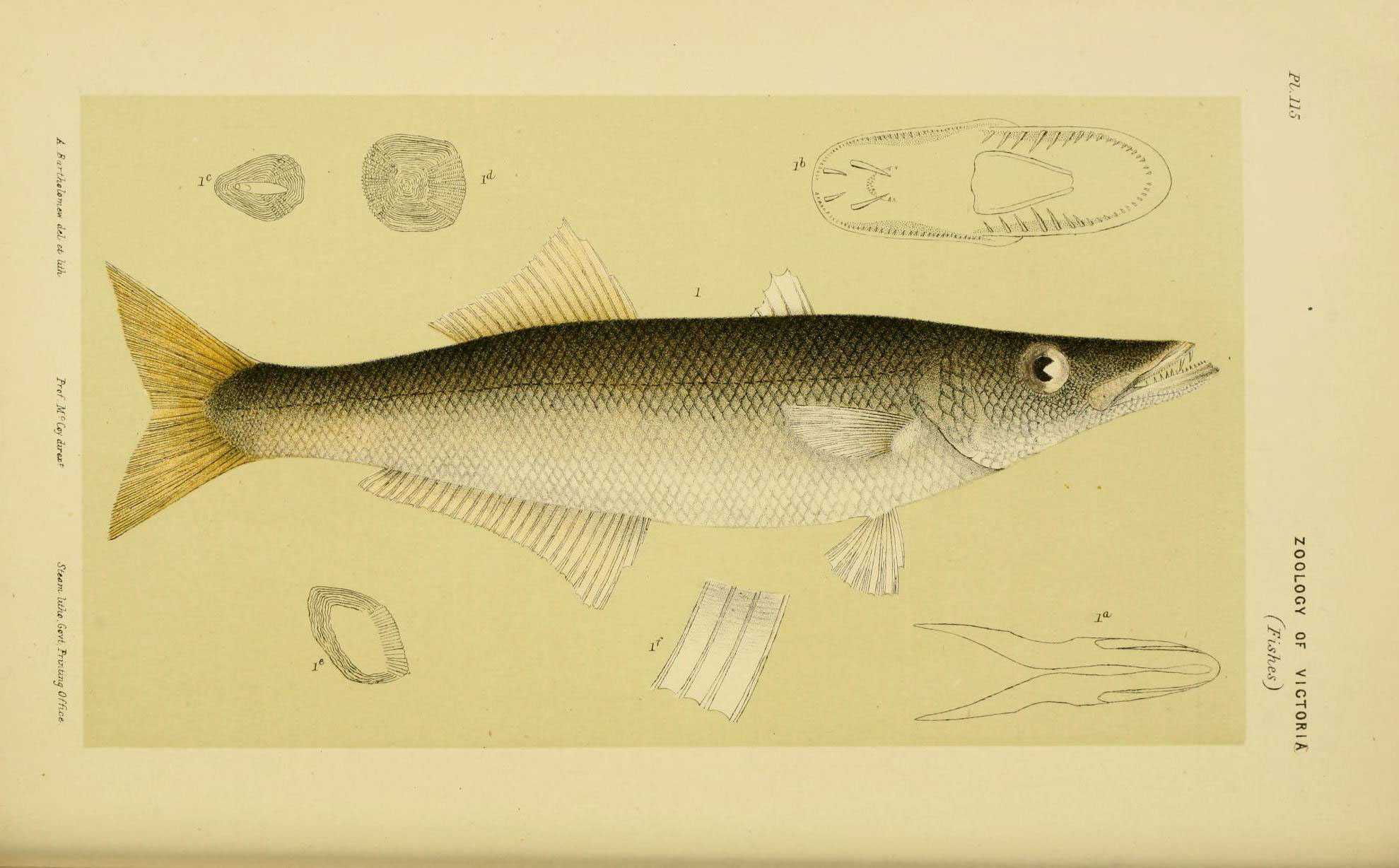
Long-finned Pike (Dinolestes lewini, syn. Lanioperca mordax).

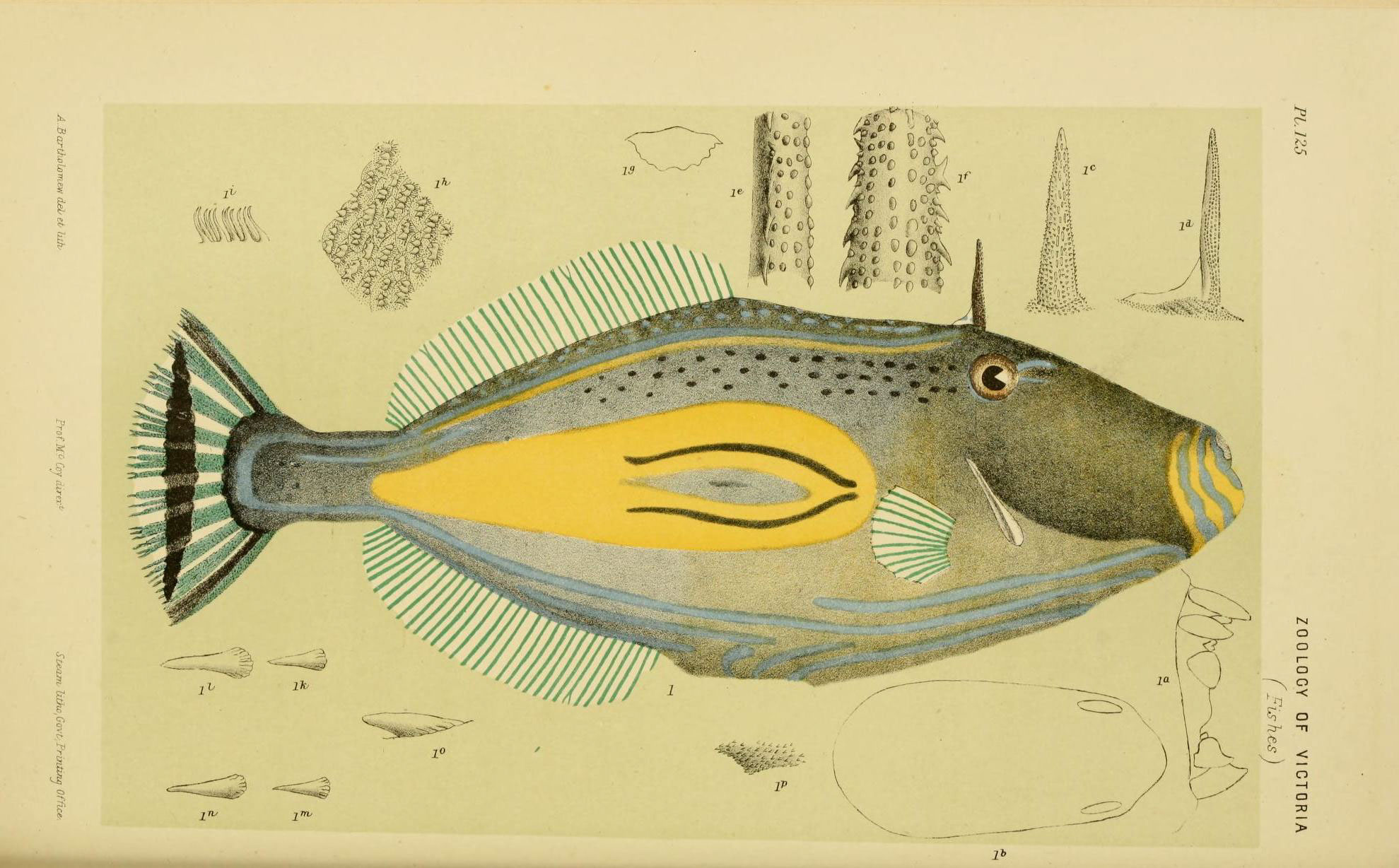
Horseshoe Leatherjacket (Meuschenia hippocrepis syn. Monacanthus hippocrepis).

== Notes ==
A.In March 1858 at the monthly meeting of the Philosophical Institute William Blandowski presented drawings of previously unknown fishes he had discovered on his scientific expedition to the Murray River between December 1856 and April 1857. It was found that several of the fish had been named by Blandowski "after distinguished members of the institute, and that the nomenclator had evidently been guided in his work by a presumed resemblance which the external appearance of the specimens bore to the personal characteristics of the philosophers whose patronymies were in future to have a place in zoological history". Blandowski's fishes bore species names such as Wilsonii, Macadamii and Irvingii and, for example, one fish was described as "big-bellied and flat-headed". The naming and descriptions of the fish species was the cause of controversy, with several members considering "that the whole was a gross caricature, and a most unjustifiable lampoon, instigated for the gratification of private malice". Professor Wilson and Rev. Bleasdale resigned their seats on the council board, claiming to have been deeply insulted. Blandowski declared that he "never entertained the remotest idea of either insulting or caricaturing his fellow members", but insisted his object was a complimentary one. After a couple of hours of "unprofitable discussion" the whole matter was referred to a select committee to report to the next meeting.

B.Arthur and Eliza Bartholomew had eight children. Christianna was born on 26 September 1857 in Longford and Ethelinda was born in 1858. After Bartholomew returned to Melbourne to work for Frederick McCoy at Melbourne University, the couple had a further six children: Arthur Hubert, born in 1861 in North Melbourne (died in 1862); Emma Edith born in 1863; Eliza Maud born in 1865 in Melbourne; Jessie Charlotte born in 1867 in Melbourne; Hubert Marion born in 1870 (died in 1873) and Arthur Percy born in 1873 in Collingwood.
