= Allen Bartholomew =

Australian forensic psychologist and criminologist (1925–2004)

Allen Austin Bartholomew
- Born: 23 October 1925; Mandatory Palestine
- Died: 19 June 2004 (aged 78); Melbourne, Australia
- Education: Caterham School; Westminster Hospital; Maudsley Hospital
- Known for: Development of criminology in Australia
- Scientific career
- Fields: Forensic psychiatry Criminology
- Institutions: Monash University; University of Melbourne

Allen Austin Bartholomew (23 October 1925 – 19 June 2004) was an Australian forensic psychologist and criminologist who played a major role in developing criminology in Australia.

== Career ==
Bartholomew negotiated with the University of Melbourne to establish both the Australian and New Zealand Society of Criminology (ANZSOC) and its official journal, the Australian and New Zealand Journal of Criminology, in 1967. He went on to serve as the journal's first editor-in-chief from 1968 to 1980.

In his honor, the ANZSOC and SAGE Publications jointly honor the best article published in the Australian and New Zealand Journal of Criminology in a given year with the Allen Austin Bartholomew Award.
