= Bartholomew of Bologna (philosopher) =

Bartholomew of Bologna (died c. 1294) was an Italian Franciscan scholastic philosopher. He was a follower of John Pecham.

He studied at the University of Bologna, and then for a degree at the University of Paris. He preached in Paris in (what was thought to be) 1270.

His works include the Tractatus de luce, on optics but from a spiritual angle.
