= Bartholomew of Bologna (missionary) =

Bartholomew of Bologna (died 1333), also known as Bartholomaeus Parvus (the Little), was a Dominican missionary, sent by Pope John XXII to Cilician Armenia, where he interacted with the Armenian nobles and the ruling Mongols.

== Biography ==
Bartholomew was consecrated a bishop, in charge of the city of Maragha. Arriving around 1318–1320, he learned the local language, built a monastery, and set to work converting many Armenians, including Nestorians and Muslims.

Bartholomew's work as bishop came to the attention of John of Kherna, the head of a nearby monastery, who sought him out in 1328. The two men worked together for a year and a half, culminating in a conference in Kherna. As a result, John, along with a large number of his monks, converted to Catholicism. In 1330, with Bartholomew's support, John founded the "Uniats of St Gregory the Illuminator", which later became part of the Dominican order.

Soon after, Bartholomew moved as bishop to Nachidiewan.

== Works ==
Bartholomew translated a number of works into the Armenian language. These included:

- the psalter
- some treatises of Augustine of Hippo
- the Summa contra Gentiles of Thomas Aquinas
- part of the Summa Theologica

He also wrote several original works, especially a work on casuistry and a treatise on the sacraments.
