= Bartolomé Lloveras =

Argentine footballer

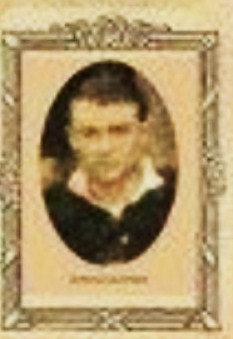

Personal information
- Date of birth: 1890s
- Place of birth: Buenos Aires, Argentina
- Date of death: 1950s
- Place of death: Buenos Aires, Argentina
- Position: Forward

Youth career
- 1907–1911: Club Atlético Banfield

Senior career*
Years	Team	Apps	(Gls)
1912–1913	Club Atlético Independiente		
- * Club domestic league appearances and goals

Bartolomé Lloveras (c. 1890 – c. 1950) was an Argentine footballer who played as a forward for Club Atlético Independiente

== Career ==
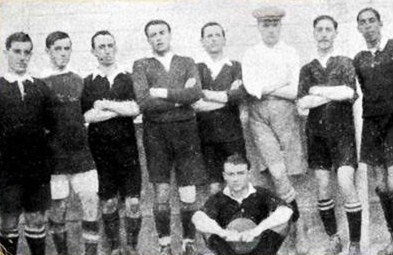
Independiente team 1912

Lloveras began his career at Club Atlético Banfield, in December 1910 had been part of the Banfield team who played twice for a place in the final for promotion to first division against Racing Club de Avellaneda. The first match ended goalless, and in the second match, Racing got a win in the last minute of the match. Racing finally played the final against Boca Juniors and won promotion to the first division. In 1911 Lloveras left the Banfield team to join reinforcements of Independiente. On July 5, 1912, Independente confirms their withdrawal from the Argentine Football Association and inclusion in the Argentine Football Federation where the First Division would have seven more teams: Argentino de Quilmes, Atlanta, Estudiantes de La Plata, Gimnasia y Esgrima de Buenos Aires, Kimberley, Porteño and Sociedad Sportiva Argentina. On August 14, 1912, Bartolomé Lloveras made its debut playing in First Division marking one of the three goals by Independiente in the 3–0 win over Kimberley. On December 22, 1912, Lloveras scored a goal in the Championship final between Independiente and Club Atlético Porteño (championship awarded to Porteño).
