= Bartolomé =

Bartolomé may refer to:

== People ==
- Bartolomé Abdala (born 1964), Argentine politician
- Bartolomé Bermejo (c.1440–c.1501), Spanish painter
- Bartolomé de las Casas (1484–1566), Spanish priest
- Bartolomé Castagnola (born 1970), Argentine polo player
- Bartolomé Colombo (1916–1989), Argentine footballer
- Bartolomé de Escobedo (1500–1563), Spanish composer
- Bartolomé Lloveras (c.1890–c.1950), Argentine footballer
- Bartolomé de Medina (mining specialist), (149?–15??), Spanish metallurgist
- Bartolomé de Medina (theologian), (1527–1581), Spanish theologian
- Bartolomé Mitre (1821–1906), Argentine statesman
- Bartolomé Esteban Murillo (1618–1682), Spanish painter
- Bartolomé Saravi (1797–1862), Argentine army officer

== Places ==
- Bartolomé Island (Spanish: Isla Bartolomé), a volcanic islet in the Galápagos Islands Group
- Isla Bartolomé, Diego Ramirez Islands, Chile

== See also ==
- Bartholomew (disambiguation)
