= Bodo (given name) =

Bodo (variants Botho, Boto, Boddo, Potho, Boda, Puoto, etc.) is an Old High German name, also adopted in Modern German. It is in origin a short name or hypocorism for Germanic names with a first element Bod-, Puot-, reflecting the verbal root beud-, meaning "to bid, command". As a monothematic name, the Old High German Boto and the Old Saxon Bodo could mean "lord, commander" or alternatively "messenger" (cf. Old English bod "command; message", boda "messenger, angel"). Full dithematic names with this first element (attested for the medieval period but not surviving into modern use) included Bodegisil, Bothad, Bodomar, Boderad, Poterich, Bodirid, Butwin, Potelfrid, Botolf, Podalolf, Bodenolf.

The Anglo-Saxon cognate is Beda (West Saxon Bīeda, Northumbrian Bǣda, Anglian Bēda).

== Middle Ages ==
- Bodo (deacon) (c. 814 – 876), German deacon who converted to Judaism, assuming the name of Eleazar
- Bodo VII, Count of Stolberg-Wernigerode (1375–1455), German count
- Bodo III, Count of Stolberg-Wernigerode (1467–1538), German count

== Modern era ==
- Bodo Abel (born 1948), German professor
- Bodo Andreass (born 1955), German boxing coach
- Bodo Battenberg (born 1963), German equestrian
- Bodo Baumgarten (1940–2022), German painter, sculptor, graphic artist, and educator
- Bodo Bischoff (born 1952), German musicologist and choral conductor
- Bodo Bittner (1940–2012), West German bobsledder
- Bodo Bockenauer (born 1940), German former figure skater
- Bodo von Borries (1905–1956), German physicist
- Bodo Dettke (born 1967), Solomon Islands politician
- Bodo von Dewitz (1950–2017), German art historian
- Bodo Ebhardt (1865–1945), German architect, architectural historian, and castle explorer
- Bodo Ferl (born 1959), East German retired bobsledder
- Bodo Hauser (1946–2004), German journalist and writer
- Bodo Hell (born 1943), Austrian writer
- Bodo von Hodenberg (1604–1650), German regional administrator and poet
- Bodo Hombach (born 1952), German politician
- Bodo Igesz (1935–2014), Dutch stage director
- Bodo Illgner (born 1967), German former football goalkeeper
- Bodo Kirchhoff (born 1948), German writer and novelist
- Bodo Klimpel (born 1963), German politician
- Bodo Kox (born 1977), Polish film director, actor, and screenwriter
- Bodo Kuhn (born 1967), German sprinter
- Bodo Lafferentz (1897–1974), German Nazi member and high-ranking SS officer
- Bodo Linnhoff (born 1948), chemical engineer and academic
- Bodo Lukowski (born 1961), German wrestler
- Bodo Otto (1711–1787), German-born American physician
- Bodo Ramelow (born 1956), German politician
- Bodo Rudwaleit (born 1957), German former football goalkeeper
- Bodo Sandberg (1914–2005), Dutch military pilot
- Bodo Schäfer (born 1960), German author and public speaker
- Bodo Schiffmann (born 1968), German doctor and conspiracy activist
- Bodo Schlegelmilch, business educator, academic, and marketing theorist
- Bodo Schmidt (born 1967), German football coach and former player
- Bodo Schopf (born 1959), German rock drummer
- Bodo Sieber (born 1979), German former international rugby union player
- Bodo Sperlein, German product designer and brand consultant
- Bodo Sperling (born 1952), German artist, painter, and inventor
- Bodo Spranz (1920–2007), German researcher, director, ethnologist, and World War II officer awarded the Knight's Cross of the Iron Cross with Oak Leaves
- Bodo Thyssen (1918–2004), German industrialist and medical doctor
- Bodo Tümmler (born 1943), German former middle-distance runner
- Bodo Uhse (1904–1963), German writer, journalist, and political activist
- Bodo Zimmermann (1886–1963), German general

== Botho ==
- Botho Elster (1894–1952), German major general in World War II
- Botho zu Eulenburg (1831–1912), Prussian statesman
- Botho Graef (1857–1917), German classical archaeologist and art historian
- Botho Hoefer (1880–1958), German art director
- Botho von Hülsen (1815–1886), German theater manager
- Botho Prinz zu Sayn-Wittgenstein-Hohenstein (1927–2008), German politician
- Botho Sigwart zu Eulenburg (1884–1915), German composer
- Botho Strauss (born 1944), German playwright, novelist, and essayist
- Botho von Wedel (1862–1943), German nobleman and a diplomat
