= Bartusevičius =

- Lithuanian surname
- m.: Bartusevičius
- f.: (unmarried): Bartusevičiūtė
- f.: (married): Bartusevičienė
- Related names: Bartashevich, Bartoszewicz, Bartosiewicz

Bartusevičius is a Lithuanian-language patronymic surname derived from the Polish diminutive Bartuś of the name Bartłomiej or Bartosz, both meaning Bartholomew. The suffix -ičius corresponds to the suffix -icz (Polish) or -ich (Belarusian), indicating the East Slavic origin of the surname. Notable people with the surname include:

- Ričardas Bartusevičius, Lithuanian musician, founded of the band Hiperbolė
- Loreta Bartusevičiūtė-Noreikienė (born 1958), Lithuanian ballet dancer
- Vincas Bartusevičius (1939–2020), activist in the German Lithuanian community, sociologist, pedagogue
