= Bartosz =

Bartosz is a Polish given name and a surname derived from Bartłomiej, the Polish cognate of Bartholomew.

== People with the given name ==
- Bartosz Arłukowicz, former Polish minister of health
- Bartosz Bajorek (born 2004), Polish footballer
- Bartosz Beda, Polish contemporary artist
- Bartosz Bednorz (born 1994), Polish volleyball player
- Bartosz Bereszyński (born 1992), Polish footballer
- Bartosz Białek (born 2001), Polish footballer
- Bartosz Białkowski (born 1987), Polish footballer
- Bartosz Bida (born 2001), Polish footballer
- Bartosz Bielenia (born 1992), Polish actor
- Bartosz Bosacki (born 1975), Polish footballer
- Bartosz Borkowski (born 2006), Polish footballer
- Bartosz Borowski (1978–2010), Polish activist
- Bartosz Brenes (born 1989), house DJ, producer, remixer and record label owner
- Bartosz Broniszewski (born 1988), German footballer
- Bartosz Brożek (born 1977), Polish philosopher and jurist
- Bartosz Brzęk (born 2005), Polish footballer
- Bartosz Chajdecki (born 1980), Polish composer
- Bartosz Cichocki (born 1976), Polish political scientist, historian and ambassador to Ukraine
- Bartosz Cybulski (born 2002), Polish footballer
- Bartosz Domański (born 1980), Polish figure skater
- Bartosz Dzierżanowski (born 1986), Polish volleyball player
- Bartosz Fabiniak (born 1982), Polish footballer
- Bartosz Fabiński (born 1986), Polish mixed martial artist
- Bartosz Filipiak (born 1994), Polish volleyball player
- Bartosz Frankowski (born 1986), Polish football referee
- Bartosz Gawryszewski (born 1985), Polish volleyball player
- Bartosz Gelner (born 1988), Polish actor
- Wojciech Bartosz Głowacki (1758–1794), Polish peasant and a member of the peasant volunteer infantry during the Kościuszko Uprising in 1794
- Bartosz Gorczak (born 1988), Polish Paralympic athlete
- Bartosz Grabowski (born 2000), Polish sprint canoeist
- Bartosz Grzelak (born 1978), Swedish football manager
- Bartosz Guzdek (born 2002), Polish footballer
- Bartosz Huzarski (born 1980), Polish road bicycle racer
- Bartosz Iwan (born 1984), Polish footballer
- Bartosz Jaroch (born 1995), Polish footballer
- Bartosz Jurecki (born 1979), Polish handball player
- Bartosz Kaniecki (born 1982), Polish footballer
- Bartosz Kapustka (born 1996), Polish footballer
- Bartosz Karwan (born 1976), Polish footballer
- Bartosz Kaśnikowski (born 1989), Polish footballer
- Bartosz Kieliba (born 1990), Polish footballer
- Bartosz Kizierowski (born 1977), Polish freestyle swimmer
- Bartosz Konitz (born 1984), Polish handball player
- Bartosz Konopko (born 1988), Polish short track speed skater
- Bartosz Kopacz (born 1992), Polish footballer
- Bartosz Koszała (born 1977), Polish film director, actor and screenwriter
- Bartosz Kowalczyk (born 1996), Polish handball player
- Bartosz Kurek (born 1988), Polish volleyball player
- Bartosz Ława (born 1979), Polish footballer
- Bartosz Łeszyk (born 1980), Polish futsal player
- Bartosz Łosiak (born 1992), Polish beach volleyball player
- Bartosz Machaj (born 1993), Polish footballer
- Bartosz Majewski (born 1987), Polish modern pentathlete
- Bartosz Mikos (born 1980), Polish archer
- Bartosz Nowak (born 1993), Polish footballer
- Bartosz Nowicki (born 1984), Polish middle-distance runner
- Bartosz Opania (born 1970), Polish actor
- Bartosz Osewski (born 1991), Polish javelin thrower
- Bartosz Paluchowski (born 1989), Polish pair skater
- Bartosz Papka (born 1993), Polish footballer
- Bartosz Paprocki (1543–1614), Polish and Czech writer, historiographer, translator, poet, herald and pioneer in the Polish and Czech genealogy
- Bartosz Pastuszka (born 1983), Polish businessman
- Bartosz Piasecki (born 1986), Norwegian fencer
- Bartosz Romańczuk (born 1983), Polish footballer
- Bartosz Rudyk (born 1998), Polish racing cyclist
- Bartosz Rymaniak (born 1989), Polish footballer
- Bartosz Salamon (born 1991), Polish footballer
- Bartosz Sienkiewicz (born 2001), Polish para-athlete
- Bartosz Sikora (born 1975), Polish swimmer
- Bartosz Slisz (born 1999), Polish footballer
- Bartosz Ślusarski (born 1981), Polish footballer
- Bartosz Soćko (born 1978), Polish chess Grandmaster
- Bartosz Sroga (born 1976), Polish rower
- Bartosz Szeliga (born 1993), Polish footballer
- Bartosz Szymoniak (born 1984), Polish singer
- Bartosz Tarachulski (born 1975), Polish footballer
- Bartosz Tyszkowski (born 1994), Polish athlete
- Bartosz Waglewski (born 1978), Polish rap artist
- Bartosz Warchoł (born 1992), Polish cyclist
- Bartosz Wegrzycki (born 2008), Polish person
- Bartosz Wolski (canoeist) (born 1980), American sprint canoer
- Bartosz Wolski (footballer) (born 1997), Polish footballer
- Bartosz Woroch (born 1984), Polish-born violinist
- Bartosz Zmarzlik (born 1995), Polish motorcycle speedway rider

== People with the surname ==
- Bogna Bartosz, Polish classical mezzo-soprano and alto.
- Jakub Bartosz (born 1996), Polish footballer
- Joanna Bartosz (born 1954), Polish gymnast

== Fictional characters with the name ==
- Bartosz Tiedemann, in the German science-fiction series Dark

== See also ==
- Bartek (disambiguation) (diminutive of Bartosz)
- Bartoszek (surname)
- Bartusz (surname)
