= Bartoszewicz =

Bartoszewicz is a Polish surname. Notable people with the surname include:

- Artur Bartoszewicz (born 1974), Polish economist
- Julian Bartoszewicz (1821–1870), Polish historian
- Kazimierz Bartoszewicz (1852–1930), Polish writer and historian
- Włodzimierz Bartoszewicz (1899–1983), Polish painter

== See also ==
- Bartosiewicz
- Bartashevich
