= Socha (surname) =

Socha is a surname of Slavic origin. It means statue in Czech and sokha in Polish. Socha is the surname of the following people:

- Aleksandra Socha (born 1982), Polish sabre fencer
- Alexandra Socha (born 1990), American actress
- Bartłomiej Socha (born 1981), Polish football player
- David Socha (1938–2025), American association football referee
- Ireneusz Socha (born 1964), Polish drummer and composer
- John Socha (born 1958), American software developer
- John Stewart Socha, American radio broadcaster and journalist
- Lauren Socha (born 1990), English actress
- Leopold Socha (1909–1946), Polish sewage inspector
- Małgorzata Socha (born 1980), Polish actress
- Michael Socha (born 1987), English actor, brother of Lauren
- Paweł Socha (bishop) (1935–2026), Polish Roman Catholic bishop
- Paweł Socha (footballer) (born 1985), Polish football goalkeeper
- Tadeusz Socha (born 1988), Polish football defender
- Vladimír Socha (born 1982), Czech writer, publisher, public lecturer and science promoter
