= Bartashevich =

Bartashevich is a Belarusian-language patronymic surname derived from the diminutive Bartash (Bartosz) of the name Bartholomew. Polish counterpart: Bartoszewicz, Russian : Bartoshevich, Lithuanian: Bartoševičius, Bartaševičius, Latvian: Bartaševičs, Bartoševičs. Notable people with the surname include:

- Marharyta Bartashevich (born 1990), Belarusian female acrobatic gymnast
- Yaroslava Bartashevich (2005), Russian female tennis player

== See also ==
- Bartusevičius
- Bartosiewicz
