= Bartłomiej =

- Gender: Male
- Name day: 29 January, 30 April, 5 July, 24 August, 3 September, 11 November

Origin
- Region of origin: Poland

Other names
- Related names: Bartek, Bartosz, Bartholomew, Barthélemy, Bartolomeo

Bartłomiej is a Polish masculine given name, a cognate of Bartholomew. Diminutive forms of Bartłomiej include Bartek and Bartosz.

== People named Bartłomiej ==
Notable people with the name Bartłomiej include:

=== A ===
- Bartłomiej Adamus (born 2000), Polish weightlifter

=== B ===
- Bartłomiej Babiarz (born 1989), Polish footballer
- Bartłomiej Bartnicki (born 1981), Polish Freestyle wrestler
- Bartłomiej Bartosiak (born 1991), Polish footballer
- Bartłomiej Bis (born 1997), Polish handball player
- Bartłomiej Bołądź (born 1994), Polish volleyball player
- Bartłomiej Bonk (born 1984), Polish weightlifter
- Bartłomiej Burman (born 2001), Polish footballer

=== C ===
- Bartłomiej Ciepiela (born 2001), Polish footballer
- Bartłomiej Chwalibogowski (born 1982), Polish footballer

=== D ===
- Bartłomiej Dąbrowski (born 1972), Polish tennis player
- Bartłomiej Drągowski (born 1997), Polish footballer
- Bartłomiej Dudzic (born 1988), Polish footballer

=== E ===
- Bartłomiej Eizenchart (born 2001), Polish footballer

=== F ===
- Bartłomiej Fogler (born 1985), Polish footballer

=== G ===
- Bartłomiej Groicki (c. 1534–1605), Polish jurist
- Bartłomiej Grzechnik (born 1993), Polish volleyball player
- Bartłomiej Grzelak (born 1981), Polish footballer

=== H ===
- Bartłomiej Heberla (born 1985), Polish chess Grandmaster

=== J ===
- Bartłomiej Jamróz (born 1973), Polish footballer
- Bartłomiej Jaszka (born 1983), Polish handball player
- Bartłomiej Jurecki (born 1979), Polish footballer

=== K ===
- Bartłomiej Kalinkowski (born 1994), Polish footballer
- Bartłomiej Kasprzak (born 1993), Polish footballer
- Bartłomiej Kasprzykowski (born 1977), Polish actor
- Bartłomiej Kluth (born 1992), Polish volleyball player
- Bartłomiej Konieczny (born 1981), Polish footballer
- Bartłomiej Kowalski (born 2002), Polish motorcycle speedway rider
- Bartłomiej Kruczek (born 19??), Polish slalom canoeist
- Bartłomiej Kubkowski (born 1995), Polish marathon swimmer

=== L ===
- Bartłomiej Lemański (born 1996), Polish volleyball player
- Bartłomiej Lipiński (born 1996), Polish volleyball player

=== M ===
- Bartłomiej Macieja (born 1977), Polish chess Grandmaster
- Bartłomiej Matysiak (born 1984), Polish racing cyclist
- Bartłomiej Mróz (born 1994), Polish para-badminton player

=== N ===
- Bartłomiej Niedziela (born 1985), Polish footballer
- Bartłomiej Niziol (born 1974), Polish violinist

=== O ===
- Bartłomiej Oleś (born 1972), Polish drummer, composer and record producer
- Bartłomiej Olszewski (born 1996), Polish footballer

=== P ===
- Bartłomiej Pacuszka (born 1990), Polish footballer
- Bartłomiej Pawełczak (born 1982), Polish rower
- Bartłomiej Pawłowski (born 1992), Polish footballer
- Bartłomiej Pękiel (fl. from 1633–died c. 1670), Polish classical music composer

=== S ===
- Bartłomiej Saczuk (born 1979), Polish cyclist
- Bartłomiej Sielewski (born 1984), Polish footballer
- Bartłomiej Sienkiewicz (born 1961), Polish politician
- Bartłomiej Smuczyński (born 1995), Polish footballer
- Bartłomiej Socha (born 1981), Polish footballer
- Bartłomiej Stój (born 1996), Polish athlete
- Bartłomiej Stolc (born 1983), Polish footballer
- Bartłomiej Świderski (born 1973), Polish actor and singer
- Bartłomiej Szrajber (born 1954), Polish politician

=== T ===
- Bartłomiej Tomczak (born 1985), Polish handball player
- Bartłomiej Topa (born 1967), Polish actor

=== U ===
- Bartłomiej Urbański (born 1998), Polish footballer

=== W ===
- Bartłomiej Wawak (born 1993), Polish cross-country skier
- Bartłomiej Wdowik (born 2000), Polish footballer
- Bartłomiej Wróblewski (born 1975), Polish politician, lecturer and lawyer

=== Z ===
- Bartłomiej Żynel (born 1998), Polish football player
