= Socha (disambiguation) =

Socha is a town and municipality in Colombia. Socha may also refer to

- Socha, Łódź Voivodeship, a village in Poland
- Chomętów-Socha, a village in Poland
- Socha (surname)
- Socha Na Tha, a 2005 Hindi-language film
