= Sovák =

Sovák (feminine: Sováková) is a Czech surname. Notable people with the surname include:

- Jan Sovák (1953–2025), Czech paleoartist, painter and illustrator
- Jiří Sovák (1920–2000), Czech actor

== See also ==
- For the Star Trek character "Sovak", see List of Star Trek characters (N–S)#Sovak
