= Paweł Socha =

Paweł Socha may refer to:

- Paweł Socha (bishop) (1935–2026), Polish Roman Catholic bishop
- Paweł Socha (footballer) (born 1991), Polish football player
