= Nataliya Ivanychuk =

Ukrainian translator

Natalia Ivanychuk
- Наталія Іваничук
- Born: Наталія Романівна Іваничук; November 29, 1959 (age 66); Shchyrets, Lviv Oblast, Ukrainian SSR, Soviet Union
- Education: Ivan Franko State University of Lviv
- Occupation: Literary translator
- Notable work: Translations of Jostein Gaarder, Tove Jansson, Knut Hamsun, Tarjei Vesaas
- Awards: Royal Norwegian Order of Merit (2018)

Natalia Romanivna Ivanychuk (Ukrainian: Наталія Романівна Іваничук; born 29 November 1959) is a Ukrainian literary translator from German, Norwegian, Swedish and Danish into Ukrainian. She is regarded as a leading mediator of Scandinavian literature in Ukraine and has translated works by Jostein Gaarder, Tove Jansson, Knut Hamsun, Tarjei Vesaas, Torgny Lindgren and others. In 2018 she was decorated with the Royal Norwegian Order of Merit for her contribution to promoting Norwegian literature in Ukraine.

== Early life and education ==
Natalia Ivanychuk was born on 29 November 1959 in the town of Shchyrets, Lviv Oblast, in what was then the Ukrainian SSR, Soviet Union. She is the daughter of Ukrainian writer Roman Ivanychuk and history teacher Sofiia Ivanychuk. In 1961 the family moved to Lviv, where she attended Secondary School No. 28 with advanced study of German.

Ivanychuk studied German language and literature at Ivan Franko State University in Lviv. According to later interviews, she completed her degree in the early 1980s and wrote a thesis on narrative technique, focusing on free indirect discourse in Thomas Mann's Buddenbrooks.

== Career ==
=== Academic and professional positions ===
After graduation, Ivanychuk taught German at higher education institutions in Lviv. In the 1980s she worked as a German language lecturer at the Lviv Medical Institute, now Danylo Halytsky Lviv National Medical University, and she also taught German language and literature at the Lviv Pedagogical College.

In the 1990s she moved into research, working at the Center for the Study of Periodicals of the V. Stefanyk Lviv National Scientific Library of Ukraine, and then returned to translation and teaching. She was employed as a translator for the Lviv publishing houses «Litopys» and «Misioner», and later joined the Department of Foreign Languages at Ivan Franko National University of Lviv, where she taught both German and Norwegian language.

From 2002 to 2004 Ivanychuk served as press and culture attaché at the Embassy of Ukraine in Finland, working on projects to promote Ukrainian culture abroad. After completing her diplomatic posting she returned to Lviv and continued to teach Norwegian at Ivan Franko National University, particularly for students in the Faculty of International Relations.

=== Nordic and Baltic academic initiatives ===
In the late 1990s Ivanychuk was among the initiators of institutional Nordic studies at Lviv University. She founded and headed a Center of Nordic Countries (Nordic Center) at Ivan Franko Lviv State University, which became a platform for the study of the societies and cultures of Norway, Sweden, Denmark, Finland and Iceland. The centre organised language courses, cultural events and visits by Nordic writers and scholars.

She also headed the Baltic University Programme Center Ukraine, a regional node of the international Baltic University Programme, which coordinates environmental and sustainable-development studies in the Baltic Sea region.

== Literary translation ==
=== General profile ===
Ivanychuk translates into Ukrainian from German, Norwegian, Swedish and Danish; she has also worked with Polish and Russian authors. She made her debut in literary translation in the late 1970s with translations of Norwegian poetry, and has since produced more than 160 book-length translations for various Ukrainian publishers.

A 2017 profile in Ukrainska Pravda. Zhyttia listed Ivanychuk among Ukrainian translators whose names serve as a mark of quality, highlighting her role in bringing Scandinavian literature into Ukrainian and noting her work on Tove Jansson and Jostein Gaarder in particular. In interviews she has spoken about deliberately choosing "difficult intellectual prose" and about the challenge of preserving the rhythm and humour of Scandinavian children's books in Ukrainian.

Her translations have appeared in Ukrainian literary and cultural periodicals including Vsesvit, Vitchyzna, Dzvin, Zhinka, Kurier Kryvbasu, Paradigma and Literaturnyi Lviv, as well as in numerous book publications.

=== Selected translations from German ===
Among German-language authors translated by Ivanychuk are:

- Leopold von Sacher-Masoch – Selected works; Venus in Furs
- Max Kruse – children's books of the Urmel cycle (Urmel from the Ice, Urmel Dives into the Sea, Urmel Flies into Space)
- Bodo Schäfer – children's books (A Dog Named Money, Kira and the Secret of the Bagel)
- Gustav Meyrink – The Golem
- Arthur Schnitzler – Casanova’s Return
- Marlen Haushofer – The Wall (Ukrainian translation published in 2020)

=== Selected translations from Norwegian ===
From Norwegian, Ivanychuk has translated, among others:

- Jostein Gaarder – novels and books for young readers, including Sophie's World, Vita brevis, Through a Glass, Darkly, The Orange Girl, The Castle in the Pyrenees, The Christmas Mystery and The Daughter
- Tarjei Vesaas – Selected works
- Knut Hamsun – Selected works and a separate translation of Hunger
- Anne-Cath. Vestly – numerous children's books (including the Eight Children and a Truck series)
- Crime and thriller novels by Tom Egeland, Chris Tvedt, Jørn Lier Horst and other contemporary Norwegian writers

=== Selected translations from Swedish ===
From Swedish she has translated:

- Tove Jansson – multiple books from the Moomin series and other works, including The Moomins and the Great Flood, Finn Family Moomintroll, Moominland Midwinter, Moominvalley in November and The Summer Book
- Zacharias Topelius – Fairy tales
- Anna-Lena Lauren – non-fiction works on Russia, the Caucasus and Ukraine
- Sofia Lundberg – The Red Address Book
- Frida Nilsson – children's and YA books, including Hedvig, The Ice Sea Pirates and Jagger, Jagger
- Torgny Lindgren – novels such as Palsa and Bathsheba

=== Other languages ===
In addition to German, Norwegian and Swedish, Ivanychuk has translated:

- From Danish – children's books and crime fiction, including Jakob Martin Strid's Mimbo Jimbo series, works by Kim Fupz Aakeson and Elsebeth Egholm
- From English – contemporary fiction, including Eliza Tait’s novel Romeo (Ukrainian edition published in 2023)

== Residencies, seminars and public activity ==
Ivanychuk has participated in international translation seminars, residencies and professional exchanges in Norway, Sweden and Finland. These include Ukraine–Norway literary days in Norway and in Lviv, programmes organised by NORLA (Norwegian Literature Abroad), and translator residencies in Oslo and other Norwegian cities. She regularly takes part in public discussions and presentations of translated literature in Lviv and other Ukrainian cities.

== Memberships ==
Ivanychuk is a member of the National Union of Writers of Ukraine and cooperates with professional translators’ associations in the Nordic countries.

== Awards and honours ==
In 2018 Ivanychuk was decorated with the Royal Norwegian Order of Merit in the rank of Knight First Class. NORLA described the honour as recognition of "her impressive work promoting Norwegian literature in Ukraine". The award was presented to her at the Norwegian Embassy in Kyiv, and Ukrainian media reported it as "the highest distinction of the King of Norway" for a translator from Lviv.

She has also received Ukrainian literary awards for translation, including a prize for her translation of Torgny Lindgren’s novel Palsa and recognition from Lviv’s UNESCO City of Literature programme, although these have been less widely reported internationally.

== Personal life ==
Ivanychuk lives in Lviv. She has spoken in interviews about growing up in a literary household as the daughter of novelist Roman Ivanychuk and about how this environment shaped her interest in languages and books.

== Selected bibliography (translated works) ==
Because many of Ivanychuk's translations have appeared with different publishers over several decades, only a small selection is listed here; a more complete bibliography is given in interviews and publisher catalogues.

- Jostein Gaarder – several novels and books for young readers (including Sophie's World and The Christmas Mystery).
- Tove Jansson – books from the Moomin series and other works.
- Knut Hamsun – selected novels, including Hunger.
- Tarjei Vesaas – selected prose.
- Gustav Meyrink – The Golem (Ukrainian translation).
