= Bartoszcze =

Bartoszcze is a Polish-language surname. It is a patronymic surname derived from the given name Bartosz. Notable people with this surname include:

- Roman Bartoszcze (1946–2015), Polish agrarian politician
- Jacek Bartoszcze (1961–2005), brigadier general of Polish Air Force
