= Bartok (disambiguation) =

Béla Bartók was a Hungarian composer.

Bartok may also refer to:

- Bartok (surname), other people with the name
- Bartok (compiler), an advanced compiler being developed by Microsoft Research
- Bartók Rádió, a Hungarian Public radio station
- Bartok (card game)
- Bartok (film), a 1964 television film
- Bartok, a fictional bat in the American films; Anastasia (1997) and its prequel Bartok the Magnificent (1999)
- Béla Bartók Boulevard, or Bartók for short, a major thoroughfare in Újbuda, Budapest, the continuation of the Small Boulevard on the Buda side

== See also ==
- Bartók Glacier, an Antarctic glacier
- Bartek (disambiguation)
