= Beda (name) =

Beda is a given name and surname of multiple origin.

As a masculine given name, it originates as an Old English monothematic name: West Saxon Bīeda, Northumbrian Bǣda, Anglian Bēda (the purported name of one of the Saxon founders of Portsmouth in AD 501 according to the Anglo-Saxon Chronicle), cognate with German Bodo. Beda Venerabilis was a Benedictine, in whose honour the name Beda was popularly chosen as a monastic name by Benedictines, and in modern times entered wider usage as a given name among Roman Catholics in continental Europe.

Béda is an unrelated Hungarian feminine given name.

Beda is also an unrelated Russian surname (from беда, "trouble, misery").

== Given name ==
- Beda (Beda Venerabilis, the Venerable Bede) (672/3–735), Anglo-Saxon monk and historian
- Beda Angehrn (born Johann Konrad, 1725–1796), prince-abbot of Saint Gall
- Bede Clifford (1890–1969), British colonial administrator and diplomat
- Beda Dudík (1815–1890), Benedictine Moravian historian
- Bede Durbidge (born 1983), Australian surfer
- Bede Jarrett (1881–1934) Dominican friar, Provincial of the English Dominicans, and founder of Blackfriars Priory, Oxford University
- Beda Stjernschantz (1867–1910), Finnish symbolist painter
- Beda Weber (1798–1859), German writer

== Surname ==
- Bartosz Beda, Polish contemporary artist
- Leonid Beda (1923–1995), Soviet Army officer
- Slavko Beda (1919–1975), Croatian footballer
- Pedro Beda (born 1989), Brazilian footballer

== Pseudonym ==
- pen name of Fritz Löhner-Beda (1883–1942), short form of his given name Bedřich
