= Bartoszek =

Bartoszek is a Polish surname. Notable people with the surname include:

- Danuta Bartoszek (born 1961), Polish-Canadian long-distance runner
- Maciej Bartoszek (born 1977), Polish football manager
- Pawel Bartoszek (born 1980), Icelandic mathematician and politician

== See also ==
- Bartosz
