= Bodo Sperlein =

German industrial designer

- Born: Germany
- Occupations: Designer, Creative Director
- Website: www.bodosperlein.com

Bodo Sperlein is a German-born designer based in London, known for his work across multiple disciplines, including luxury homeware, lighting, tableware, and consumer electronics. His designs merge traditional craftsmanship with contemporary aesthetics, and he has collaborated with internationally renowned brands across Europe, Asia, and the Americas. He is the creative director of the brand 'Bodo Sperlein' - a creative consultancy and luxury product design studio based in the Oxo Tower in London.

His works are in permanent museum collections, including Die Neue Sammlung in Munich. His work has also been exhibited at major institutions, including Pinakothek der Moderne in Munich, the Victoria & Albert Museum (V&A) in London, and the Valencia Fine Arts Museum in Spain.

Sperlein has designed design exhibitions, including ‘Jugendstil. Made in Munich’ at the Kunsthalle München (2024), in collaboration with the Münchner Stadtmuseum; ‘Illuminata’ at the Chiesa Cristiana Protestante for Milan Design Week (2023); and his annual design exhibition 'Menu' held during Milan Design Week (2024-).

== Early Career ==
Sperlein studied 3-D Design at Camberwell College of Arts (part of the University of the Arts London). After graduating, he remained in the United Kingdom, establishing his London-based studio in 2000.

Sperlein gained early recognition through his collaboration with Browns, the influential London fashion store widely regarded as a pioneer in shaping trends and defining contemporary luxury. His homeware collection for Browns was a significant milestone in his career, positioning him within the high-end design sector. Sperlein worked with Nymphenburg, the German porcelain manufacturer founded in 1747, to create a large collection spanning tableware, lighting, and sculptural pieces. His designs for Nymphenburg brought a contemporary perspective to the brand's centuries-old porcelain-making traditions.

In 2008, Bodo was invited to participate Swarovski Crystal Wedding Project, creating table decorations inspired by the institution of marriage. Sperlein also designed the original perfume bottle for Agent Provocateur under the leadership of its founder, Joseph Corré.

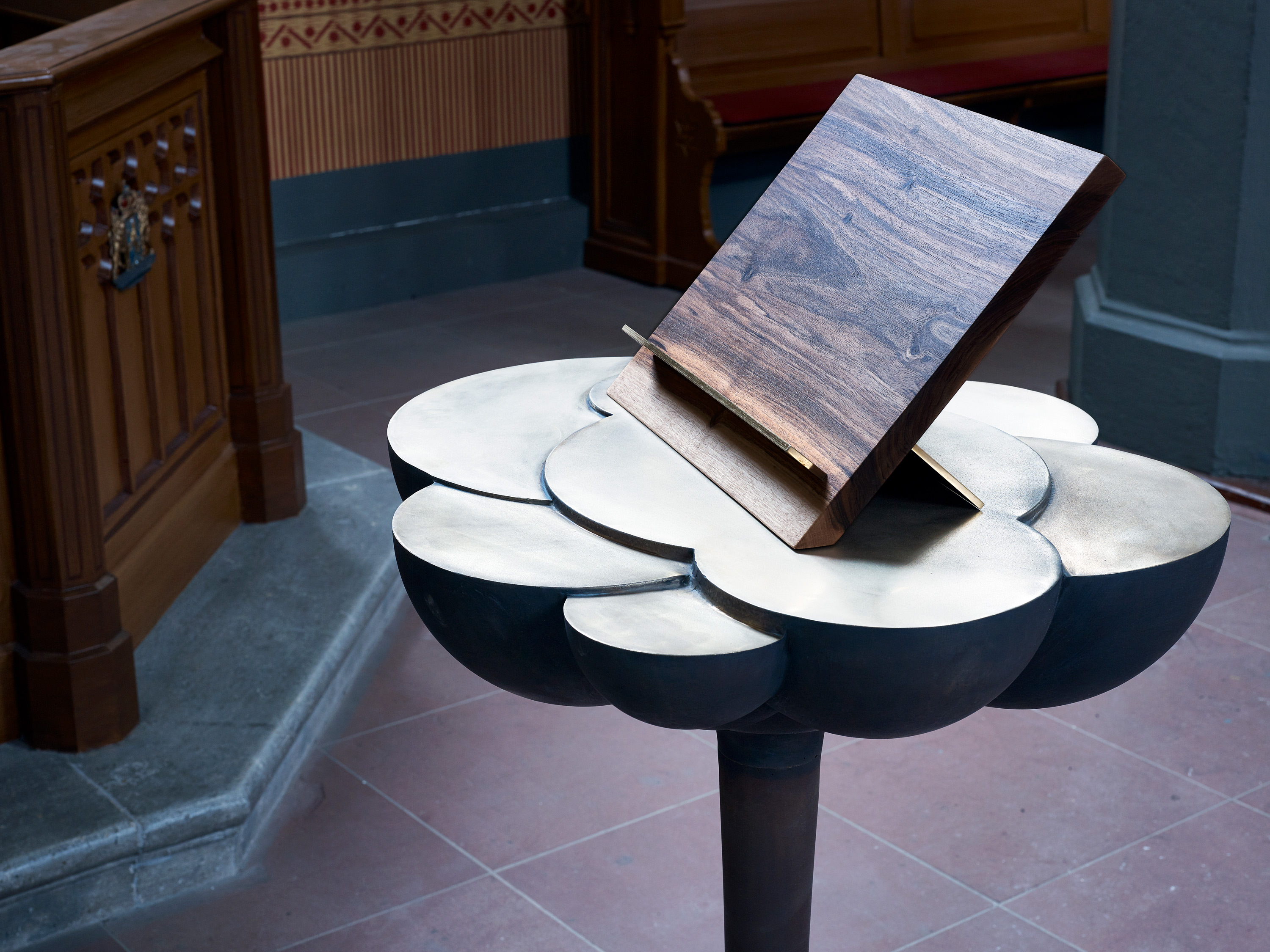
Triangelis commission (Michael Donath)

In 2016, Sperlein was commissioned to design liturgical furnishings for Johanneskirche in Erbach, Germany. The Triangelis project, which included a font, ambo, and candle holder, was part of a larger renovation effort, integrating modern design into a neo-Gothic church setting.

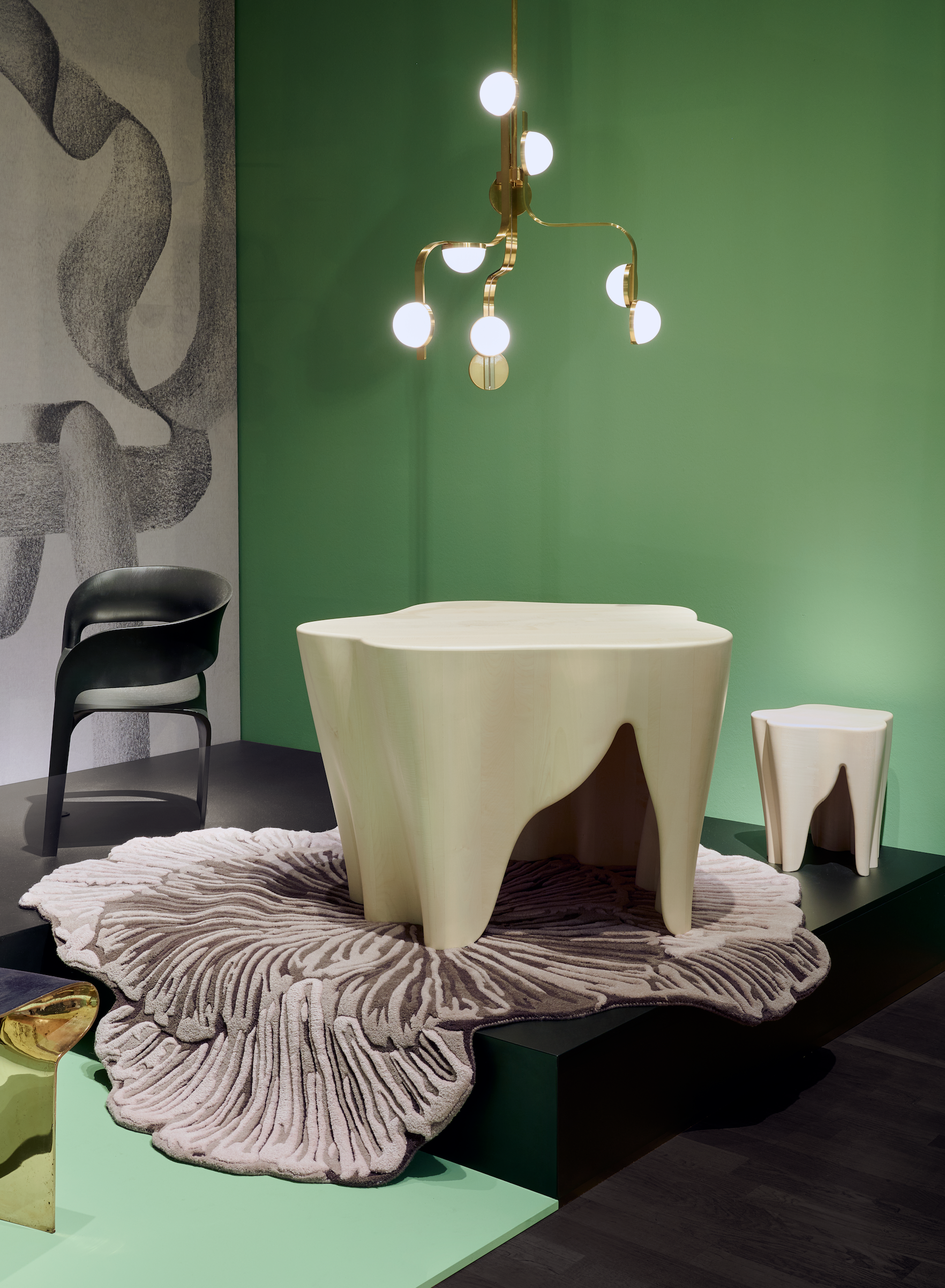
Jugendstil. Made in Munich exhibition - Kunsthalle München 2024

From 2016 to 2018, Sperlein served as Creative Director for Loewe, the German consumer electronics brand. During this period, he designed the Bild 9 and Bild 5 televisions. Sperlein's tenure at Loewe concluded following the company's insolvency and restructuring under new ownership.

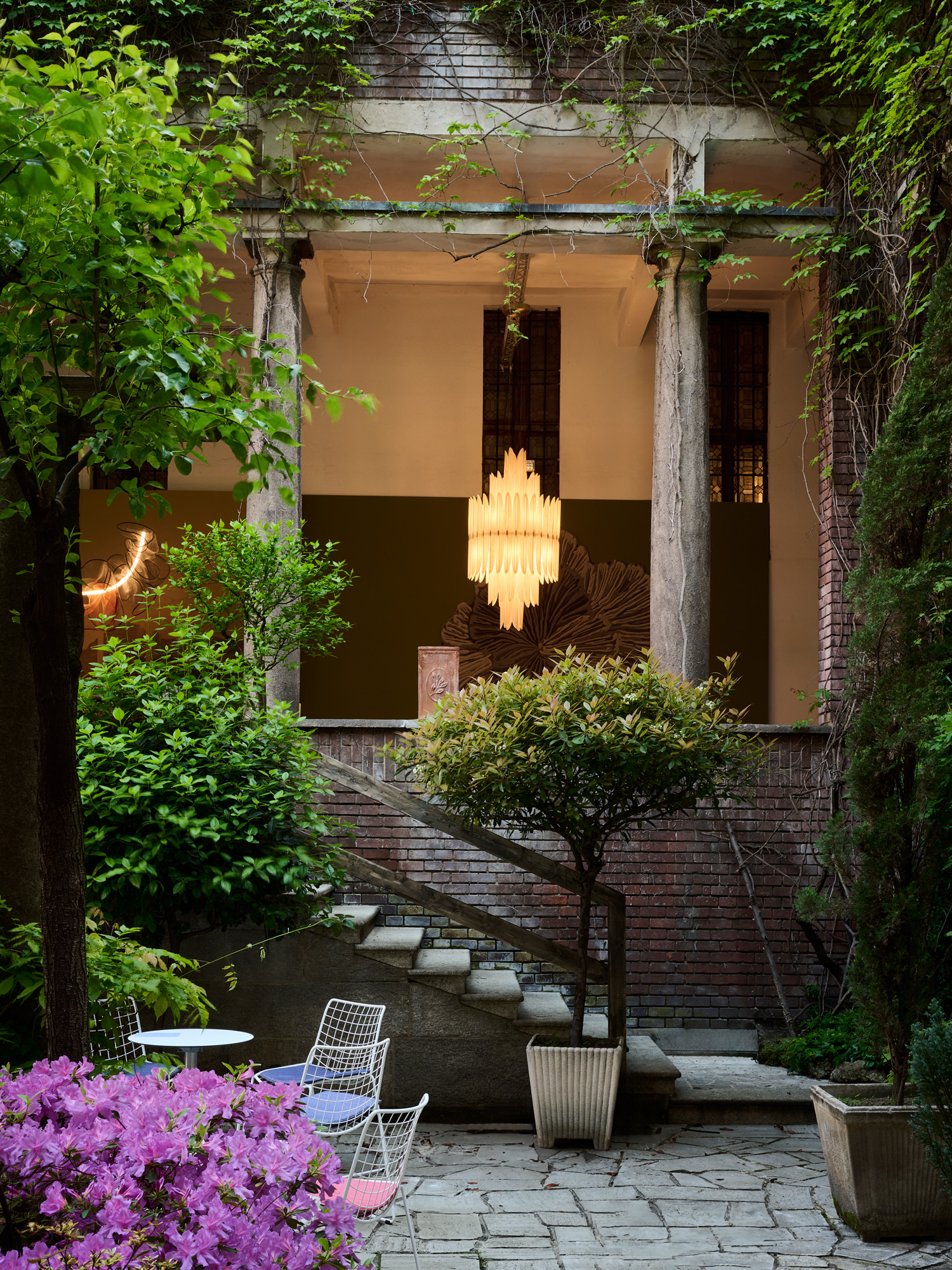
Voliere chandelier for Lzf at 'Menu 1' for Milan Design Week 2024 (Fabian Frinzel)

== Selected Works ==
His repertoire includes furniture, homeware and tableware. Sperlein collaborated with Tane, the renowned Mexican silverware brand founded in 1942, to design an extensive collection of silver objects. He designed several collections for Dibbern, including the Black Forest collection, which is widely used in Michelin-starred restaurants worldwide, including Le Jardinier, The Five Fields, and Pied à Terre. Sperlein has worked extensively in Japan, collaborating with Nikko, one of the country's leading porcelain manufacturers. He also created numerous projects for Lladró, a global leader in luxury porcelain, including tableware, lighting, and jewellery.

With an interest in materiality, Sperlein's work expands across multiple disciplines, working with numerous specialist manufacturers, including glass for VAN TREECK, porcelain for Meissen, and concrete for Gravelli.

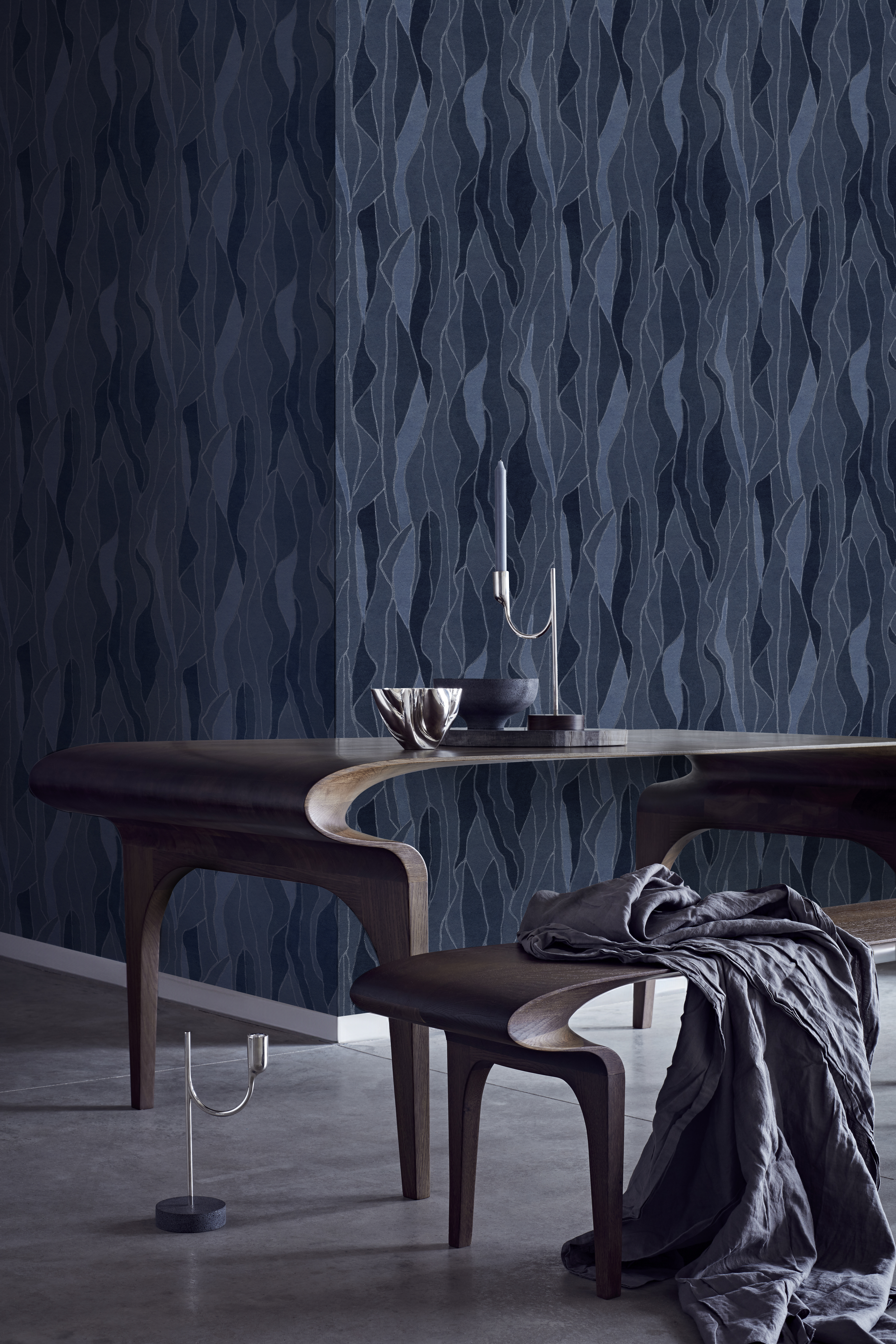
'Collage' wallpaper for Coordonné, Contourline furniture and Tane Silverware (Jon Day)

Sperlein's work receives international acclaim and has been featured in prestigious lifestyle and business publications, including Architectural Digest, Financial Times, Vogue Living, Elle Decoration and Est Living

Alongside his permanent product collections, Sperlein has also developed bespoke projects and commissions for leading luxury houses including Louis Vuitton and Mulberry.

== Exhibitions ==
Since 2024, Sperlein has curated, art directed and architecturally designed his annual exhibition MENU, held during Fuorisalone at Milan Design Week in the Brera Design District. In 2025, this included the design of a seven-metre sculptural table, and a central installation of the 'Botanica' Collection, a rug designed for GAN Rugs, which has gained international recognition, being short-listed for the Dezeen Awards and becoming an honoree in the NYCxDESIGN Awards. For the 2026 edition, he premiered new collaborative works with eight international brands: Meissen, Lobmeyr Lighting, LZF Lamps, Orea AG, Morath Solutions, VAN TREECK, Garpa and Gravelli.

In 2024, he conceived the exhibition architecture and spatial design for Judendstil: Made in Munich at Kunsthalle München, a major exhibition created in collaboration with the Munich City Museum. Bringing together more than four hundred objects across ten thematic chapters, the exhibition examined Munich's contribution to the Art Nouveau movement.

His work is represented by renowned galleries such as Les Ateliers Courbet in New York and 88 Gallery in London, as well as several solo exhibitions at Andreas Murkudis in Berlin, and he is often a speaker on panel talks including the 2020 SZ Kultursalon.

== Awards ==
Lord Sainsbury Award 1998

Land Rover BORN Award 2017

iF Design Award 2018 - Loewe bild 5 oled

Design Intelligence Award 2018 - Loewe bild 5 oled

Wallpaper* Design Award 2020 - Onda Centrepiece

Delta Adi Awards 2024 - Bronze - Osca for Lzf

AD 100 Recognition 2025

Falstaff Living Design Award Lighting - Orchid for Lobmeyr
