= Bartkus =

Bartkus is the masculine form of a Lithuanian family name. Its feminine forms are: Bartkuvienė (married woman or widow) and Bartkutė (unmarried woman). The (masculine) name is actually a diminutive of the given name Bartolomejus - Bartholomew.

The surname may refer to:

- Džiugas Bartkus (born 1989), Lithuanian footballer
- Frank Bartkus (1915–1986), a U.S. soccer goalkeeper
- Gintautas Bartkus (b. 1966), Lithuanian lawyer, Justice minister
- Petras Bartkus, Lithuanian anti-Soviet partisan
- Ray Bartkus (b. 1961) is a Lithuanian artist
- Vitalija Bartkuvienė (1939–1966), Lithuanian painter
- Guy Edward Bartkus (1999–2025), the perpetrator of the 2025 Palm Springs fertility clinic bombing

== See also ==
- Bartkus v. Illinois, is a decision of the U.S. Supreme Court, 1959.
- Bartek, a similar Polish name
