= Bartek =

Bartek (Czech and Slovak feminine: Bartková or Barteková) is a Czech, Polish and Slovak surname, a diminutive of the given names Bartoloměj in Czech, Bartłomiej and Bartosz in Polish, and Bartolomej in Slovak, all being variants of the name Bartholomew. In Polish, it can be also used as a given name. Notable people with these names include:

== Surname ==
- Danka Barteková (born 1984), Slovak skeet shooter
- David Bartek (born 1988), Czech footballer
- Ivan Bartek (born 1989), Slovak Muay Thai fighter and kickboxer
- Jakub Bartek (born 1992), Slovak footballer
- Martin Bartek (born 1980), Slovak ice hockey player
- Steve Bartek (born 1952), American musician
- Tomáš Bartek (born 1958), Czech handball player

== Given name ==
- Bartek Sylwestrzak, Polish football manager

== See also ==
- Bartłomiej Kasprzykowski (born 1977), Polish actor, also known as Bartek Kasprzykowski
- Bartłomiej Niziol (born 1974), Polish violinist, also known as Bartek Nizion
- Bartok (disambiguation)
- Bartkus, a similar Lithuanian name
