= The Last Days of Dinosaurs =

First edition (publ. Radioservis)

The Last Days of Dinosaurs (in Czech original Poslední dny dinosaurů) is a science-fiction thriller from Czech writer and science promoter Vladimír Socha. Its story is about four audacious people who undergo a time travel to the very end of the Cretaceous period 66 million years ago. Not only must they find a way how to evade the Armageddon caused by the giant asteroid (Chicxulub) impact, they also have to save themselves from the dangerous theropod dinosaurs (like Tyrannosaurus or Dakotaraptor) and even a mad scientist who wants to change the course of evolution history on Earth. But even that is not the most impressive mystery the visitors from the future encounter in the last two days of a mesozoic era...

The book was published on May 6, 2016 by Prague-based Radioservis (publisher of the Czech Radio). It has 320 pages, hard cover and its size is 21 x 14 cm. The story takes place in prehistoric Montana at the end of the Cretaceous, in what is now known as the ecosystem of the Hell Creek formation.

== Sources ==
- Book profile on the Book Datadase web (in Czech)
- Book profile on the Czech Book Database web (in Czech)
- Short video about the book on YouTube (in Czech)
- About the book on Wild Prehistory website (in Czech)
- About the book on the Book Diary website (in Czech)
- Book profile on the publisher's website Radioteka.cz
