= Bartusz =

Bartusz is a surname. The Slovak feminine form is Bartuszová. Notable people with the surname include:

- Juraj Bartusz (1933–2025), Slovak sculptor
- Mária Bartuszová (1936–1996), Slovak sculptor, wife of Juraj
- Maria Bartusz (born 1987), Polish international para badminton player

== See also ==
- Bartosz, a Polish given name and surname
