= Joachim Bartoszewicz =

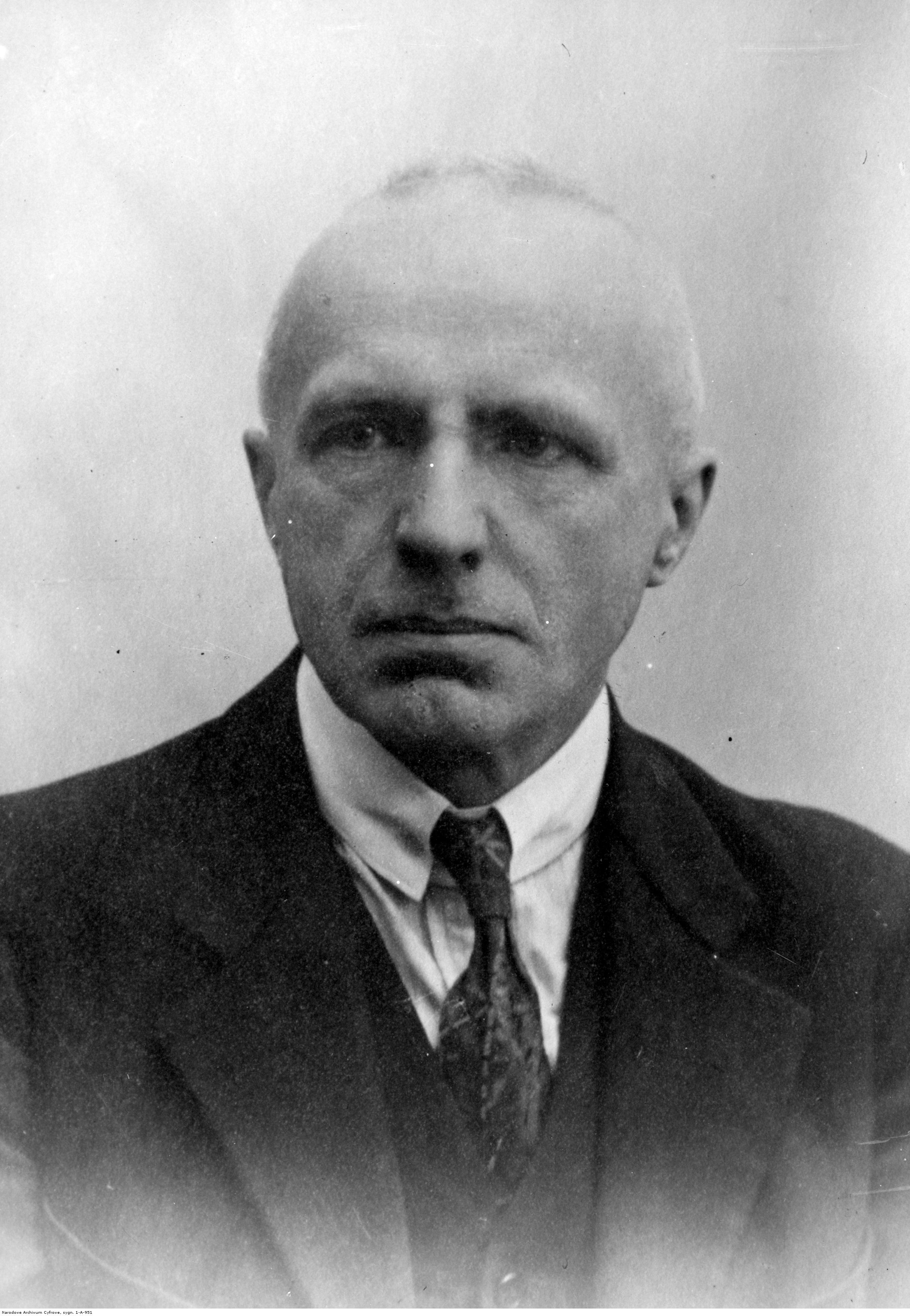
Joachim Bartoszewicz in 1938

Joachim Stefan Bartoszewicz (born September 3, 1867 in Warsaw, died September 23, 1938, Warsaw) - Polish National Party politician, publicist, independence activist, lawyer, doctor. He is the father of the painter Włodzimierz Bartoszewicz.

== Life ==
=== Background and education ===
He was the son of Joachim Bartoszewicz, a physician, and Halina née Mittelstaedt. In 1884, he graduated from the 5th Philological Junior High School in Warsaw. Then, under the influence of his father, he started medical studies at the Faculty of Medicine of the Imperial University of Warsaw, obtaining a doctorate and a medical diploma there (1890). He briefly worked as an assistant in a gynecological and obstetrics clinic in Warsaw. Then, in 1892, he went to Paris to learn new treatment methods. He moved to Paris to further his education, but switched from studying medicine to begin studies at the School of Political Sciences (École Libre des Scienses Politiques) at the Faculty of Diplomacy. In 1894 he obtained his diploma, receiving the first prize and a great distinction (1-er prix et grande distinction). His work titled "La révolution polonaise de 1831 et de détrônement de Nicolaus" ["The Polish revolution of 1831 and the dethroning of Nicholas"] was published in "Annales de l'Ecole de Sciences politiques." He then sought practical work, and so, he studied and graduated in law at the local university in Lviv, then in Austrian Galicia, obtaining a doctorate in both laws in 1897 ("Die Erbschaftsteuer im internationalen Rechte" ["Inheritance Tax in International Law").

=== Socio-political activities ===
Bartoszewicz was an activist in the All-Poland camp prior to World War I. In 1905 he moved to Kiev. In the years 1906–1912, he was the editor-in-chief of the press organ of National Democracy of Poland, "Dziennik Kijowski." From 1906, he also served as the commissioner of the National League in Kiev for the Russian lands. In 1911, he was appointed to the Main Council of the National League. He also took part in the meeting of this organization in 1912 in Pieniaki (Brody Raion) of Tadeusz Cieński. For his political activities, he was imprisoned in 1912 and through disease lost vision in an eye.

=== Activities in newly independent Poland ===
On November 12, 1922, he was elected to the Senate from candidate party list no. 8 from the Lublin Voivodeship (province) on behalf of the Popular National Union (ZLN). On January 14, 1923, he was elected to the Main Board of the ZLN and served on it until 1924. He was active in the Polish Society for the Protection of the Eastern Borderlands. In the association he published 'The Political Importance of the Eastern Borderlands for Poland.' On November 28, 1927, the parliamentary term and Bartoszewicz's work in the Senate ended.

In the 1930 Polish parliamentary election Bartoszewicz headed the National Party and the party achieved the second place position in the election.

=== Death ===
Bartoszewicz died on September 23, 1938 in Warsaw. The cause of death was a heart attack. He is buried at the Powązki Cemetery in Warsaw (plot 284a-1-26/27).
