= Kazimierz Bartoszewicz =

Polish writer and historian

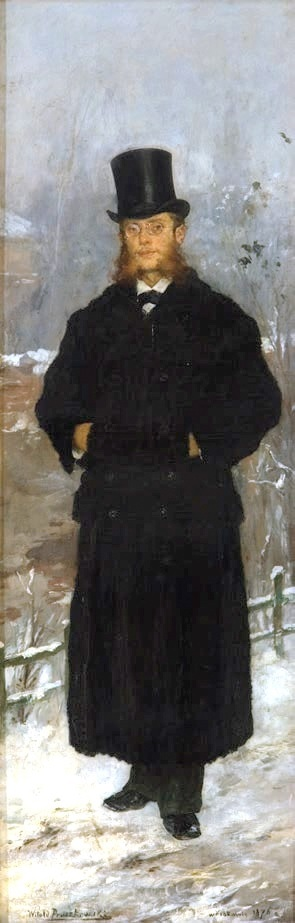
Portrait of Kazimierz Bartoszewicz. Painted by Witold Pruszkowski in 1876.

Kazimierz Bartoszewicz (1852–1930) was a Polish writer and historian. He spent at least part of his life in Kraków.

He was son of Julian Bartoszewicz. In his last will, he donated his collection to the Museum of History and Art in Łódź, which is now named after him.

== Works ==
- Z wesołych chwil, 1876
- Trzy dni w Zakopanem, 1890
- Lukrecjon, 1898
- Dzieje Insurekcji Kościuszkowskiej, 1908
- Dzieje Galicji, 1917

== Quotes ==
Stupidity is sticking on,
Understanding hardly grows itself
to the epidemic disease out.
