= Bodo Hell =

Austrian writer (born 1943)

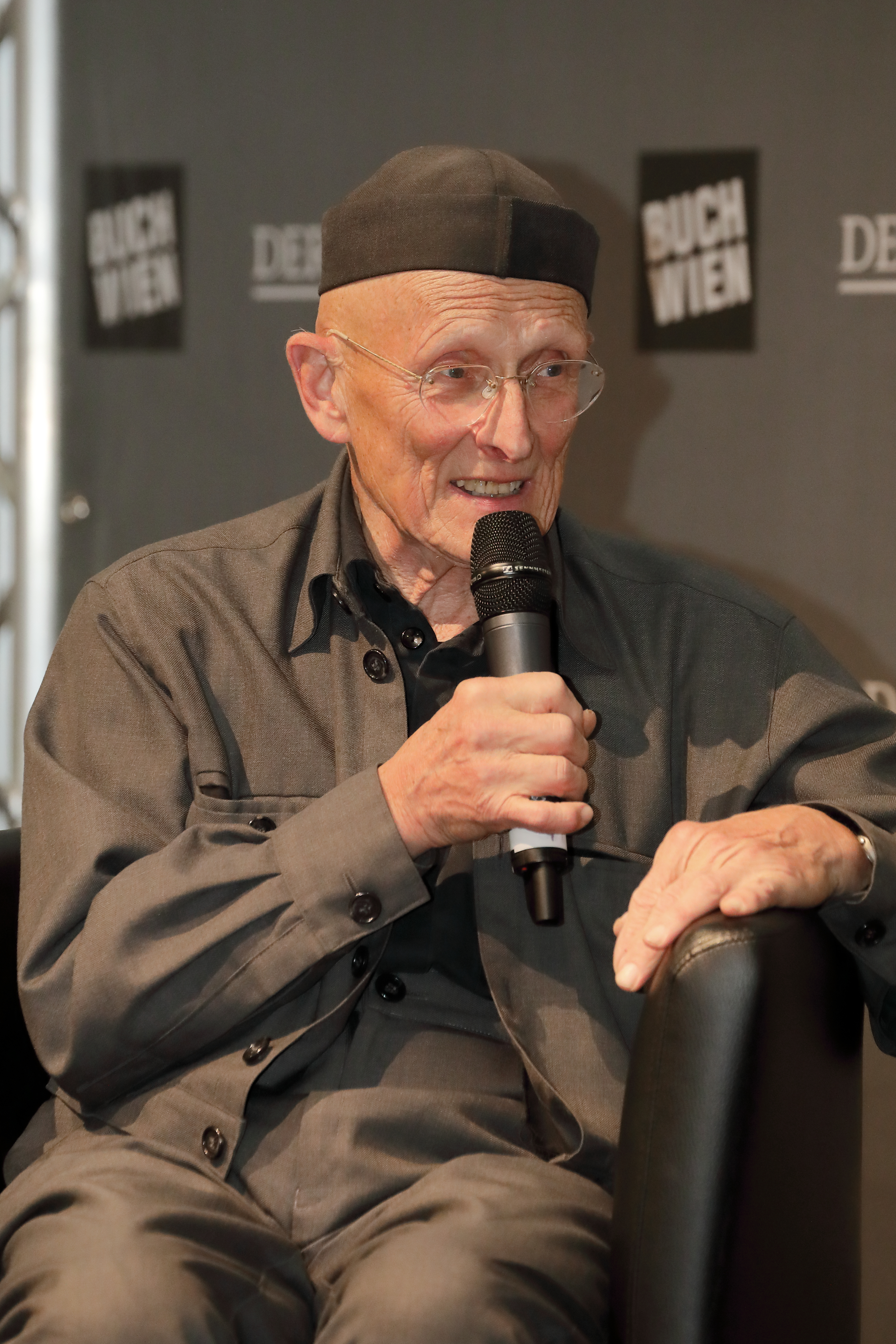
Hell in 2019

Bodo Hell (born 15 March 1943 in Salzburg, missing since 11 August 2024) is an Austrian writer.

== Life ==
He studied the organ at the Mozarteum in Salzburg, and in Vienna he studied film and television, philosophy, German studies and history. He lives in Vienna and Dachstein, Styria. He has worked with, among others, Friederike Mayröcker, Ernst Jandl, Liesl Ujvary and Hil de Gard.

=== Disappearance ===
Bodo Hell used to spend summers guarding sheep in the Austrian mountains. The 81 year old was reported as missing on 11 August 2024. A large search operation for him was abandoned three days later without result. In September 2024, he was officially declared a missing person.

== See also ==
- List of people who disappeared mysteriously (2000–present)
