= Bartosz Fabiniak =

Polish retired footballer

Personal information
- Full name: Bartosz Fabiniak
- Date of birth: 17 September 1982 (age 44)
- Place of birth: Szczecin, Poland
- Height: 1.97 m (6 ft 5 1/2 in)
- Position: Goalkeeper

Senior career*
Years	Team	Apps	(Gls)
2002	Energetyk Gryfino		
2002–2003	Arkonia Szczecin		
2004–2005	Pogoń Szczecin	8	(0)
2006–2010	Widzew Łódź	63	(0)
2011–2013	Pogoń Szczecin	14	(0)
2013–2016	Olimpia Grudziądz	57	(0)
2019–2020	Blau-Weiß Ramsloh		
2020–2021	SV Altenoythe		
- * Club domestic league appearances and goals

Bartosz Fabiniak (Polish pronunciation: [ˈbar.tɔʂ fa.ˈbi.ɲak]; born 17 September 1982) is a Polish former professional footballer who played as a goalkeeper.

== Career ==
Fabiniak has successfully made it through the ranks of the Polish league system having started way down in the fourth tier. In January 2011, he joined Pogoń Szczecin on 2 1/2-year contract.

== Honours ==
Widzew Łódź

- II liga: 2005–06, 2008–09
