= Bartosz Papka =

Polish footballer (born 1993)

Personal information
- Full name: Bartosz Papka
- Date of birth: 12 September 1993 (age 33)
- Place of birth: Jędrzejów, Poland
- Height: 1.80 m (5 ft 11 in)
- Position: Attacking midfielder

Team information
- Current team: Naprzód Jędrzejów
- Number: 7

Youth career
- Korona Kielce
- 2007–2009: GKS Nowiny
- 2009–2010: Rodzina Kielce
- 2010–2013: Korona Kielce

Senior career*
Years	Team	Apps	(Gls)
2011–2014	Korona Kielce	4	(0)
2013	→ Stomil Olsztyn (loan)	12	(0)
2014–2016	Stal Mielec	24	(0)
2014–2015	→ Wierna Małogoszcz (loan)	25	(1)
2016–2017	Spartakus Daleszyce	38	(2)
2018–2024	GKS Nowiny	154	(92)
2024–	Naprzód Jędrzejów	63	(20)
- * Club domestic league appearances and goals as of 10:05, 4 June 2026 (UTC)

Bartosz Papka (born 12 September 1993) is a Polish footballer who plays as an attacking midfielder for III liga club Naprzód Jędrzejów.
