= Bodo Spranz =

German ethnologist (1920–2007)

- Born: 1 January 1920; Nordhausen, Germany
- Died: 1 September 2007 (aged 87); Bremen, Germany
- Awards: Knight's Cross of the Iron Cross with Oak Leaves

Academic work
- Main interests: Preclassic meso-American history

Bodo Spranz (1 January 1920 – 1 September 2007) was a German researcher of preclassic meso-American history and director of the ethnological museum in Freiburg. During World War II he was a hauptmann in the Wehrmacht of Nazi Germany receiving the Knight's Cross of the Iron Cross with Oak Leaves.

From 1947 to 1950 Spranz attended the Art Academy in Bremen and in 1951 was hired as a technical assistant at the Übersee-Museum Bremen (Ethnological Museum in Bremen). With the approval of the Bremen Senate he could study ethnology, folklore and history at the University of Hamburg, without neglecting his museum duties. Professor Franz Termer supervised him in pre-Columbian America and presented him a dissertation topic in this direction. In 1958 he received his doctorate in Hamburg with the thesis "The Codex Borgia; studies the iconography of a Mexican picture manuscript in the Vatican Library in Rome." After graduation, he remained at the Bremen Ethnological Museum. On 1 June 1962 he became the full-time director of the ethnological museum in Freiburg. He qualified in 1969 with a publication "The Pyramids of Totimehuacan/Puebla (Mexico) and their integration into the development of the Preclassic pyramid building in Mesoamerica" and received the Habilitation Ethnology. He held the position of director until 1984.

== World War II awards ==
- Iron Cross (1939) 2nd Class (23 June 1940) 1st Class (2 July 1941)
- General Assault Badge (6 February 1941)
- 4 Tank Destruction Badges for Individual Combatants (27 August 1942)
- German Cross in Gold on 6 May 1943 as Leutnant in the 2./Sturmgeschütz-Abteilung 185
- Knight's Cross of the Iron Cross with Oak Leaves
  - Knight's Cross on 3 October 1943 as Oberleutnant and chief of the 1./Sturmgeschütz-Abteilung 237
  - 308th Oak Leaves on 3 October 1943 as Oberleutnant and chief of the 1./Sturmgeschütz-Abteilung 237
