= Bartosz Kaśnikowski =

Polish footballer

Personal information
- Full name: Bartosz Kaśnikowski
- Date of birth: 31 July 1989 (age 37)
- Place of birth: Białystok, Poland
- Height: 1.86 m (6 ft 1 in)
- Position: Defender

Youth career
- 2003–2005: Hetman Białystok

Senior career*
Years	Team	Apps	(Gls)
2005–2006	Hetman Białystok		
2006–2007	Legia Warsaw II		
2007	Jagiellonia Białystok (ME)	6	(0)
2008	Hetman Białystok		
2008–2010	Śląsk Wrocław (ME)	42	(3)
2009–2010	Śląsk Wrocław	1	(0)
2010	Sokół Sokółka	7	(1)
2011–2012	Chojniczanka Chojnice	22	(1)
2013	Start Otwock	9	(0)
2015	Wisła Jabłonna	5	(0)
- * Club domestic league appearances and goals

Bartosz Kaśnikowski (born 31 July 1989) is a Polish former professional footballer who played as a defender.

== Career ==
Kaśnikowski made his Ekstraklasa debut on 27 September 2009.

In September 2010, he joined Sokół Sokółka.

In January 2011, he moved to Chojniczanka Chojnice on a one-and-a-half-year contract.
