= Bartosz Dzierżanowski =

Polish volleyball player

Personal information
- Nationality: (Poland) Polish
- Born: September 5, 1986 (age 40)
- Height: 6 ft 5 in (1.96 m)
- Weight: 198 lb (90 kg)
- Spike: 136 in (345 cm)
- Block: 128 in (325 cm)

Volleyball information
- Position: Middle blocker
- Current club: (Poland) TKS Tychy

Career
Years	Teams
2005–2013; 2013–2017; 2017–2018; 2018–	(Poland) MKS Będzin (Poland) Aluron Virtu Warta Zawiercie (Poland) MCKiS Jaworzno (Poland) TKS Tychy

Bartosz Dzierżanowski (born September 5, 1986) is a Polish volleyball player. Since the 2018/2019 season, he has played for TKS Tychy

== Sporting achievements ==
=== Clubs ===
Polish First League Championship:

- 2017
- 2012
