= Bartok (surname) =

Bartok or Bartók is a surname. Notable people with the surname include:

- Béla Bartók (1881–1945), Hungarian composer
- Eva Bartok (1927–1998), Hungarian actress

Fictional characters:

- Anton Bartok, character in the film The Fly II
- Janos Bartok, character in the science fiction Western TV series Legend
- Bartok, character in the film Last Knights
- Josef Bartok, character in a 2021 film adaptation of The Royal Game
