= Jan Sovák =

Czech paleoartist and painter (1953–2025)

- Born: 13 February 1953; Tábor, Czechoslovakia
- Died: 14 April 2025 (aged 72)
- Occupation: Artist
- Known for: Paleoart
- Website: www.jansovakart.com/en/

Jan Sovák (13 February 1953 – 14 April 2025) was a Czech paleoartist and painter. He illustrated more than 300 books and created many paintings for scientists including paleontologist Phil Currie and dinosaur writer Don "Dino" Lessem. His sculptures and paintings are prominently featured at the Natural History Museum in Prague. Many of his paintings depict dinosaurs and other prehistoric life.

== Life and career ==
Sovák was born in Tábor in the former Czechoslovakia, and was inspired from an early age by the Czech palaeoartist Zdeněk Burian. He moved to Canada in 1982, returning to live in the Czech Republic in 2017 and was living in Příbram at the time of his death. His work has been published in publications written in more than fifteen languages. More than forty museums around the world house examples of his art on prehistoric animals, and his illustrations have also appeared on educational television, including in twelve films on the Discovery Channel.

During his paleoart career, he collaborated also with numerous Czech paleontologists and writers, such as Zdeněk Špinar and Vladimír Socha.

== Death ==
Sovák died on 14 April 2025, at the age of 72.

== Illustrations ==
Sovák created illustrations for other people's books, such as:

- The flying dinosaurs: the illustrated guide to the evolution of flight by Philip J. Currie (1991), published by Red Deer Press.
- Great Dinosaurs: From Triassic Through Jurassic to Cretaceous by Philip J. Currie and V.Z. Spinar (1994), published by Borders Press.
- The Newest and Coolest Dinosaurs by Philip J. Currie and C.O. Mastin (1998), published by Grasshopper Books.
- A Moment in Time with Troodon by Philip J. Currie and E.P. Felber (2001), published by Fitzhenry & Whiteside. ISBN 9780968251201
- A Moment in Time with Sinosauropteryx by Philip J. Currie and E.B. Koppelhus (2001), published by Fitzhenry & Whiteside. ISBN 9780968251232
- A Moment in Time with Albertosaurus by Philip J. Currie and E.P. Felber (2001), published by Troodon Productions.
- A Moment in Time with Centrosaurus by Philip J. Currie and E.B. Koppelhus (2001), published by Fitzhenry & Whiteside. ISBN 9780968251225
- The Great Dinosaurs: A Study of the Giants' Evolution by Philip J. Currie and Z.V. Špinar and V.S. Spinar V.S. (2004), published by Caxton Editions. ISBN 9781857781076
- Fascinující dinosauři by Vladimír Socha (2025), published by Dobrovský. ISBN 9788027722334
