= Bartłomiej Burman =

Polish footballer (born 2001)

Personal information
- Full name: Bartłomiej Burman
- Date of birth: 1 May 2001 (age 25)
- Place of birth: Poznań, Poland
- Height: 1.84 m (6 ft 0 in)
- Position: Defender

Team information
- Current team: Lech Poznań U13 (assistant)

Youth career
- –2018: Lech Poznań

Senior career*
| Years | Team | Apps | (Gls) |
| 2018–2020 | Lech Poznań II | 2 | (0) |
| 2020–2021 | Nielba Wągrowiec | 17 | (3) |
| 2021–2023 | Warta Poznań | 6 | (0) |
| 2022–2023 | → Skra Częstochowa (loan) | 13 | (0) |
| Total | | 38 | (3) |
- * Club domestic league appearances and goals

Bartłomiej Burman (born 1 May 2001) is a Polish former professional footballer who played as a defender. He is currently the assistant coach of Lech Poznań's under-13 side.

== Career ==
On 15 January 2021, Burman signed a one-and-a-half-year contract, with an option for another two years, with Ekstraklasa side Warta Poznań.

On 7 January 2022, he was loaned to I liga side Skra Częstochowa until the end of the season.

His only appearance in the 2022–23 season came on 22 July 2022, when he entered the pitch in the 77th minute of a 2–0 home win against Chojniczanka Chojnice. Shortly after, Burman was diagnosed with a genetic heart problem. Following medical consultations, he was advised to stop competing on a professional level. He announced his retirement on 12 January 2023.

== Post-retirement ==
Shortly after ending his playing career, Burman began work as a barber. In mid-2023, he joined Lech Poznań's academy as a youth coach.

== Career statistics ==
Appearances and goals by club, season and competition
| Club | Season | League | | | Polish Cup | | Total | |
| Club | Season | Division | Apps | Goals | Apps | Goals | Apps | Goals |
|---|---|---|---|---|---|---|---|---|
| Lech Poznań II | 2017–18 | III liga, gr. II | 1 | 0 | — | | 1 | 0 |
| Lech Poznań II | 2019–20 | II liga | 1 | 0 | — | | 1 | 0 |
| Lech Poznań II | Total | | 2 | 0 | — | | 2 | 0 |
| Nielba Wągrowiec | 2019–20 | III liga, gr. II | 1 | 0 | — | | 1 | 0 |
| Nielba Wągrowiec | 2020–21 | III liga, gr. II | 16 | 3 | — | | 16 | 3 |
| Nielba Wągrowiec | Total | | 17 | 3 | — | | 17 | 3 |
| Warta Poznań | 2020–21 | Ekstraklasa | 4 | 0 | — | | 4 | 0 |
| Warta Poznań | 2021–22 | Ekstraklasa | 2 | 0 | 1 | 0 | 3 | 0 |
| Warta Poznań | Total | | 6 | 0 | 1 | 0 | 7 | 0 |
| Skra Częstochowa (loan) | 2021–22 | I liga | 12 | 0 | — | | 12 | 0 |
| Skra Częstochowa (loan) | 2022–23 | I liga | 1 | 0 | 0 | 0 | 1 | 0 |
| Skra Częstochowa (loan) | Total | | 13 | 0 | 0 | 0 | 13 | 0 |
| Career total | | | 38 | 3 | 1 | 0 | 39 | 3 |
