= Włodzimierz Bartoszewicz =

Polish painter

Włodzimierz Bartoszewicz (3 July 1899 – 8 August 1983) was a Polish painter. He was born in Lviv, and he was the son of the Polish politician Joachim Bartoszewicz. His work was part of the painting event in the art competition at the 1936 Summer Olympics.
