= Bartłomiej Groicki =

Polish jurist

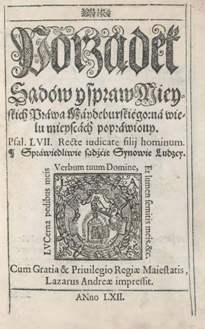
Cover of "Porządek sądów y spraw Mieyskich Prawa Maydeburskiego" by Bartłomiej Groicki, from 1562

Bartłomiej Groicki (c. 1534–1605) was a Polish jurist.

After studies in Kraków in 1550–1558, he became clerk of the Supreme Court of German Law at Kraków Castle (Ius supremum Magdeburgense castri Cracoviensis). He gained renown for his instructive treatises of Polish municipal law. By publishing a Polish language summary of the 1532 Constitutio Criminalis Carolina, he contributed substantially to its popularization in Poland. His stated motivation for the extensive translation of laws into vernacular Polish was so that the laws could be applied even in smaller towns and urban areas where it might be difficult to find Latin speakers.

Groicki authored the first printed law book in Poland, a treatise on the text Speculum Saxonum, which was published by the print-shop of Łazarz Andrysowicz.
