= Bartosz Borowski =

Polish activist (1978-2010)

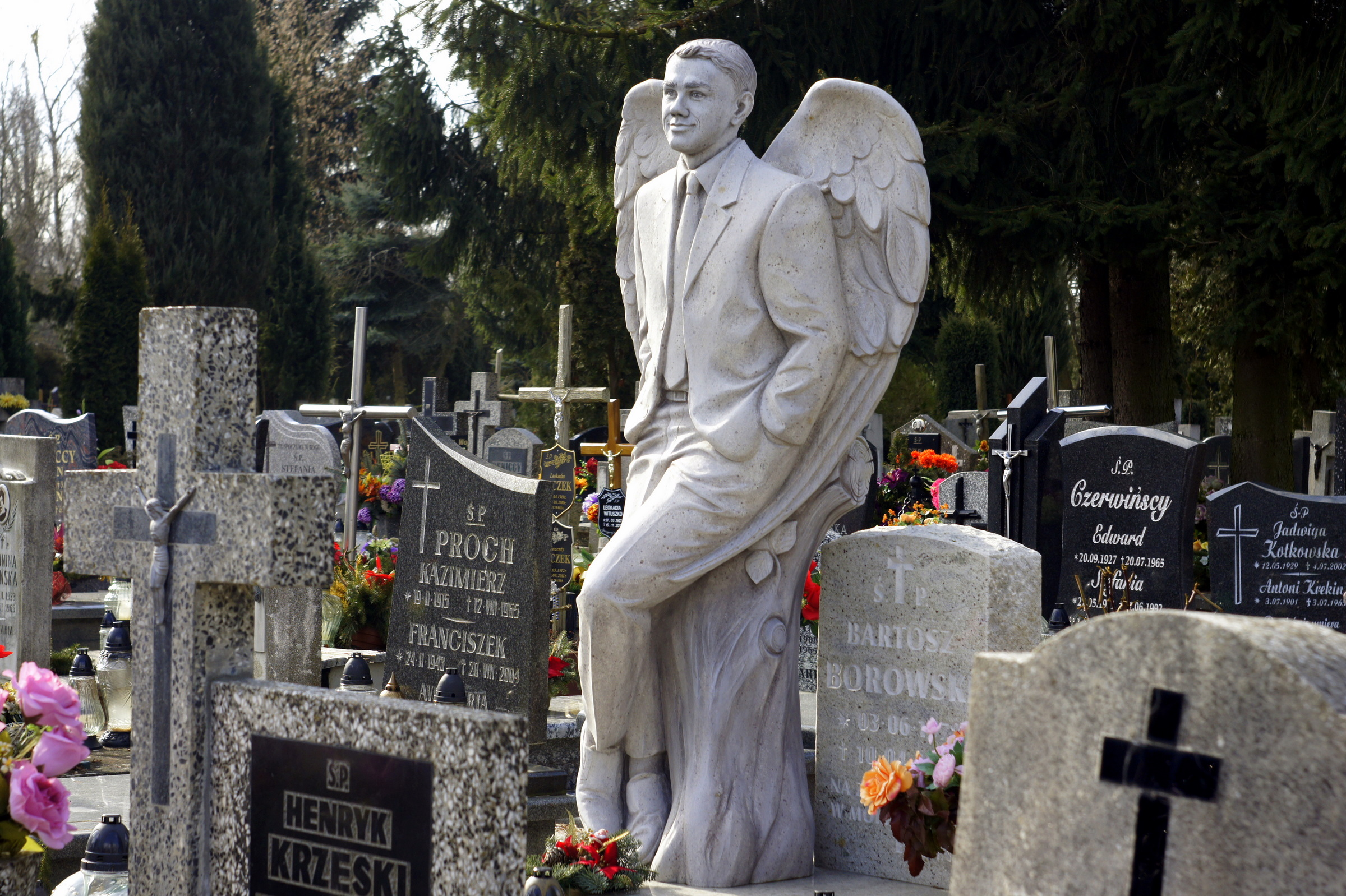
Bartosz Borowski

Bartosz Borowski (3 June 1978 – 10 April 2010) was a Polish activist and representative of the Katyn Families.

He died in the 2010 Polish Air Force Tu-154 crash near Smolensk on 10 April 2010. He was posthumously awarded the Order of Polonia Restituta.

== Awards ==
- Knight's Cross of the Order of Polonia Restituta (2010)
