= Bodo Abel =

German Professor

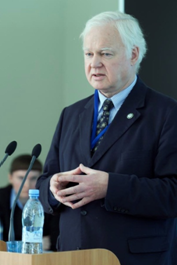
- Born: January 18, 1948 (age 78)
- Education: University of Mannheim Business Administration
- Awards: „Doctor Honoris Causa” by the St. Petersburg State University of Economics and Finance in 2005, elected member of “International Higher Education Academy of Sciences” (Russia) in 2001
- Scientific career
- Fields: International marketing
- Institutions: University of Hamburg

Bodo Abel (born January 18, 1948) is a German Professor at the University of Hamburg specializing in Business Administration, with a focus on International Marketing. Up to 2013, he was the program director of the international master program 'MiBA – Master of International Business Administration' at the University of Hamburg and at the St. Petersburg State University of Economics and Finance (FINEC), Russia. His teaching and research fields are International Marketing, International Media-Management, International Business Ethics, International Corporate Social Responsibility and Studies of Methods in Business Administration.

== Life and career ==
Bodo Abel studied Business Administration at the University of Mannheim from the years 1968 to 1973. During this time, he met the professor in marketing, Hans Raffée, and critical rationalist Hans Albert, who was the chair of 'Social Sciences and General Studies of Methods' in the university. He led Bodo Abel’s interests on the general studies of method and critical rationalism. In his doctoral dissertation, Bodo Abel wrote about the "Foundations of Explaining Human Behavior". After his doctoral dissertation and his employment as assistant professor at the marketing chair of Hans Raffée at the University, he moved into the management of the publishing house Gruner+Jahr AG & Co. in 1982. By 1994, he went back to the University of Hamburg and became a first professor for marketing at the “University of Applied Science in Hamburg.” One year later, he served as a professor at the Hamburg University for Economy and Politics (HWP) (since 2005 faculty of the University of Hamburg). In 1998 he founded the international master program, 'MiBA – Master of International Business Administration' under his leadership from 2005. The MiBA is also offered at the St. Petersburg State University of Economics and Finance (FINEC), Russia, as a double degree program.

== Scientific contributions ==
As a university professor Bodo Abel gave lectures at several international universities on:

- „Media Marketing“ (at University of Hanover, University of Hamburg and St. Petersburg State University of Economics and Finance (FINEC), Russia),
- „International Marketing“ (University of Hamburg, St. Petersburg State University of Economics and Finance (FINEC), Russia, East China University of Science and Technology, Shanghai, and Nanjing University, Nanjing, China),
- „International Business Ethics“ and „Corporate Social Responsibility“ (University of Hamburg and St. Petersburg State University of Economics and Finance (FINEC), Russia)
- „International-Case-Study-Seminars with real-time cases out of the international management, with teams of students from several international universities (participants were MiBA students of the University of Hamburg and St. Petersburg State University of Economics and Finance (FINEC), Russia, and the East China University of Science and Technology, Shanghai).

In his books and articles Bodo Abel was first focused on studies of scientific methods in business administration and later he published articles on marketing, ethics and branding in a broader understanding of marketing management. Marketing management has not only a profit orientation but it is also useful for social and societal issues (socio-marketing and city-branding).

== Works ==
=== Books ===
1. Grundlagen der Erklärung in der Betriebswirtschaftslehre. Überlegungen zu einer Kontroverse zwischen Konstruktivisten und Kritischen Rationalisten,
  Diss., Mannheim 1981
2. Wissenschaftstheoretische Grundfragen der Wirtschaftswissenschaften,
  Verlag Vahlen, 1979, Editor together with Prof. Dr. Hans Raffée (also published in Japanese: Zeimu-Keiri-Kyokai-Publishing House, Tokio 1982)
3. Grundlagen der Erklärung menschlichen Handelns,
  Verlag J. C. B. Mohr (Paul Siebeck), 1983 (in: "Die Einheit der Gesellschaftswissenschaften")
4. Management mit Vision und Verantwortung. Eine Herausforderung an Wissenschaft und Praxis,
  (Editor with Klaus-Peter Wiedmann and Wolfgang Fritz), Gabler-Verlag, 2004

=== Articles ===
1. Plädoyer für eine aufklärungs- und gestaltungsorientierte Marketing-Wissenschaft,
  in: Fischer-Winkelmann, W. F./ Rock, R. (Ed.), Marketing und Gesellschaft, Gabler-Verlag, 1977, pages 9 – 41
2. Betriebswirtschaftslehre und praktische Vernunft,
  in: Steinmann, H. (Hrsg.), Betriebswirtschaftslehre als normative Handlungswissenschaft, Gabler-Verlag, 1978, pages 160 - 191
3. Denken in theoretischen Modellen als Leitidee der Wirtschaftswissenschaften,
  in: Raffée, H. / Abel, B. (Ed.), Wissenschaftstheoretische Grundfragen der Wirtschaftswissenschaften, Verlag Vahlen, 1979, pages 138 -160
4. Kritischer Rationalismus und das Wertfreiheitsprinzip,
  in: Raffée, H. / Abel, B. (Ed.), Wissenschaftstheoretische Grundfragen der Wirtschaftswissenschaften, Verlag Vahlen, 1979, pages 215 - 234
5. Aufgaben und aktuelle Tendenzen der Wissenschaftstheorie in den Wirtschaftswissenschaften (with Prof. Dr. Hans Raffée)
  in: Raffée, H. / Abel, B. (Ed.), Wissenschaftstheoretische Grundfragen der Wirtschaftswissenschaften, Verlag Vahlen, 1979, pages 1 – 10
6. Machttheoretische Modelle und Individualismus als Ansatzpunkte der unternehmensbezogenen Konfliktforschung,
  in: Dlugos, G. (Ed.), Unternehmensbezogene Konfliktforschung, C. E. Poeschel Verlag, 1979, pages 45 – 69
7. Sozio-Marketing
  (with Prof. Dr. Hans Raffée and Peter Wiedmann), in: Irle, M. (Ed.), Handbuch der Psychologie, Band 12: Methoden und Anwendungen in der Marktpsychologie, Verlag Hogrefe, 1983, pages 675 - 768
8. Ein eigenständiges kulturwissenschaftliches Fachverständnis in der Betriebswirtschaftslehre: Muss das sein?
  in: Fischer-Winkelmann, W. F. (Ed.), Paradigmawechsel in der Betriebswirtschaftslehre?, Verlag René F. Wilfer, 1983, pages 3 – 30
9. Funktionen der Wissenschaftstheorie in den Wirtschaftswissenschaften,
  in: Hummel, T. R. (Ed.), Das Studium der Wirtschaftswissenschaften, Campus Verlag, 1984, pages 159 - 179
10. Gesellschaftlich Engagierte. Promotoren des Wandels, Kernzielgruppe des gesellschaftsbezogenen Marketing,
  in: Meffert, H. / Wagner, H. (Ed.), Wertewandel und Konsumentenverhalten, Arbeitspapier Nr. 20, Wissenschaftliche Gesellschaft für Marketing und Unternehmensführung e. V., Münster 1984, pages 39 – 66
11. Konstruktivismus,
  in: Dichtl, E. / Issing, O. (Ed.), Vahlens großes Wirtschaftslexikon, Band 1, Verlag C. H. Beck, Verlag Vahlen, 1987, pages 1055 f.
12. Kulturwissenschaft,
  in: Dichtl, E. / Issing, O. (Ed.), Vahlens großes Wirtschaftslexikon, Band 1, Verlag C. H. Beck, Verlag Vahlen, 1987, pages 1116 f.
13. Transsubjektivitätsprinzip,
  in: Dichtl, E. / Issing, O. (Ed.), Vahlens großes Wirtschaftslexikon, Band 1, Verlag C. H. Beck, Verlag Vahlen, 1987, pages 722 f.
14. Management Science as a Cultural Science?,
  in: Kojima, S, Schanz, G. (Ed.) Economics and Critical Rationalism. Scientific Exchange between Germany and Japan, Tokio 1987, pages 52 – 68 (in Japanese)
15. Marketingethik - Ausgangspunkte, Hemmnisse und Folgerungen,
  in: Die Betriebswirtschaft DBW, 48. Jahrgang 1988, pages 803 - 806
16. Ethik, Markt und Medien,
  in: Silberer, G. / Specht, G. / Engelhardt, H. (Ed.), Marketing-Schnittstellen, C. E. Poeschel Verlag, 1989, pages 69 – 83
17. Dialog und Ethik - Eine nicht-dialogische Methode zur ethischen Beurteilung des Dialogs,
  in: Hansen, U. (Ed.), Marketing im gesellschaftlichen Dialog, Campus Verlag, 1996, pages 93 – 108
18. Grundlegende Herausforderungen im E-Branding,
  in: Riekhof, H.-C.(Ed.), E-branding-Strategien in der Praxis, Gabler Verlag, 2001, pages 31 – 55
19. Menedschment SMI meschdurinkom, politikoj i svobodojpechati
  in: Region 4/2001, St. Petersburg, Russland 2001, pages 120 – 125,
20. Medienmanagement: Market, Politicsand freedom of the Press,
  in: Bagiev, G. (Ed.) Relations between Russia and the European Union in the times of Globalisation, pages 142 – 151 (in Russian)
21. Kosmopolitismus – die nächste “große Idee”? Über Ulrich Becks Buch “Macht und Gegenmacht im globalen Zeitalter”,
  in: Personalführung, January 2003, pages 78 f.
22. The basic challenges of globalization in research and higher education of International Business Administration,
  in: Report of the AFBE-Conference in Shanghai, May 2004,
23. Ethisch-normative Analysen in den Wirtschaftswissenschaften - möglich und sinnvoll
  in: Klaus-Peter Wiedmann / Wolfgang Fritz / Bodo Abel (Ed.): Management mit Vision und Verantwortung. Eine Herausforderung an Wissenschaft und Praxis, Gabler Verlag, 2004, pages 285 – 307
24. Grundlegende Herausforderungen der Globalisierung an die Erforschung und Ausbildung des internationalen Managements an Universitäten,
  in: Bagiev, G. (Ed.) Europäische Ausbildung, Band 1, St. Petersburg 2006, pages 103 - 108
25. Corporate Social Responsibility im Journalismus und im Medienmanagement - ein Überblick,
  CIS-Paper zum Workshop „Corporate SocialResponsibility in Medienunternehmen - Chancen und Herausforderungen unternehmensethischer Ansätze, 20. June 2007
26. Eine internationale Hochschulkooperation entlang der Partnerschaftsachse Hamburg - St. Petersburg - Shanghai - Warum brauchen wir internationale Studienprogramme?
  in ChinaContact, October 2007, pages 24 - 26
27. Vielfalt und Wettbewerb als Basis der Konkurrenzfähigkeit unserer Universitäten,
  in: Book on Anniversary of International Higher Education Academy of Science (IHEAS), Moscow 2007 (in German and Russian Language), pages 158 - 170
28. St. Petersburg – Markenpolitik einer Stadt,
  in: Georgyi Bagiev, Heribert Meffert (Ed.): Relationship Marketing, St. Petersburg 2009, pages 437 – 444 (in Russian)

== Award and membership ==
- 2005 „Doctor Honoris Causa” by the St. Petersburg State University of Economics and Finance (FINEC)
- 2001 Elected member of “International Higher Education Academy of Sciences” (IHEAS), Russia
- 2003 Vice-President of the German department of “International Higher Education Academy of Sciences” (IHEAS),
