= Johanneskirche =

Roman Catholic church

Coordinates: 47.988945°N 7.847002°E

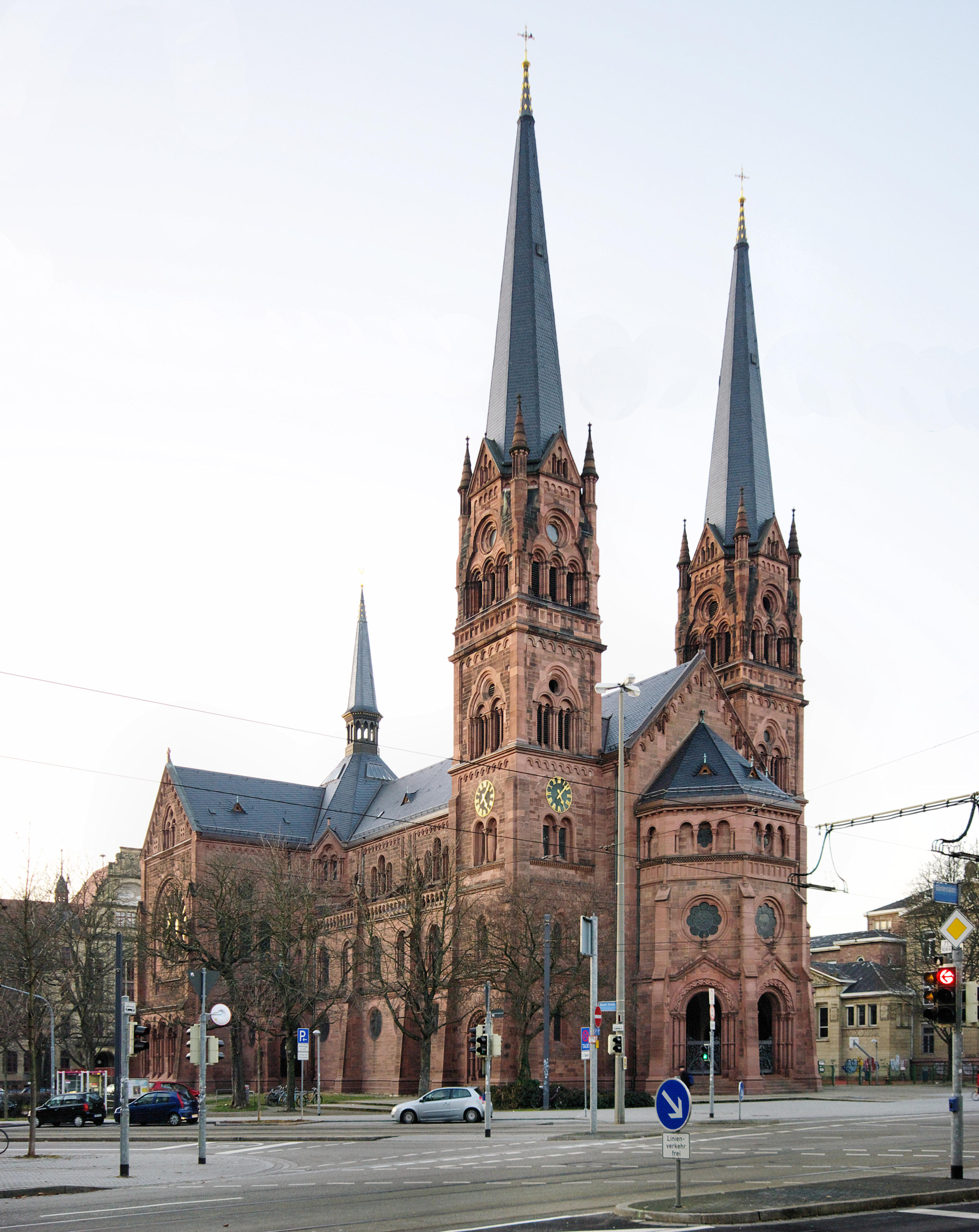
Johanneskirche in Freiburg im Breisgau

The Johanneskirche (Church of St. John) is a Roman Catholic church located in Freiburg im Breisgau. It was first opened in 1899 and is currently located in the Wiehre district. Around the church, further historic buildings were built. On the western side is the presbytery of the community next to a vocational school and to the north is the Lessingschule. At the same time as the Johanneskirche was being completed, the Protestant Christians built their own church near to Johanneskirche, the Christuskirche.

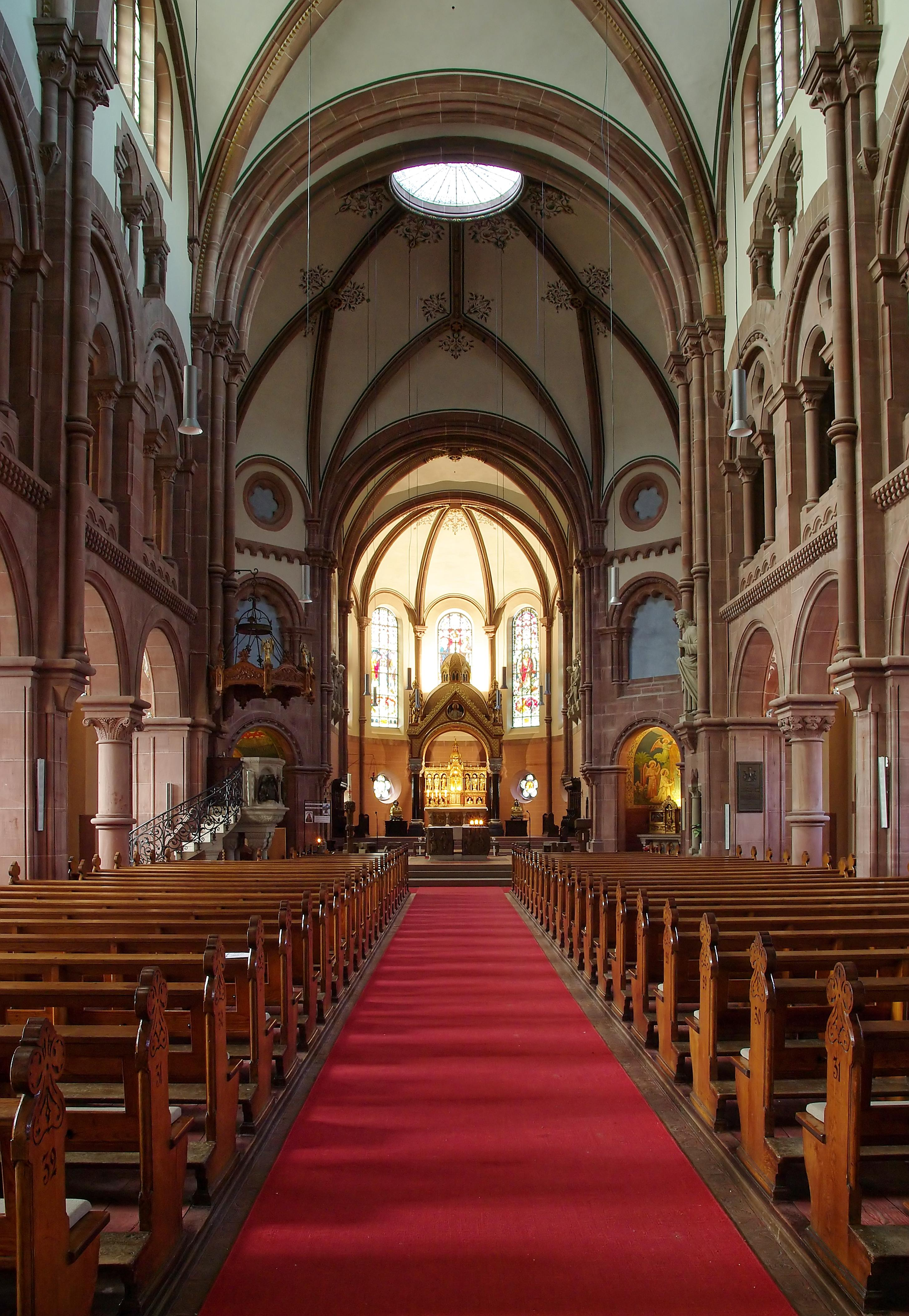
The interior of Johanneskirche

== History ==
After the Wiehre district had joined with Freiburg in 1825, a large construction project took place. The population rapidly grew within a few decades. Since the Church of St. Cyriakus and Perpetua was only designed for less than 200 people, the church was no longer adequate for the rising population figures. This led to a decision being made to build a new church in 1889. The client was the domain directorate, subordinated to the Ministry of Finance of the Grand Duchy of Baden. The contract was given to building manager Josef Durm. The Ministry rejected its draft because of its costs. In order to accommodate the required space on a smaller site, the Ministry of Finance called for galleries. Durm and the church initially rejected this as unsuitable for a Catholic church since the faithful in the gallery could not participate appropriately during mass. Churches with galleries were only considered suitable for Evangelical preaching services. Finally, Durm gave in. The city council was also involved in designing the church. Durm's next draft, in Romanesque-early Gothic style, seemed to be too much in competition with the Minster. Durm then changed his design and emphasised more strongly the Romanesque sections. He designed the towers to be taller and later added them to another storey. Construction served to mark the town-planning guiding principle under Lord Mayor Otto Winterer to mark the expanding of the city of Freiburg by towering buildings.

Construction work on a site near to the Dreisam, on which the first gasworks had stood, began in 1894 and ended when the church was consecrated in 1899. In order to make good use of the existing site for a church with 900 seats, the church was designed with a very wide central nave (11m) and two side aisles (each 3.5m) with galleries. The length of the building is 74.3m. The crossing of the nave and the transept has a diameter of 16.8m.

The building is decorated in red sandstone and resembles the typical features of new Romanesque architecture, which included elements of late Romanesque churches. Unlike older churches, Johanneskirche is not orientated to the east, with the altar located to the west. The facade, whose entrance is shaped in the form of an octagon, is flanked by two towers about 60m high with very steep spires pointing eastwards towards Talstraße, which forms a long line of sight for the church.

Architect Josef Durm, in a letter addressed to the Finance Directorate, described Bamberg Cathedral as a model for the new church, with mainly relates to the exterior view to the east with the entrance apse flanked by two towers. On the other hand, both the floor plan and the interior are clearly different from the aforementioned model. "The architect has found his idols rather in late Romanesque of the Lower and Upper Rhines. (...) Durm arrives (...) at an independent solution so that a direct derivation from a late-Romanesque building is not possible".

The church's glass windows were created by Freiburg artist Fritz Geiges between 1898 and 1901.

After the interior was renovated between 1971 and 1973, crossings with the altar island and celebration made by Joseph Henger were redesigned in 1975. A further exterior renovation (especially the roof, but also damage to the masonry, windows etc.) took place from 2006 to 2008.

== The former Fourteen Holy Helpers' chapel ==
In the Johanneskirche, there is still an old painting depicting the Fourteen Holy Helpers. It originated in the defunct chapel as well as two Baroque figures and a medieval Madonna. These were located on the modern-day Basler Straße, between Heinrich-von-Stephan-Straße and the railway underpass.

== The modern day ==
The community of St. John, alongside the community of St. Cyriak and Perpetua, whose church is also called Annakirche, the Liebfraugemeinde in Günterstal and the Maria-Hilf community in the Upper Wiehre formed the pastoral unit of Freiburg-Süd. The pastoral unit was supervised by Order of Friars Minor from Poland from 2005 to 2013, who were located in the Franciscan monastery at Günterstalstraße.

== Organ ==
The organ on the church's eastern gallery was built in 1981 by organ builder Metzler (Dietikon, Switzerland). The organ has 50 stops (3536 pipes) on three keyboards and pedals. In addition to the main console, the organ also has a figured bass console in the lower section of the positive organ with a pedal attached. Tjos console is independent of the main console so that two organ players can play music on two organ consoles. The organ has mechanical and registered tracker actions.
