= Artur Bartoszewicz =

Polish doctor of economic sciences, an expert in public policy (born 1974)

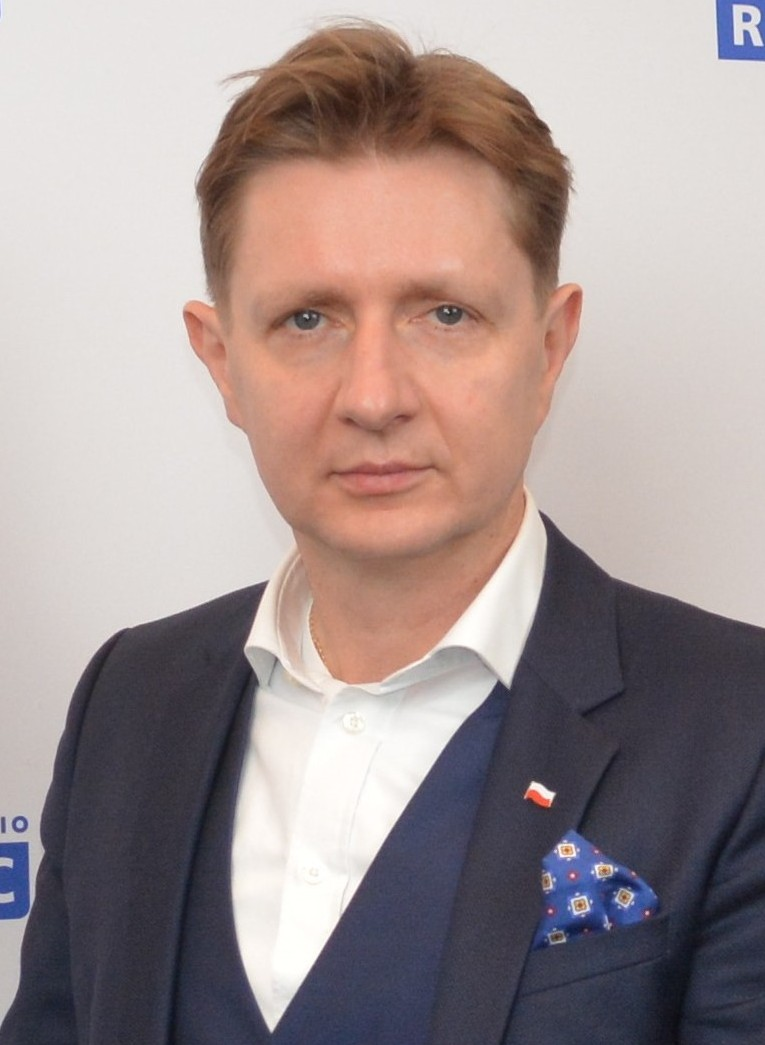
- Bartoszewicz in 2025
- Born: 18 January 1974 (age 52); Suwałki, Poland
- Education: Warsaw School of Economics
- Scientific career
- Fields: Economy, Public Policy
- Workplaces: Warsaw School of Economics

Artur Bartoszewicz (born January 18, 1974) is a Polish doctor of economic sciences, an expert in public policy, a lecturer at the Collegium of Socio-Economics of the Warsaw School of Economics and candidate for the 2025 Polish presidential election.

From 2016 to 2018, he was the President of the National Board of the Polish Association of Experts and Assessors of European Union Funds.

Since 2015, he has been a member of the Program Board of the Polish Platform for Homeland Security. Since 2019, he has been a Chairman of the Program Board of the Institute of New Europe. On October 15, he was appointed to the Board of the National Centre for Research and Development for 2020–2024.

== Early life ==
In 1998, he graduated from the Faculty of Economics at the University of Gdańsk, majoring in international economic relations, with a master's degree in economics. A year later, he completed postgraduate studies in Public Relations at the Faculty of Management and Economics at the Gdańsk University of Technology. At the same time, he was attending a graduate school at the Collegium of Economic Analysis at the Warsaw School of Economics. On November 27, 2012, the Board of the Collegium of Economic Analysis of the Warsaw School of Economics awarded him with a PhD in economic sciences in the field of social sciences, in the faculty of economic sciences in the discipline of economics.

He is an assistant professor at the Warsaw School of Economics, initially at the Department of Development Economics and Economic Policy at the Collegium of Economic Analysis, now at the Department of Public Policy at the Collegium of Socio-Economics. He used to lecture at the Kozminski University, the University of Social Sciences in Warsaw, the Warsaw University of Life Sciences, and the University of Warsaw.

As an expert in the field of public aid, economic analysis and finances, he prepares reports and expert opinions for central and local government administration, including the Ministry of Finance, the Ministry of Infrastructure and Development, and the Ministry of Sport and Tourism.

== Additional activities ==
A member of the Social Team for the Polish Nuclear Power Industry appointed by the Ministry of Economy. A member of the Monitoring Committees for the programs for 2004-2006 and 2007–2013. In the years 2004-2010 he was an expert on European funds at Confederation Lewiatan. He participated in the process of programming EU funds for 2014-2020 and 2021–2027. He was appointed as an expert from the national list of the Minister of Regional Development. An expert on evaluating projects at the Polish Agency for Enterprise Development, Digital Poland Projects Centre, and the National Centre for Research and Development.

He was a candidate for the 2025 Polish presidential election, he got 95,640 votes or 0.49%.

== Selected research papers ==
- Bartoszewicz A, The consequences of the public policy negligence in terms of foreign currency denominated mortgage loans, Public Policy Studies, Warsaw School of Economics, KES, Warsaw 2019.
- Bartoszewicz A., Multilevel public management as an instrument of shaping the development policy in: Elements of contemporary economic policy, collective work, edited by J. Stacewicz, SGH Publishing House. Warsaw School of Economics, ISBN 978-83-8030-211-2, Warsaw 2018.
- Bartoszewicz A., Modern management methods supporting the decision-making process in uniformed services (work in print), National Police Headquarters, Warsaw 2017.
- Bartoszewicz A., Correctness of implementation with the Mortgage Loan Act (...) (Senate Paper No. 433) of the Directive of the European Parliament and the council on consumer credit agreements related to residential real estate. Opinions and Expertise (OE-255), Analyses, Documentation and Correspondence Office, Thematic Analysis and Studies Team, Senate Office, March 2017.
- Bartoszewicz A., Analysis of uncertainty and risk in the area of socioeconomic decisions in the context of economic and socio-cultural security in: Contemporary economic and socio-cultural security. The international dimension, edited by Marta Gębska PhD (ISBN 978-83-7523-588-3), War Studies University, Warsaw 2017.
- Bartoszewicz A., Application of foresight methods in predicting scenarios of events in the area of national and international security in: Forecasting in social sciences. National and international dimension edited by Halina Świeboda PhD (ISBN 978-83-7523-628-6), Academy of Martial Arts in Warsaw, Warsaw 2017.
- Bartoszewicz A., Financial Instruments as a tool for the implementation of EU Cohesion Policy. in: Economic policy perspectives, edited by J. Stacewicz, Works and Materials of the Institute of Economic Development No. 99, SGH, Warsaw 2017.
- Bartoszewicz A. Social impact of the crisis of foreign currency related mortgage loans, Polish Economic Society in Zielona Góra, Journal No. 6, Zielona Góra 2017.
- Bartoszewicz A., Multilevel public management in the European Union in: Economic policy in the conditions of development changes, ed. J. Stacewicz, Works and Materials of the Institute of Economic Development No. 98, SGH, Warsaw 2016.

== Selected reports ==
- Bartoszewicz A., Obłąkowska K., Factors influencing the demand for alcohol in the context of social and economic costs in Poland. Changes in the amount of public levies and the model of the minimum price in relation with alcohol consumption and outflows to the budget, PARPA, Warsaw 2021.
- Bartoszewicz A., Iniewski R., Tobacco and nicotine products in Poland. Proposed changes in the taxation of innovative products, Report of the Jagieliński Institute, Warsaw 2021.
- Bartoszewicz A., Klimkiewicz A., Obłąkowska K., Poland flooded with beer, analysis of the evolution of the alcohol consumption model in Poland - causes and effects. Report, Report of the Jagiellonian Institute, Warsaw 2021.
- Bartoszewicz A., Obłąkowska K., Socio-economic effects of implementing a commercial tax. Assessment of the legitimacy of delaying the implementation / modification of tax solutions addressed to the commercial sector, POHiD, Warsaw 2020.
- Bartoszewicz A., Iniewski R., Tomkiewicz J., Tax on retail sales - economic and legal effects of introducing another solution suppressing the commercial sector, Report of the Jagieliński Institute, Warsaw 2019.
- Bartoszewicz A. Roszkowski M., An alternative proposal of the Jagiellonian Institute regarding the legitimacy of modifying legal solutions in the area of the Sunday trade ban, Report of the Jagiellonian Institute, Warsaw 2018.
