= Vladimír Socha =

RNDr. Vladimír Socha (born 1 January 1982 in Hradec Králové) is a Czech writer, publisher, public lecturer and science promoter from the city Hradec Králové (north-eastern Czech Republic). His Czech academic title is RNDr. – Rerum Naturalium Doctor – "The Doctor of Natural Sciences"). His main interest lies in dinosaur paleontology and the history of science in general. So far, he published about twenty books about dinosaurs and primeval life in Czech, nine smaller brochures (booklets) and hundreds of magazine articles about nature, history and prehistory. In 2009 he volunteered in the summer paleontological field dig in the Hell Creek formation in eastern Montana (for the Museum of the Rockies in Bozeman). A year later, he published a book about the experience called Dinosauři od Pekelného potoka ("Dinosaurs from the Hell Creek"). He also provides interviews for the Czech Radio and Czech Television and sometimes organises paleoart exhibitions.

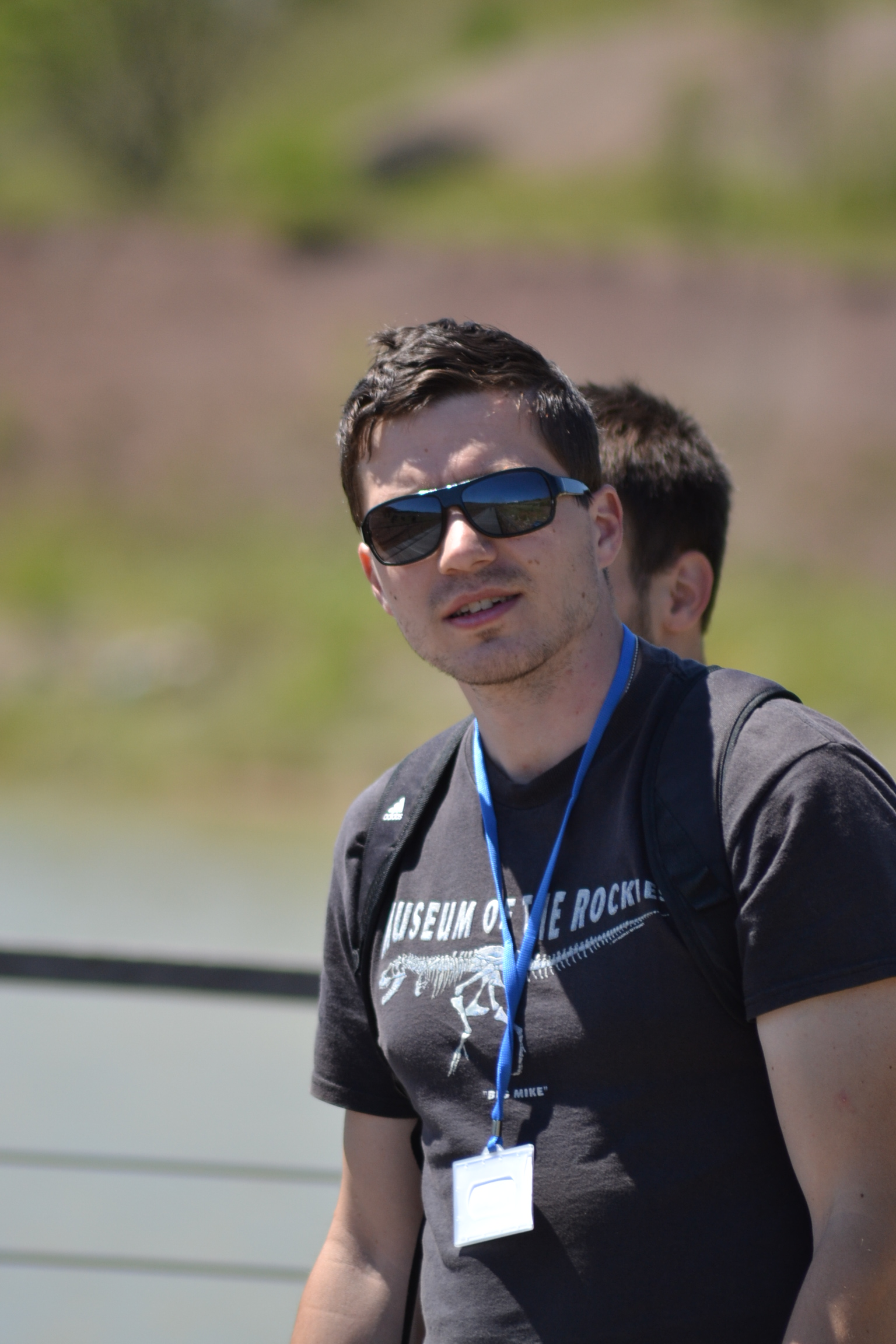
Vladimír Socha in Krasiejów (Poland), 2015.

== Published book titles ==
- Úžasný svět dinosaurů (Magnificent World of Dinosaurs), Triton, 2009 (2nd edition 2012)
- Encyklopedie dinosaurů ve světle nejnovějších objevů (Encyclopedia of Dinosaurs in the Light of new Discoveries), Libri, 2010
- Dinosauři od Pekelného potoka (Dinosaurs from the Hell Creek), Motto, 2010
- Po stopách dinosaurů (In the Footsteps of Dinosaurs), Triton, 2011
- Podivuhodní draci (Strange Dragons, brochure), Triton, 2013
- Objevy pod vrstvami času (Discoveries under the Layers of Time), Computer Press, 2014
- Pravěk v českých zemích (Prehistory of the Czech Lands, brochure), Triton, 2015
- Pravěcí vládci oblohy (Prehistoric Rulers of the Skies, brochure), Triton, 2015
- Neznámí dinosauři (Unknown Dinosaurs), Mladá fronta, 2015
- Poslední dny dinosaurů (The Last Days of Dinosaurs), Radioservis, 2016
- Dinosauří rekordmani (Dinosaur Record Holders, brochure), Triton, 2016
- Dinosauři v Čechách (Dinosaurs in the Czech Republic), Vyšehrad, 2017
- Výlet do vesmíru (A Trip to the Universe), Triton, 2017
- Velké vymírání na konci křídy ("The Great Extinction at the end of the Cretaceous"), Pavel Mervart, 2017
- Poslední den druhohor (The Last Day of the Mesozoic), Vyšehrad, 2018
- Nová cesta do pravěku (New journey to prehistory), CPress, 2019
- Legenda jménem Tyrannosaurus rex (A legend named Tyrannosaurus rex), Pavel Mervart, 2019
- Dinosauři (Dinosaurs) (small book/booklet), Bylo nebylo, 2019
- Monstra pravěkých moří (Monsters of the primeval seas, brochure), Triton, 2019
- Pravěcí vládci Evropy ("Prehistoric rulers of Europe"), Kazda, 2020
- Dinosauři – rekordy a zajímavosti (Dinosaurs – Records and Curiosities), Kazda 2021
- Největší dinosauří záhady (Greatest Dinosaur Mysteries), Euromedia Group, 2022
- Dinosauři (Dinosaurs), Czech News Center, 2022
- Obři pravěku (Giants of the Prehistory, brochure), Triton, 2023
- Dinosauří mláďata (Dinosaur babies, brochure), Triton, 2024
- Průvodce světem dinosaurů (Field Guide to the World of Dinosaurs, audiobook), Supraphon, 2024
- Návrat dinosaurů (The Return of Dinosaurs), Grada, 2025
- Fascinující dinosauři (Fascinating Dinosaurs), illustrated by Jan Sovák, Dobrovský, 2025
- Bylo nebylo v druhohorách (Once upon a time in the Mesozoic), Pikola, 2026

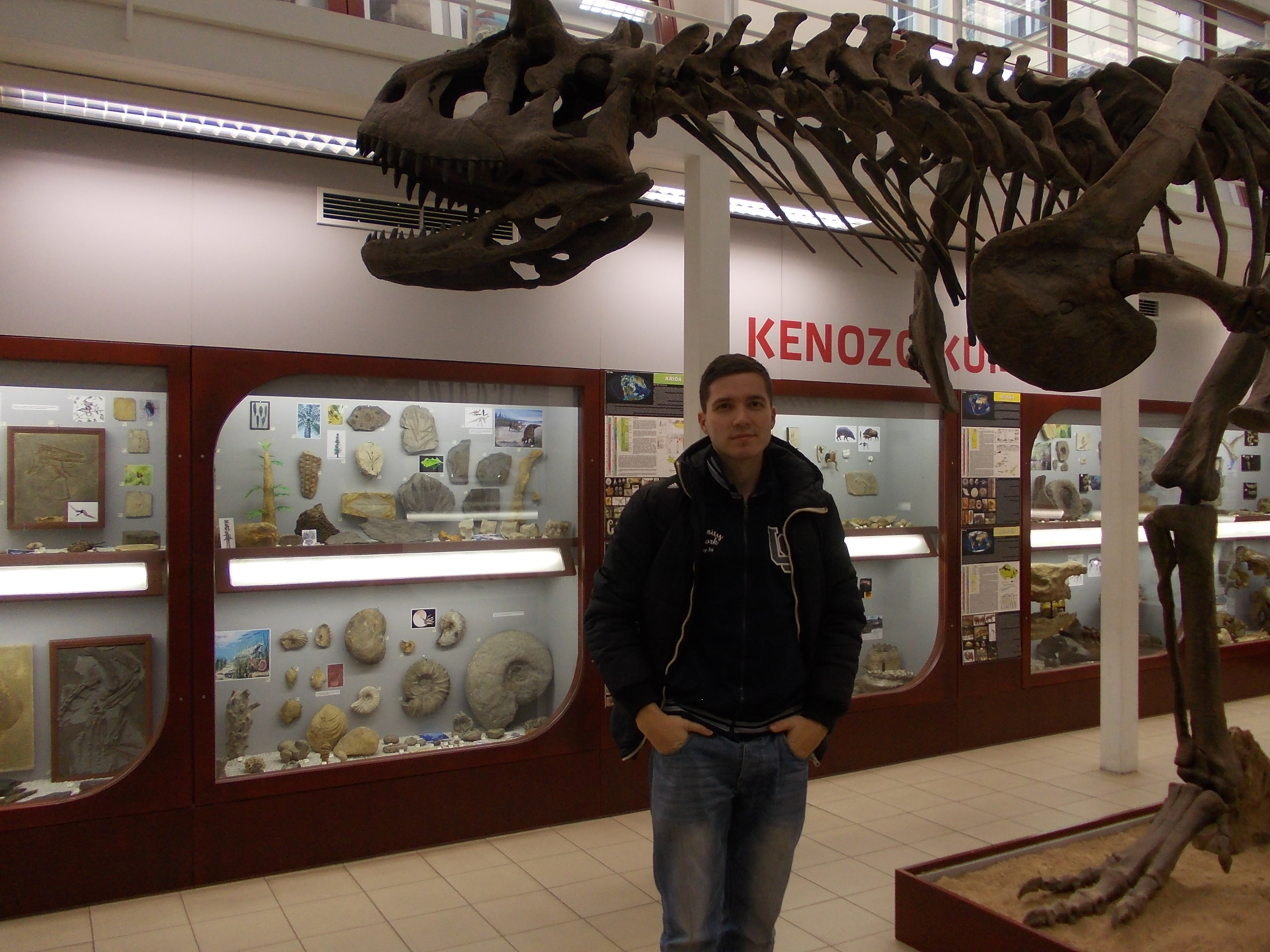
Vladimír Socha by the skeleton of theropod dinosaur Carnotaurus sastrei, Chlupáč Museum of Earth's History, Albertov, Prague (2015).
