= Bartłomiej Socha =

Polish footballer (born 1981)

Personal information
- Date of birth: 26 August 1981 (age 45)
- Place of birth: Zabrze, Poland
- Height: 1.82 m (5 ft 11 1/2 in)
- Position: Striker

Team information
- Current team: Silesia Lubomia II
- Number: 9

Youth career
- Górnik Zabrze
- SMS Wrocław
- Stal Mielec

Senior career*
Years	Team	Apps	(Gls)
1997–1998	Stal Mielec		
1998	Aluminium Konin		
1999	Włókniarz Kietrz		
2000–2001	Odra Wodzisław	17	(1)
2002	Ruch Radzionków		
2002–2003	Odra Wodzisław	18	(1)
2003–2005	Koszarawa Żywiec		
2005	Podbeskidzie Bielsko-Biała	5	(0)
2006	Heko Czermno	12	(1)
2006	Ditton Daugavpils	2	(0)
2007	Górnik Zabrze	9	(2)
2007–2008	Odra Wodzisław	22	(4)
2009	Zagłębie Sosnowiec	7	(0)
2009–2011	Kolejarz Stróże	52	(22)
2011–2012	Silesia Lubomia		
2013	LKS Krzyżanowice		
2013–2015	Silesia Lubomia		
2015–2017	Odra Centrum Wodzisław Śląski		
2017–2019	Silesia Lubomia	40	(26)
2019–2024	LKS Raszczyce	57	(47)
2024–	Silesia Lubomia II	9	(11)
- * Club domestic league appearances and goals as of 21 December 2024

Bartłomiej Socha (born 26 August 1981) is a Polish footballer who plays as a striker for Silesia Lubomia II.

== Honours ==
Silesia Lubomia

- Polish Cup (Racibórz regionals): 2013–14, 2014–15

Odra Centrum Wodzisław Śląski

- Regional league Katowice III: 2016–17
- Klasa A Rybnik: 2015–16
- Polish Cup (Rybnik regionals): 2016–17

LKS Raszczyce

- Klasa A Racibórz: 2020–21
- Klasa B Racibórz: 2019–20
