= Julian Bartoszewicz =

Polish historian

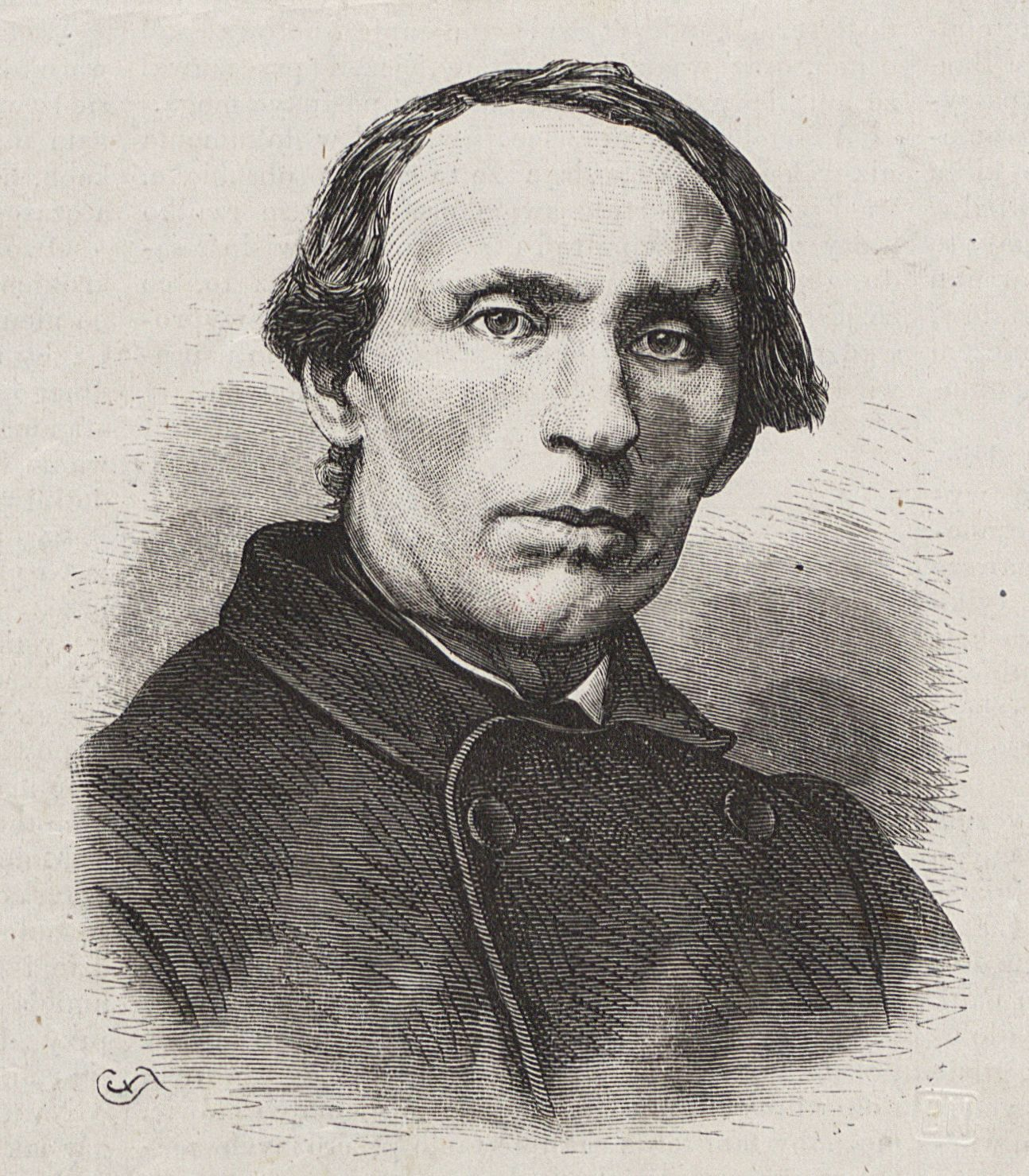
Julian Bartoszewicz

Julian Bartoszewicz (1821–1870) was a Polish historian. He was born on Biała Podlaska, in Congress Poland.

Bartoszewicz wrote a biography on Nicolaus Copernicus, which was published together with the Collected Works of Copernicus in 1854 in Warsaw. He became internationally known for the biography.

== Works ==
- Poglądy na stosunki Polski z Turcją i Tatarami (1860)
