= Bartosz Beda =

Polish artist

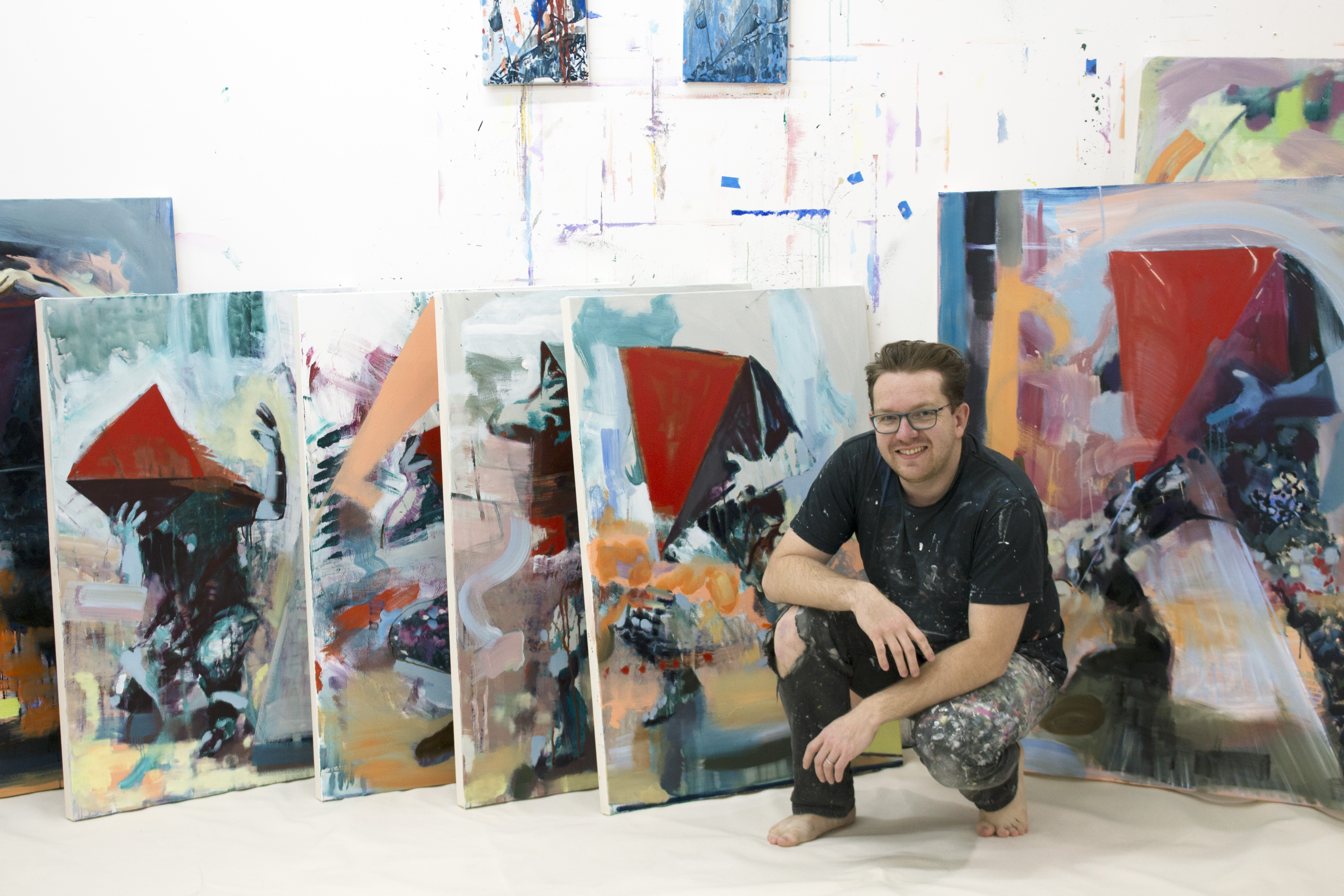

Bartosz Beda is a Polish contemporary artist living and working in the United States.

== Work ==
Beda has been showing nationally and internationally. He has participated in many group shows in Poland, Germany, Spain, United States, United Kingdom and Colombia. He had his solo exhibitions in Poland, the United Kingdom, Spain and Colombia and forthcoming in the United States. He is also a founder of Execute Magazine.

Beda was selected for the 2012 Catlin Art Guide as one of the promising emerging artists in the UK. In 2012, Beda was short-listed for Saatchi New Sensations, and won the esteemed Towry Award for the Best of North of England as well as a six-month scholarship to Dresden Academy of Fine Arts.

Beda had solo exhibitions at Galeria Liebre, Spain (2013), BAC Gallery, Colombia (2015), Jackson-Teed, England (2016), and received a fellowship from Fondazione per l'Arte in Rome, Italy in 2016.

== Education ==
Bartosz Beda relocated to Manchester, England in 2008. After graduating with an MA in Fine Art in 2012 from Manchester Metropolitan University, he was awarded a six-month scholarship to the Dresden Academy of Fine Arts.

== Books ==
- Hear My Voice by Bartosz Beda (May 2017) ISBN 978-0692855119
