= Bartosiewicz =

Bartosiewicz (Polish pronunciation: [bartɔˈɕɛvitʂ]) is a surname of Polish-language origin. It may refer to:

- Bohdan Bartosiewicz (1918–2015), Polish basketball and volleyball player and coach
- Edyta Bartosiewicz (born 1965), Polish rock singer, composer and songwriter
- Oliwia Bartosiewicz (born 2001), Polish rapper and singer
- Peter Bartosiewicz (born 1942), pair skater who competed for Czechoslovakia
- Thomas J. Bartosiewicz (1948–2005), New York state senator 1976–1988

== See also ==
- Bartoszewicz
