= Bodo Schäfer =

German writer and speaker

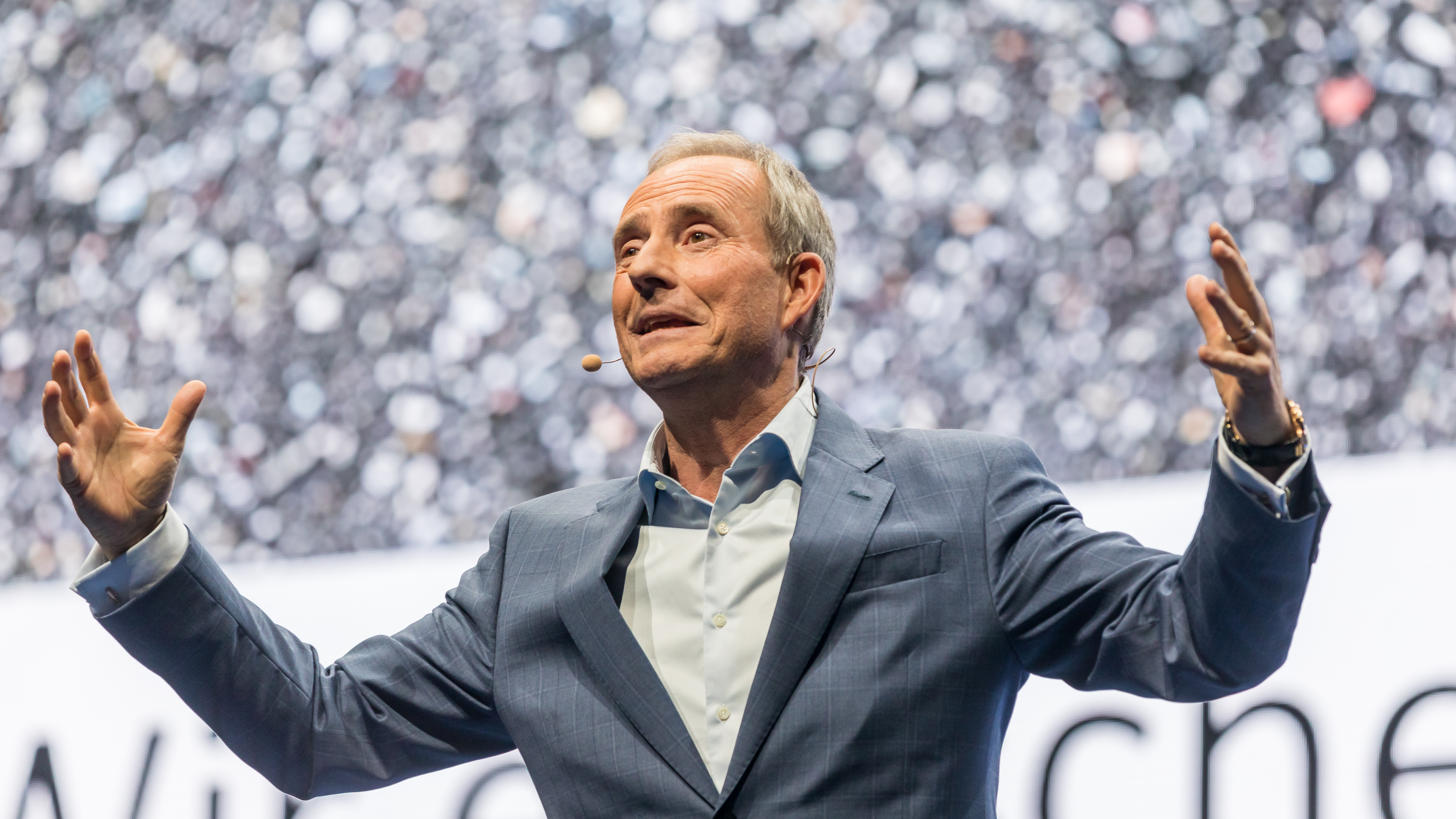
- Bodo Schäfer in 2018
- Born: 10 September 1960 (age 66); Cologne, Germany
- Occupations: Author and public speaker
- Website: bodoschaefer.de

Bodo Schäfer (born 10 September 1960 in Cologne) is a German author and public speaker. He is described as financial coach and has written several books with international impact about wealth-building, success and positioning. Publications such as "The Road to Financial Freedom" or the children's book "A Dog named Money" have been translated into more than twenty languages and have become bestsellers in Germany and other countries like Japan or South Korea.

In 2021, a new edition of "A Dog Named Money" was ranked no. 1 for six months on the children's book bestseller list in China.

== Published books in German (selection) ==
- Der Weg zur finanziellen Freiheit. Campus Verlag, Frankfurt 1998.
- Ein Hund namens Money. Lentz 2000.
- Endlich mehr verdienen. dtv, München 2004.
- Die Gesetze der Gewinner. dtv, München 2003.
- Praxis-Handbuch Positionierung. Ahead Products 2005.
- Wohlstand ohne Stress. dtv, München 2005.
- Rente oder Wohlstand. FinanzBuch Verlag, München 2016.
- Ich kann das. dtv, München 2021.

== Language versions of "A dog named Money" ==
Different Wikipedia articles about the book:

- Armenian: Կիրան և Մանի անունով շունը
- German: Ein Hund namens Money
- Korean: 열두 살에 부자가 된 키라
- Russian: Пёс по имени Мани
- Ukrainian: Пес на ім'я Мані, або Абетка грошей
- Chinese:ch:小狗钱钱
