= Paweł Socha (footballer) =

Polish footballer (born 1991)

Personal information
- Date of birth: 13 August 1991 (age 35)
- Place of birth: Lublin, Poland
- Height: 1.85 m (6 ft 1 in)
- Position: Goalkeeper

Team information
- Current team: Motor Lublin Academy (goalkeeping coordinator)

Youth career
- Górnik Łęczna
- Korona Kielce

Senior career*
Years	Team	Apps	(Gls)
2008–2011	Korona Kielce II	8	(0)
2009	→ Wisła Puławy (loan)	14	(0)
2011	→ Stal Stalowa Wola (loan)	15	(0)
2011–2016	Bogdanka/Górnik Łęczna	9	(0)
2015	→ KS Lublinianka (loan)	19	(0)
2016	→ Motor Lublin (loan)	13	(0)
2016–2018	Motor Lublin	48	(0)
2018–2022	Wisła Puławy	48	(0)
2022–2025	Świdniczanka Świdnik	94	(0)

International career
2009	Poland U19		
- * Club domestic league appearances and goals as of 09:36, 24 June 2025 (UTC)

Paweł Socha (born 13 August 1991) is a Polish professional footballer who plays as a goalkeeper. He formerly played for Korona Kielce, Stal Stalowa Wola, Górnik Łęczna, KS Lublinianka, Motor Lublin and Wisła Puławy. He currently works as a goalkeeping coordinator of Motor Lublin's academy.

== Career ==
Socha began his career at Górnik Łęczna. After playing a few seasons at youth level for Korona Kielce, in February 2011, he joined Stal Stalowa Wola on loan, and he made his professional debut on 13 March 2011 in a 0–0 away draw against Puszcza Niepołomice. In the summer of 2011, he returned to Górnik Łęczna.

In February 2016, Socha joined Motor Lublin on loan. He made thirteen appearances and conceded ten goals. In August 2016, he signed a contract with Motor. On 30 June 2017, Socha signed a one-year deal that included a mutual option for the 2018–19 season.

On 30 July 2018, Socha signed with his former club Wisła Puławy.

== Honours ==
Motor Lublin

- III liga Lublin–Subcarpathia: 2015–16
- Polish Cup (Lublin subdistrict regionals): 2016–17

Wisła Puławy

- III liga, group IV: 2020–21
- Polish Cup (Lublin subdistrict regionals): 2020–21

Świdniczanka Świdnik

- IV liga Lublin I: 2022–23
- Polish Cup (Lublin subdistrict regionals): 2022–23
