= Tomislav =

- Pronunciation: Croatian: [tǒmislaʋ]
- Gender: masculine

Origin
- Origin: Slavic
- Meaning: Proto-Slavic: *tomiti (to "languish", "torture", "struggle", "pine" or "yearn") + *slava ("glory")

Other names
- Alternative spelling: Cyrillic: Томислав
- Related names: female form Tomislava, Tomisław, Tomiszláv

Tomislav (pronounced [tǒmislaʋ], Cyrillic: Томислав) is a Slavic masculine given name, that is widespread among South Slavs.

The name is considered to be a compound of Proto-Slavic *tomiti ('to torment') and *slava ('glory').

The first recorded bearer of the name was the 10th-century King Tomislav of Croatia, for this reason it has become popular among Croats. In Croatia, the name Tomislav was among the top ten most common masculine given name in the decades between 1970 and 1999. The name is also widespread amongst Serbs, reaching popularity during the 1930s and 40s. King Alexander I of Yugoslavia gave his second child the name as a symbolic gesture of unity for his subjects. The name is also carried within the nations of Slovenia, Bosnia and Herzegovina, Montenegro, North Macedonia, and Bulgaria.

Amongst West Slavs in Poland, the Czech Republic, and Slovakia, the cognate is Tomisław, and among Hungarians it is Tomiszláv.

== People with the name ==
=== Arts and entertainment ===
- Tomislav Dretar, Croatian novelist
- Tomislav Ivčić, Croatian singer
- Tomislav Ladan, Croatian novelist
- Tomislav Miličević, American musician
- Tomislav Mužek, Croatian tenor
- Tomislav Osmanli, Macedonian screenwriter
- Tomislav "Toma" Zdravković, Serbian singer
- Tomislav Zografski, Macedonian composer

=== Business ===
- Tomislav Damnjanovic, Serbian businessman & arms smuggler
- Tomislav Momirović, Serbian businessman and politician
- Tomislav Karadžić, Montenegrin-Serb businessman & football administrator
- Jan Tomislav Topić, Ecuadorian businessman and presidential candidate

=== Media ===
- Tomislav Jakić, Croatian journalist
- Tomislav Kezarovski, Macedonian journalist

=== Military ===
- Tomislav Sertić, Croatian General
- Tomislav Simović, Serbian Lieutenant General (JNA)

=== Politics ===
- Tomislav Donchev, Bulgarian politician
- Tomislav Karamarko, Croatian politician
- Tomislav Lampel, birth name of the Serbian-Israeli politician Yosef "Tommy" Lapid
- Tomislav Ljubenović, Serbian politician
- Tomislav Merčep, Croatian politician
- Tomislav Nikolić, former President of Serbia
- Tomislav Petrak, Croatian politician
- Tomislav Šuta, Croatian politician, mayor of Split
- Tomislav Žigmanov, Croat-Serbian politician

=== Royalty ===
- Tomislav of Croatia
- Prince Tomislav of Yugoslavia
- Tomislav II (honorary title), Prince Aimone, 4th Duke of Aosta

=== Science and academia ===
- Tomislav Maretić, Croatian linguist & lexicographer
- Tomislav Šola, Croatian museologist
- Tomislav Trifić, Serbian academic & graphic artist
- Tomislav Volek, Czech musicologist

=== Sports ===
- Tomislav Ašković, Serbian long-distance runner
- Tomislav Brkić, Bosnian tennis player
- Tomislav Butina, Croatian footballer
- Tomislav Ćiraković, Montenegrin footballer
- Tomislav Colić, Serbian footballer
- Tomislav Crnković (footballer) (1929–2009), Croatian footballer
- Tomislav Crnković (canoeist) (born 1956), Croatian canoeist
- Tomislav Crnković (biathlete) (born 1991), Croatian biathlete
- Tomislav Dokić, Serbian volleyball player
- Tomislav Draganja, Croatian tennis player
- Tomislav Ivić, Croatian football manager
- Tomislav Ivković, Croatian footballer
- Tomislav Jagurinovski, Macedonian handball player
- Tomislav Jotovski, Macedonian tennis player
- Tomislav Jurić, Croatian footballer
- Tomislav Kaloperović, Serbian footballer & manager
- Tomislav Karlo, Croatian swimmer
- Tomislav Kelava, Serbian boxer
- Tomislav Knez, Bosnian footballer
- Tomi Kostadinov, Bulgarian footballer
- Tomislav Marić, Croatian footballer
- Tomislav Mikulić, Croatian footballer
- Tomislav Milićević, Serbian footballer
- Tomislav Mišura, Slovenian footballer
- Tomislav Mrčela, Australian footballer
- Tomislav Papazov, Bulgarian footballer
- Tomislav Pavlov, Bulgarian footballer
- Tomislav Pajović, Serbian footballer
- Tomislav Pondeljak, Australian footballer
- Tomislav Prosen, Croatian footballer
- Tomislav Pucar, Croatian table tennis player
- Tomislav Sivić, Serbian footballer
- Tomislav Smoljanović, Croatian rower
- Tomislav Šokota, Croatian footballer
- Tomislav Ternar, Slovenian tennis player
- Tomislav Tomić, Bosnian footballer
- Tomislav Višević, Bosnian-Croat footballer

== See also ==
- Tomisław (disambiguation)
- Slavic names
