= Krakow (disambiguation) =

Kraków is a city in southern Poland.

Krakow or Kraków may also refer to:

== Places ==
- Kraków County, Poland, adjacent to the city of Kraków
- Grand Duchy of Kraków (1846–1918), part of the Austrian Empire
- Krakow am See, Mecklenburg-Western Pomerania, Germany
- Krakau, Saxony, known as Krakow in Sorbian, a former town in Germany
- Krackow, Germany, known as Kraków in Polish, a municipality in Mecklenburg-Vorpommern
- Krąków, a village in central Poland
- Krakow Township, Michigan, United States
- Krakow, Missouri, United States
- Krakow, Nebraska, United States
- Krakow, Wisconsin, United States

== Other uses ==
- King Levinsky, born as Harris Kraków (1910–1991), American heavyweight boxer

== See also ==
- Nowy Kraków, Greater Poland Voivodeship
- Nowy Kraków, West Pomeranian Voivodeship
- Cracow (disambiguation)
- Krako (disambiguation)
- Krakov, in the Czech Republic
