= Dusniky =

Dusniky may refer to:

- Dušníky, the Czech name of Duszniki-Zdrój, a Polish town
- Dušníky, a Czech village

== See also ==
- Duszniki, a Polish toponym
