= Ljubenović =

Ljubenović is a surname. Notable people with the surname include:

- Milan Ljubenović (1932–1989), Serbian footballer
- Tomislav Ljubenović (born 1951), Serbian politician
- Željko Ljubenović (born 1981), Serbian football coach and former player
