= Baszków =

Baszków refers to the following places in Poland:

- Baszków, Greater Poland Voivodeship
- Baszków, Łódź Voivodeship
