= Łabędzie =

Łabędzie (which means "swans" in Polish) may refer to the following places:

- Łabędzie, Łódź Voivodeship (central Poland)
- Łabędzie, West Pomeranian Voivodeship (north-west Poland)

== See also ==
- Łabędź coat of arms
