= Kawęczynek =

Kawęczynek may refer to the following places:

- Kawęczynek, Łódź Voivodeship (central Poland)
- Kawęczynek, Lublin Voivodeship (east Poland)
- Kawęczynek, Masovian Voivodeship (east-central Poland)
