= List of Macedonian comics creators =

This is a list of Macedonian comics creators. Although comics have different formats, this list covers creators of comic books, graphic novels and comic strips, along with early innovators.

The list presents authors with the modern North Macedonia as their country of work, and does not imply their ethnic origin or identity. For other countries, see List of comic creators.

== A ==
- Toni Anastasovski
- Tome Andreevski
- Ivanka Apostolova

== B ==
- Marina Baleva
- Dine Baltakov
- Darko Bogdanov
- Atanas Botev

== C ==
- Goce Cvetanovski
- Smile Cvetanovski
- Zoran Cvetković
- Siniša Cvetkovski - Šiljo

== D ==
- Jordančo Davidovski
- Robert Dandarov
- Goran Dacev
- Goran Dačev - Gorand
- Mihajlo Dimitrievski - The Micho
- Rade Dičoski
- Kiro Donev
- Davor Dramićanin
- Spiro Džajkov
- Tomi Džurovski
- Lasko Džurovski
- Branko Šotra

== F ==
- Ljubomir Filipovski (Ljupčo Filipov)

== G ==
- Nikola Gelevski alias Pandalf Vulkanski
- Zdravko Girov
- Petar Gligorovski
- Miroslav Grčev

== I ==
- Dime Ivanov - Dimano
- Tode Ivanovski
- Ilija Ilievski

== J ==
- Zoran Janevski
- Vlado Janevski
- Slavko Janevski
- Pande Jarevski
- Dukan Jelen
- Ljupčo Jovanov
- Igor Jovčevski
- Ilija Jordanovski

== K ==
- Marjan Kamilovski
- Aco Karamanov
- Živko Kozar
- Dragan Kostić
- Miroslav Kostić
- Igor Kostovski
- Stefan Kocevski - Stef
- Igor Kralevski
- Boro Krstevski
- Zlatko Krstevski
- Vasil Kunovski

== L ==
- Miho Lazarov
- Borko Lazeski

== M ==
- Vlado Maleski
- Jordan Manasijeski
- Slavomir Marinković
- Nikola Marinoski
- Darko Marković
- Blagoja Milevski
- Darko Mitrevski
- Dragan Mitrevski
- Damjan Mihailov
- Delčo Mihajlov
- Miki Mladenov

== N ==
- Rumena Najčevska
- Stevan Nestorovski
- Ivančo Nikolov
- Vlado Nikolovski
- Mile Ničevski

== O ==
- Tomislav Osmanli

== P ==
- Aco Palitov
- Boro Pejčinov
- Dušan Perčinkov
- Toni Pešev
- Boban Pešov
- Lazo Plavevski
- Mirko Popov
- Vasilie Popović Cico
- Aleksandar Popovski
- Ilija Popovski
- Sašo Popovski
- Aleksandar Prokopiev
- Psilo i Ventolina (two girls with pseudonyms)

== R ==
- Darko Ristevski
- Antonio Rusevski

== S ==
- Dragan Sekulić
- Jovančo Sekulovski
- Riste Sekulovski
- Aleksandar Sotirovski
- Ivica Spasovski
- Aleksandar Stankovski
- Ljubomir Stefanov
- Ljubiša Sulimanović

== T ==
- Zoran Tanev
- Slavčo Temkov
- Nikola Temkov
- Mile Topuz
- Igor Toševski
- Kostadin Trajanovski
- Mladen Tunić

== U ==
- Vlada Urošević

== V ==
- Đuro Varga
- Bruno Veljanovski
- Tanja Vukobrat
- Tomo Vladimirski

== Z ==
- Dijano Zdravković

== Sources ==
- Tomislav Osmanli, „Razvojot na stripot vo Makedonija – sedum decenii stripovno tvoreštvo“, Strip, zapis so čovečki lik, „Mlad borec“, 1987; „Kultura“, Skopje 2002; Proekt Rastko - Makedonija, 14. 5. 2010.
- Makedonski strip forum: autori
- Živojin Tamburić, Zdravko Zupan i Zoran Stefanović. The Comics We Loved, Selection of 20th Century Comics and Creators from the Region of Former Yugoslavia (Stripovi koje smo voleli: Izbor stripova i stvaralaca sa prostora bivše Jugoslavije u XX veku), „Omnibus“, Beograd, 2011.
