= Duschnik =

Duschnik may refer to:

- Dušníky (Duschnik in German)
- Trhové Dušníky (Deutsch Duschnik in German)
