= Góra, Sieradz County =

Góra
- Village
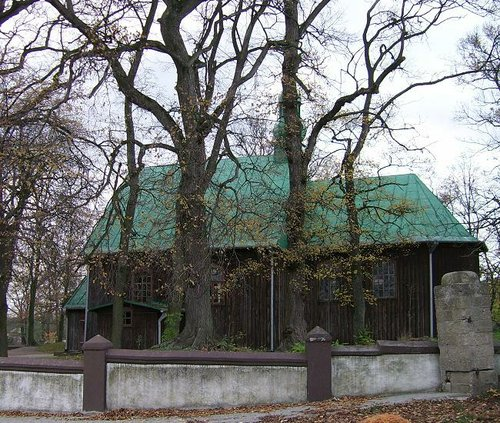
- Church of the Assumption of the Blessed Virgin Mary, Góra

- Location within Poland
- Coordinates: 51°43′N 18°30′E
- Country: Poland
- Voivodeship: Łódź
- County: Sieradz
- Gmina: Warta

Góra [ˈɡura] is a village in the administrative district of Gmina Warta, within Sieradz County, Łódź Voivodeship, in central Poland.
