= Proboszczowice, Łódź Voivodeship =

Proboszczowice
- Village
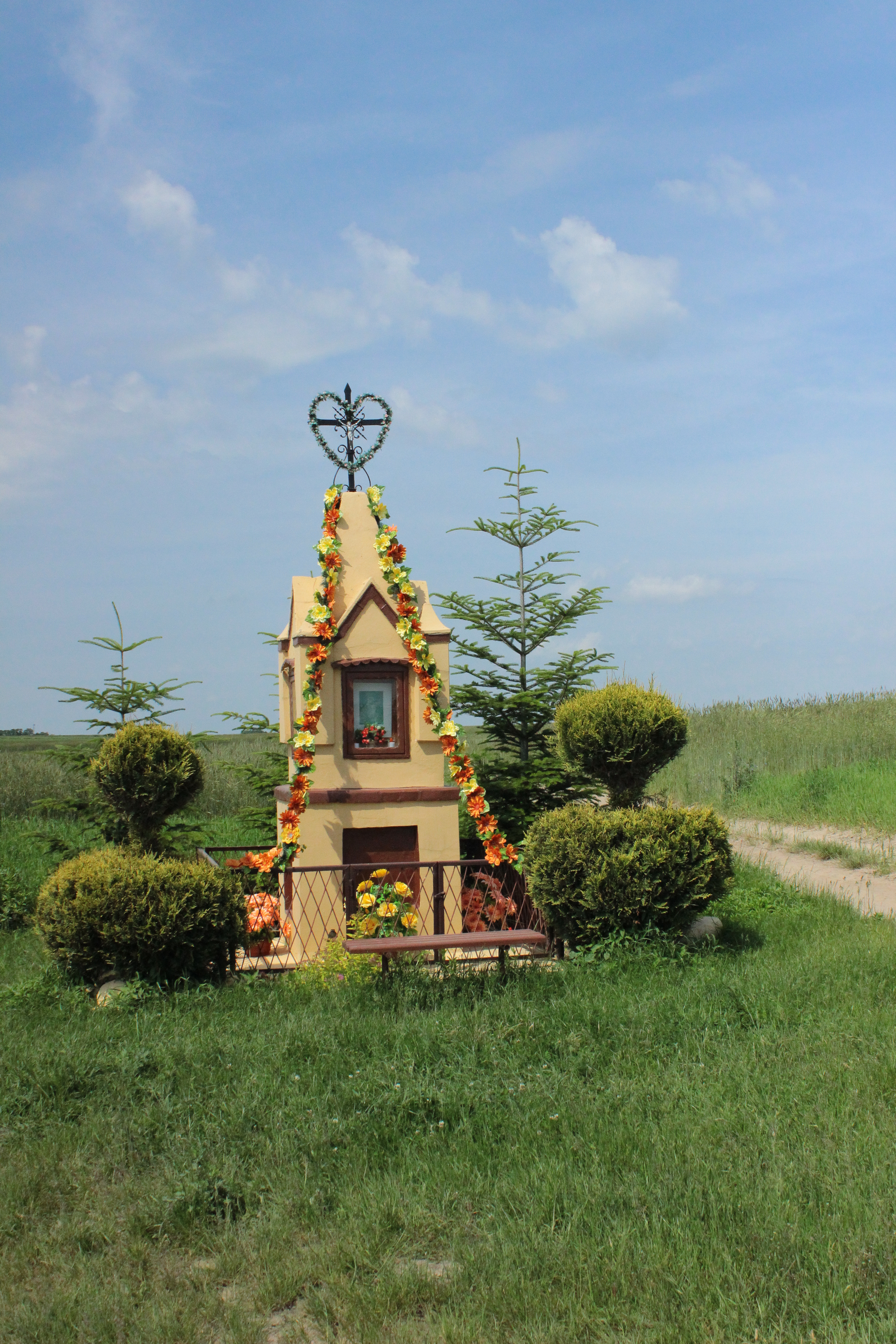

- Location within Poland
- Coordinates: 51°43′24″N 18°37′30″E
- Country: Poland
- Voivodeship: Łódź
- County: Sieradz
- Gmina: Warta

Proboszczowice [prɔbɔʂt͡ʂɔˈvit͡sɛ] is a village in the administrative district of Gmina Warta, within Sieradz County, Łódź Voivodeship, in central Poland.
