= Zakrzew, Sieradz County =

Zakrzew
- Village
- Location within Poland
- Coordinates: 51°47′17″N 18°38′05″E
- Country: Poland
- Voivodeship: Łódź
- County: Sieradz
- Gmina: Warta

Zakrzew [ˈzakʂɛf] is a village in the administrative district of Gmina Warta, within Sieradz County, Łódź Voivodeship, in central Poland.
