= Bartochów =

- Village
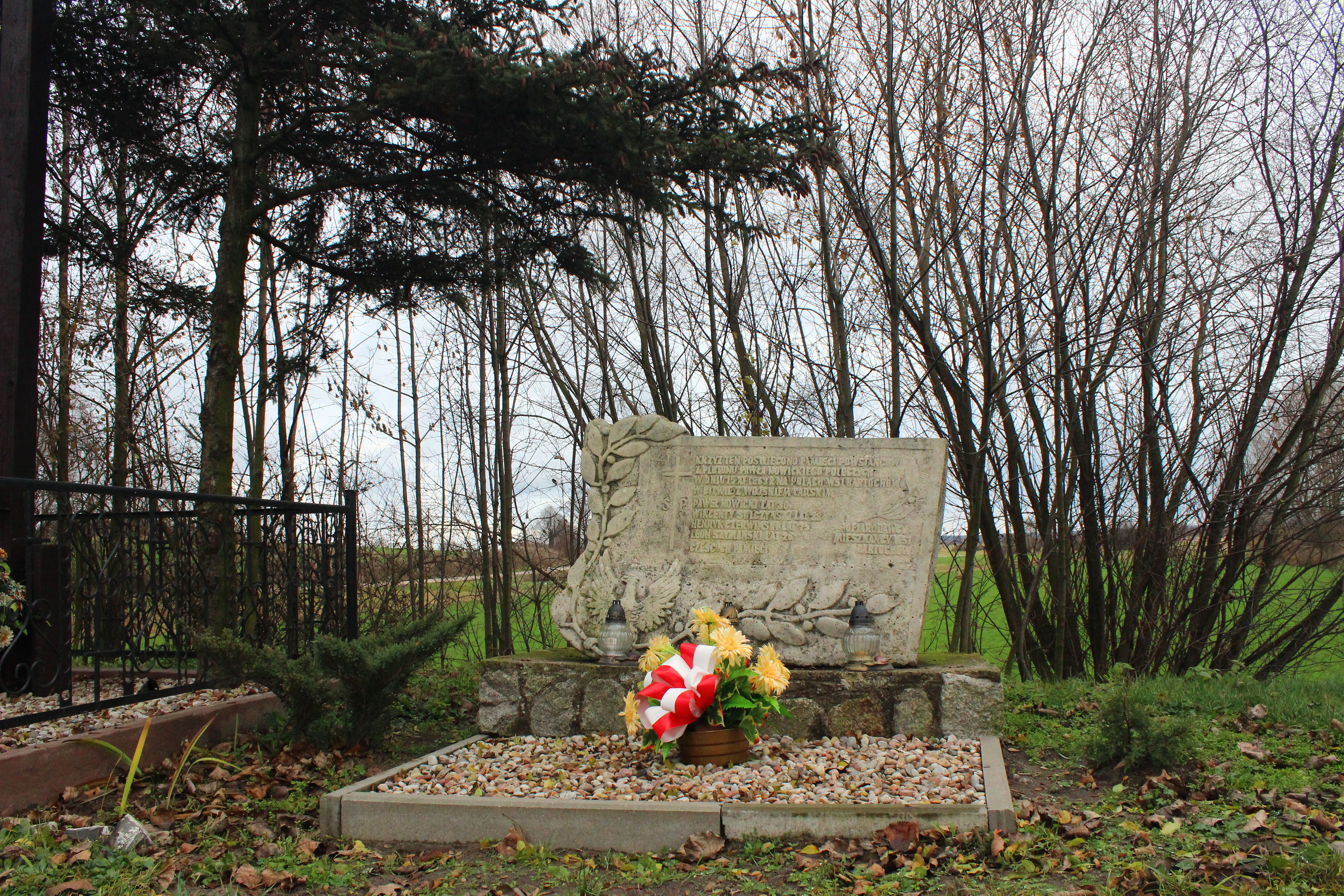

- Location within Poland
- Coordinates: 51°41′N 18°38′E
- Country: Poland
- Voivodeship: Łódź
- County: Sieradz
- Gmina: Warta
- Population: 380

Bartochów [barˈtɔxuf] is a village in the administrative district of Gmina Warta, within Sieradz County, Łódź Voivodeship, in central Poland.
