= Tądów Dolny =

- Village
- Location within Poland
- Coordinates: 51°46′8″N 18°38′25″E
- Country: Poland
- Voivodeship: Łódź
- County: Sieradz
- Gmina: Warta

Tądów Dolny [ˈtɔnduf ˈdɔlnɨ] is a village in the administrative district of Gmina Warta, within Sieradz County, Łódź Voivodeship, in central Poland.
