= Ustków, Łódź Voivodeship =

Ustków
- Village
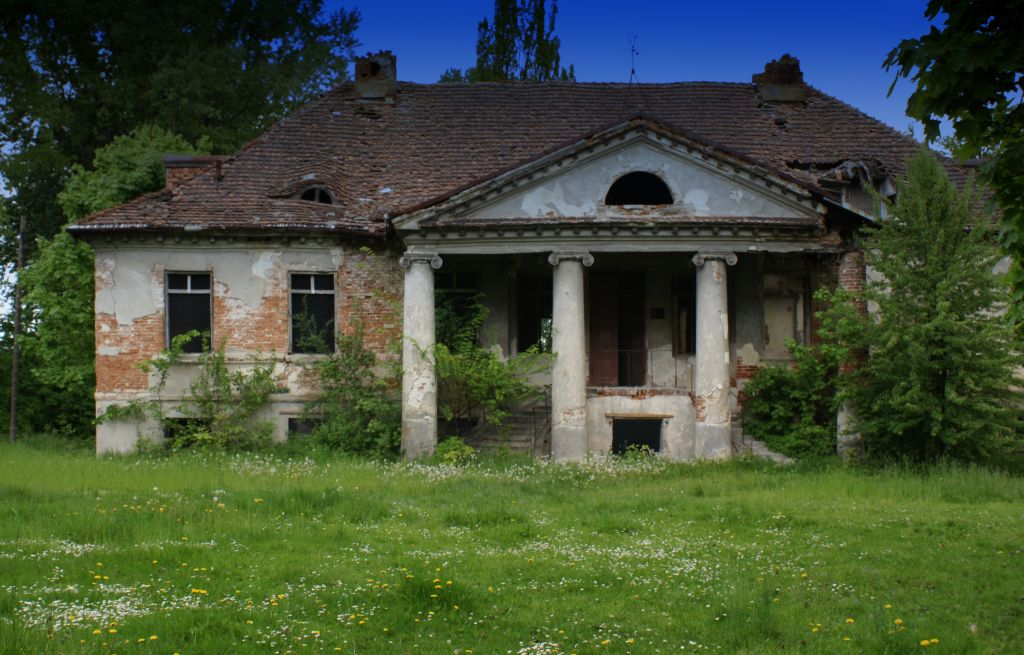
- Manor

- Location within Poland
- Coordinates: 51°45′52″N 18°35′58″E
- Country: Poland
- Voivodeship: Łódź
- County: Sieradz
- Gmina: Warta

Ustków [ˈustkuf] is a village in the administrative district of Gmina Warta, within Sieradz County, Łódź Voivodeship, in central Poland.
