= Mikołajewice, Sieradz County =

Mikołajewice
- Village
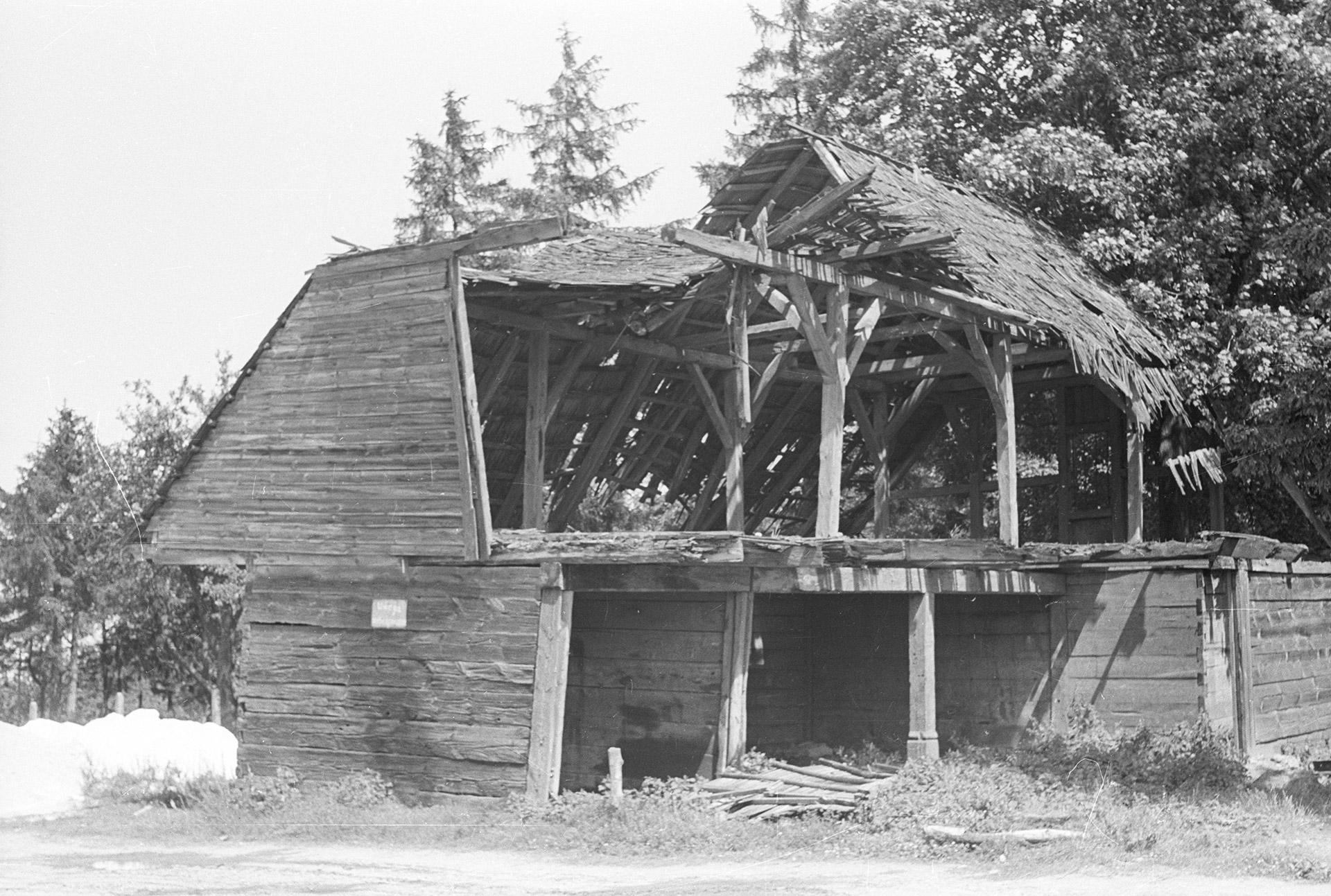
- Granary ruins

- Location within Poland
- Coordinates: 51°44′7″N 18°37′50″E
- Country: Poland
- Voivodeship: Łódź
- County: Sieradz
- Gmina: Warta

Mikołajewice [mikɔwajɛˈvit͡sɛ] is a village in the administrative district of Gmina Warta, within Sieradz County, Łódź Voivodeship, in central Poland.
