= Rossoszyca =

- Village
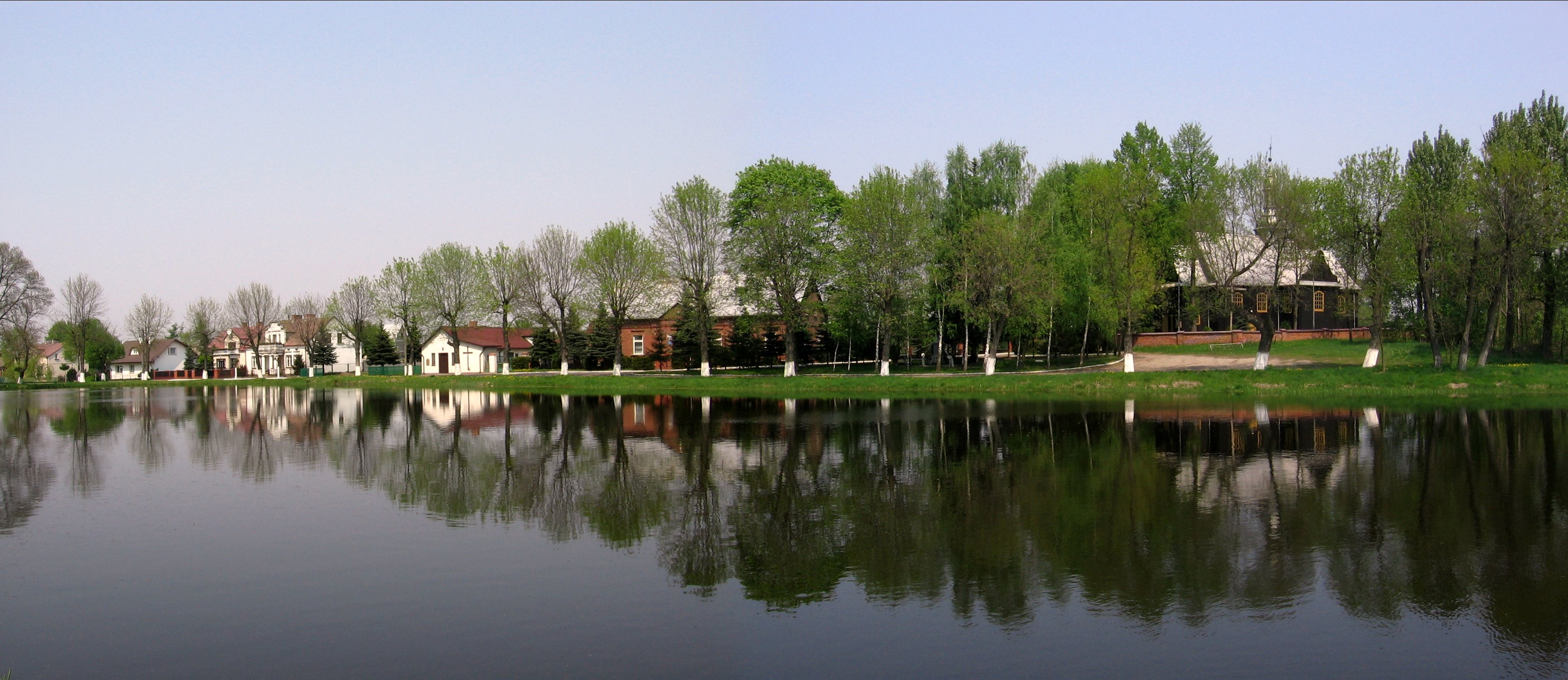
- Rossoszyca with the Church of Saint Lawrence

- Location within Poland
- Coordinates: 51°42′N 18°47′E
- Country: Poland
- Voivodeship: Łódź
- County: Sieradz
- Gmina: Warta

Population
  - Total: 570

Rossoszyca [rɔssɔˈʂɨt͡sa] is a village in the administrative district of Gmina Warta, within Sieradz County, Łódź Voivodeship, in central Poland.
