= Maszew =

- Village
- Location within Poland
- Coordinates: 51°48′14″N 18°37′55″E
- Country: Poland
- Voivodeship: Łódź
- County: Sieradz
- Gmina: Warta

Maszew [ˈmaʂɛf] is a village in the administrative district of Gmina Warta, within Sieradz County, Łódź Voivodeship, in central Poland.
