= Józefów-Wiktorów =

- Village
- Location within Poland
- Coordinates: 51°42′33″N 18°43′43″E
- Country: Poland
- Voivodeship: Łódź
- County: Sieradz
- Gmina: Warta

Józefów-Wiktorów (Polish pronunciation: [juˈzɛfuv vikˈtɔruf]) is a village in the administrative district of Gmina Warta, within Sieradz County, Łódź Voivodeship, in central Poland.
