= Zagajew =

- Village
- Location within Poland
- Coordinates: 51°42′N 18°35′E
- Country: Poland
- Voivodeship: Łódź
- County: Sieradz
- Gmina: Warta

Zagajew [zaˈɡajɛf] is a village in the administrative district of Gmina Warta, within Sieradz County, Łódź Voivodeship, in central Poland.
