= Rożdżały, Łódź Voivodeship =

Rożdżały
- Village
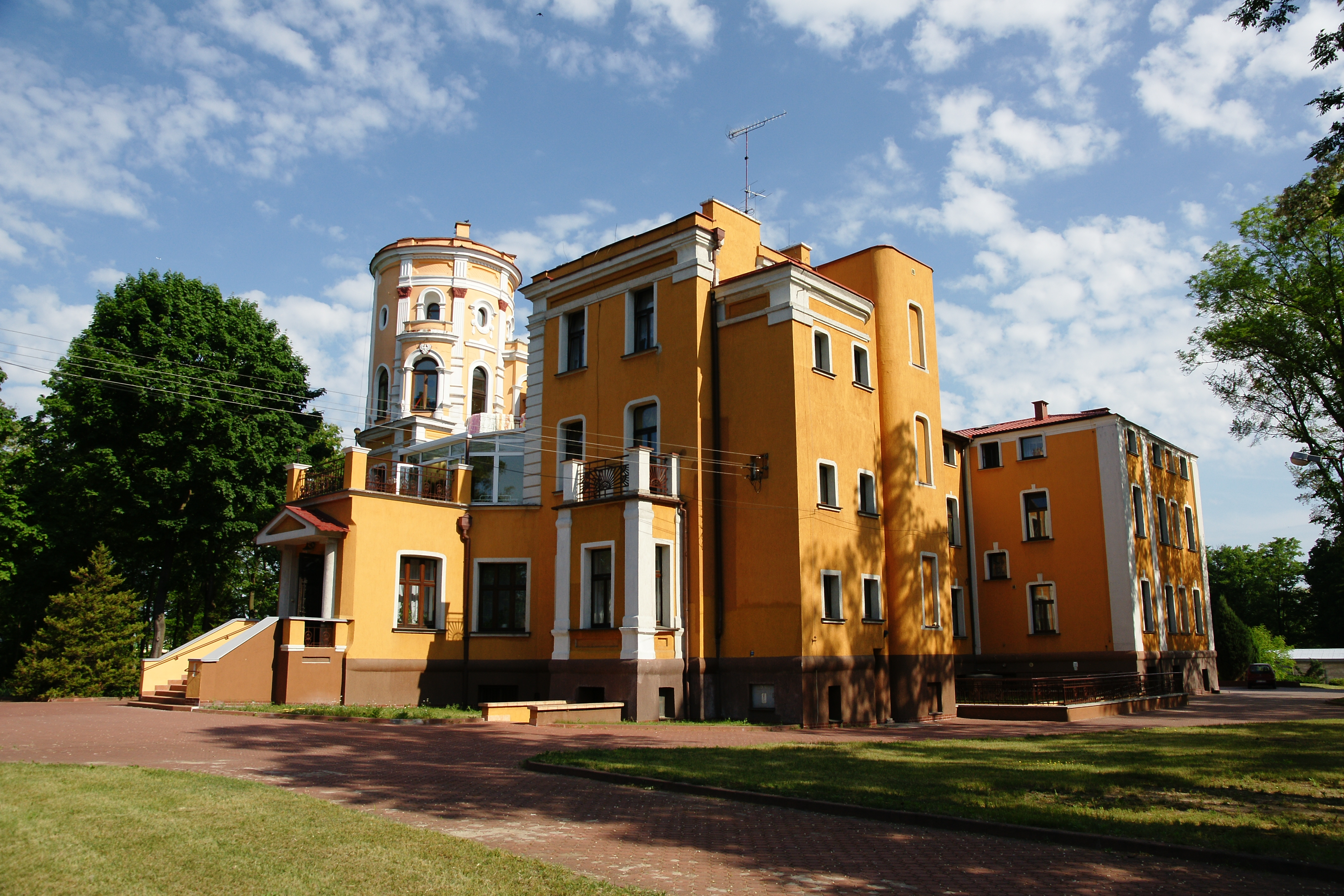
- Palace

- Location within Poland
- Coordinates: 51°44′N 18°49′E
- Country: Poland
- Voivodeship: Łódź
- County: Sieradz
- Gmina: Warta

Rożdżały [rɔʐˈd͡ʐawɨ] is a village in the administrative district of Gmina Warta, within Sieradz County, Łódź Voivodeship, in central Poland.
