= Józefka =

- Village
- Location within Poland
- Coordinates: 51°45′27″N 18°45′17″E
- Country: Poland
- Voivodeship: Łódź
- County: Sieradz
- Gmina: Warta

Józefka [juˈzɛfka] is a village in the administrative district of Gmina Warta, within Sieradz County, Łódź Voivodeship, in central Poland.
