= Grabinka, Gmina Warta =

Grabinka
- Village
- Location within Poland
- Coordinates: 51°42′46″N 18°48′28″E
- Country: Poland
- Voivodeship: Łódź
- County: Sieradz
- Gmina: Warta

Grabinka [ɡraˈbinka] is a village in the administrative district of Gmina Warta, within Sieradz County, Łódź Voivodeship, in central Poland.
