= Zielęcin, Sieradz County =

Zielęcin
- Village
- Location within Poland
- Coordinates: 51°44′N 18°31′E
- Country: Poland
- Voivodeship: Łódź
- County: Sieradz
- Gmina: Warta
- Population: 130

Zielęcin [ʑɛˈlɛnt͡ɕin] is a village in the administrative district of Gmina Warta, within Sieradz County, Łódź Voivodeship, in central Poland.
