= Włyń =

- Village
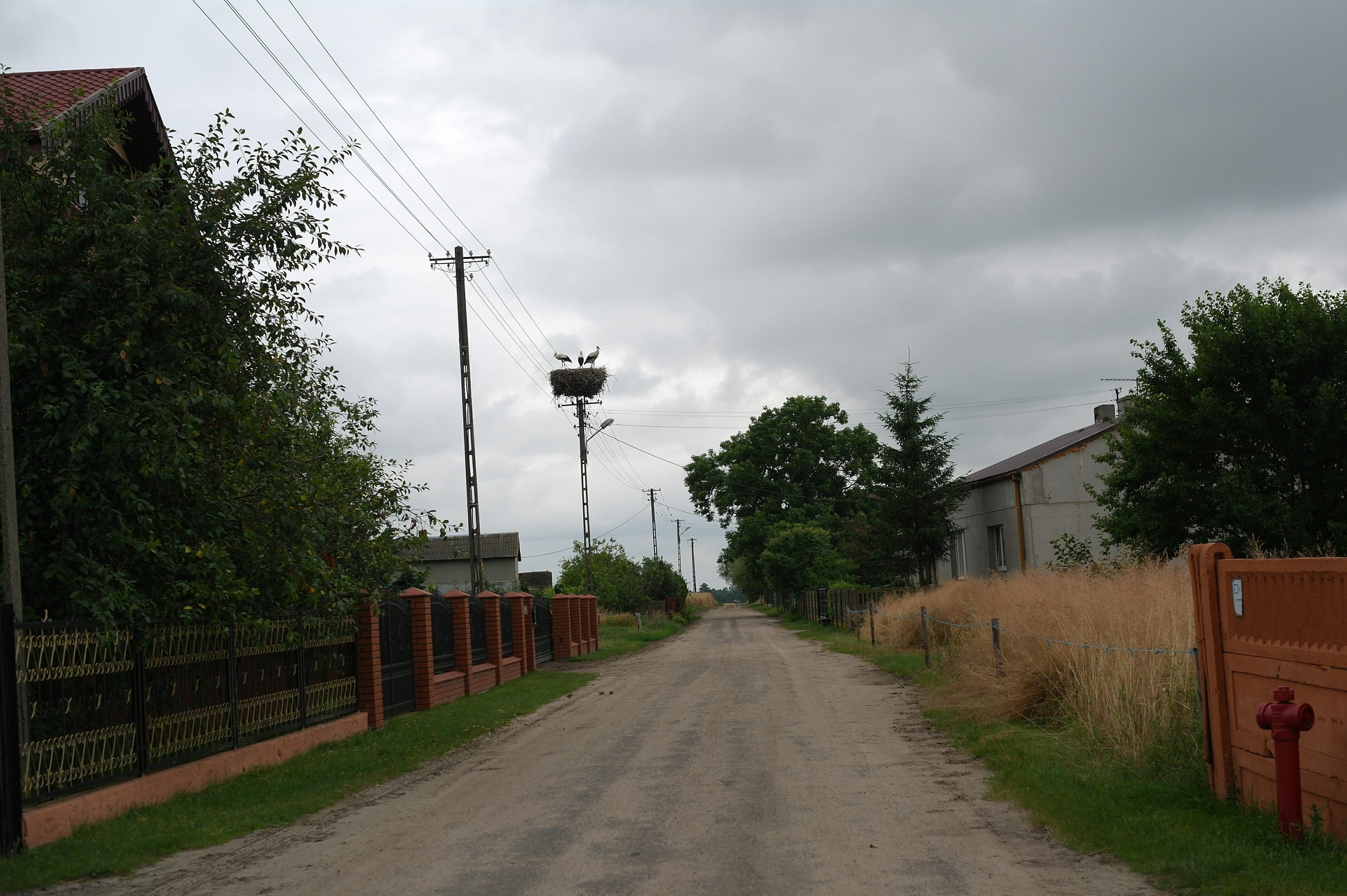

- Location within Poland
- Coordinates: 51°41′52″N 18°40′41″E
- Country: Poland
- Voivodeship: Łódź
- County: Sieradz
- Gmina: Warta

Włyń [vwɨɲ] is a village in the administrative district of Gmina Warta, within Sieradz County, Łódź Voivodeship, in central Poland.
