= Duszniki =

Duszniki may refer to the following places:

- Duszniki, Greater Poland Voivodeship (west-central Poland)
- Duszniki, Łódź Voivodeship (central Poland)
- Duszniki-Zdrój in Lower Silesian Voivodeship (south-west Poland)
