= Miedźno, Łódź Voivodeship =

Miedźno
- Village
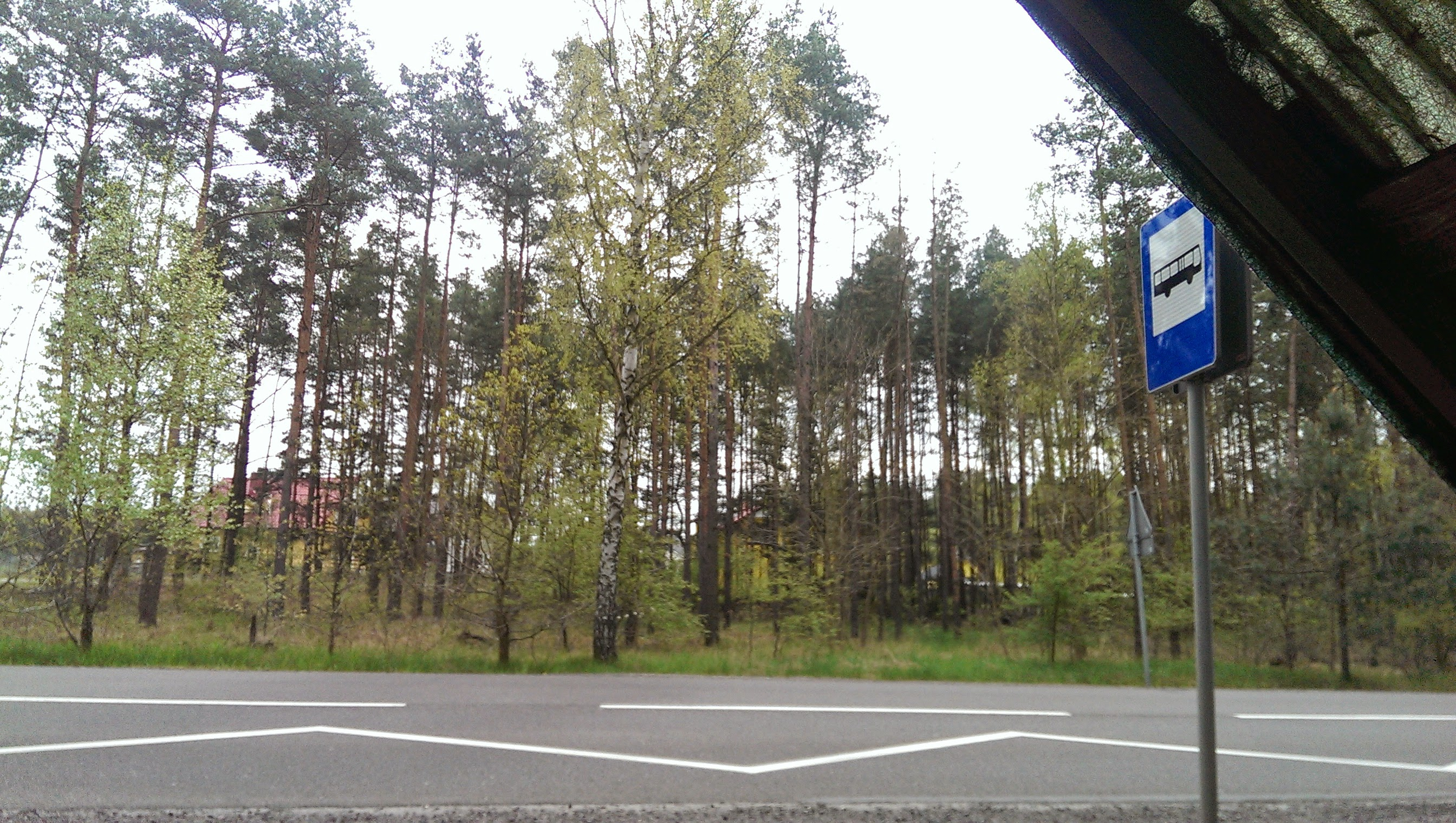

- Location within Poland
- Coordinates: 51°40′35″N 18°46′49″E
- Country: Poland
- Voivodeship: Łódź
- County: Sieradz
- Gmina: Warta

Miedźno [ˈmjɛd͡ʑnɔ] is a village in the administrative district of Gmina Warta, within Sieradz County, Łódź Voivodeship, in central Poland.
