= Zadąbrów-Rudunek =

- Village
- Location within Poland
- Coordinates: 51°47′28″N 18°35′41″E
- Country: Poland
- Voivodeship: Łódź
- County: Sieradz
- Gmina: Warta

Zadąbrów-Rudunek [zaˈdɔmbruf ruˈdunɛk] is a village in the administrative district of Gmina Warta, within Sieradz County, Łódź Voivodeship, in central Poland.
