= Raczków =

- Village
- Location within Poland
- Coordinates: 51°41′N 18°33′E
- Country: Poland
- Voivodeship: Łódź
- County: Sieradz
- Gmina: Warta

Raczków [ˈrat͡ʂkuf] is a village in the administrative district of Gmina Warta, within Sieradz County, Łódź Voivodeship, in central Poland.
