= Mogilno, Łódź Voivodeship =

Mogilno
- Village
- Location within Poland
- Coordinates: 51°41′53″N 18°49′18″E
- Country: Poland
- Voivodeship: Łódź
- County: Sieradz
- Gmina: Warta

Mogilno [mɔˈɡilnɔ] is a village in the administrative district of Gmina Warta, within Sieradz County, Łódź Voivodeship, in central Poland.
