= Małków, Łódź Voivodeship =

Małków
- Village
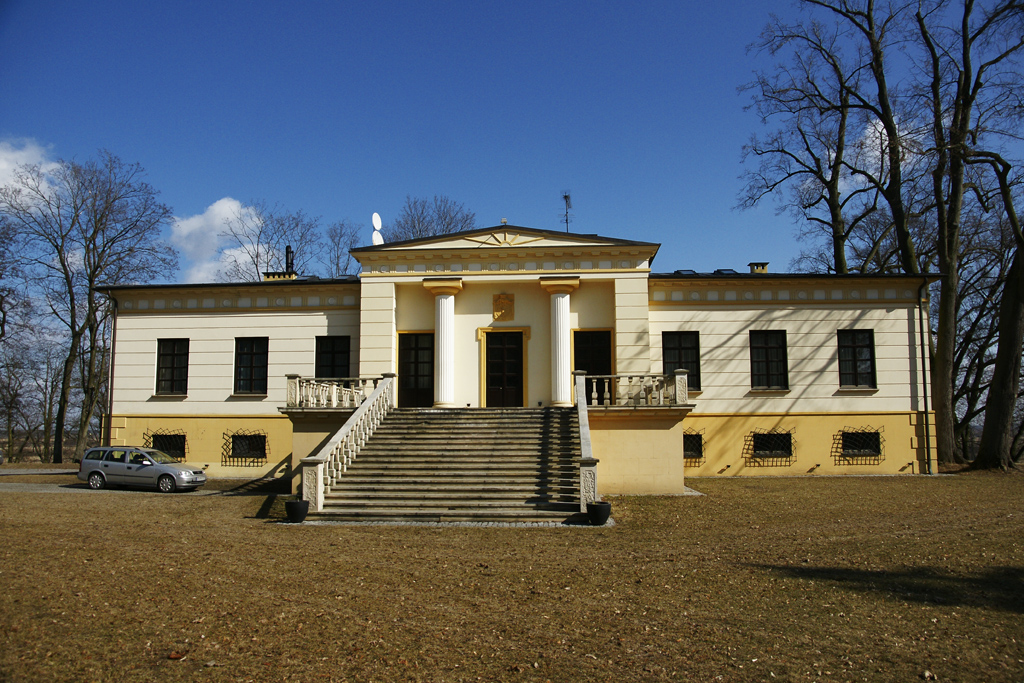
- Manor in the village

- Location within Poland
- Coordinates: 51°42′N 18°38′E
- Country: Poland
- Voivodeship: Łódź
- County: Sieradz
- Gmina: Warta

Population
  - Total: 380

Małków [ˈmau̯kuf] is a village in the administrative district of Gmina Warta, within Sieradz County, Łódź Voivodeship, in central Poland.
