= Gmina Warta =

Gmina Warta Warta Commune
- Gmina

- Flag Coat of arms
- Interactive map of Gmina Warta
- Coordinates (Warta): 51°42′N 18°38′E
- Country: Poland
- Voivodeship: Łódź
- County: Sieradz
- Seat: Warta

Area
  - Total: 252.91 km^{2} (97.65 sq mi)

Population (2006)
  - Total: 13,074
  - Density: 51.694/km^{2} (133.89/sq mi)
  - Urban: 3,388
  - Rural: 9,686
- Car plates: ESI
- Website: www.gimwarta.pl

Gmina Warta is an urban-rural gmina (administrative district) in Sieradz County, Łódź Voivodeship, in central Poland. Its seat is the town of Warta, which lies approximately 14 kilometres (9 mi) north-west of Sieradz and 59 km (37 mi) west of the regional capital Łódź.

The gmina covers an area of 252.91 square kilometres (97.6 sq mi), and as of 2006 its total population is 13,074 (out of which the population of Warta amounts to 3,388, and the population of the rural part of the gmina is 9,686).

== Villages ==
Apart from the town of Warta, Gmina Warta contains the villages and settlements of:

- Augustynów
- Bartochów
- Baszków
- Borek Lipiński
- Chorążka
- Cielce
- Czartki
- Duszniki
- Dzierzązna
- Gać Warcka
- Głaniszew
- Glinno
- Gołuchy
- Góra
- Grabinka
- Grzybki
- Jakubice
- Jeziorsko
- Józefka
- Józefów-Wiktorów
- Kamionacz
- Kawęczynek
- Klonówek
- Krąków
- Łabędzie
- Lasek
- Lipiny
- Małków
- Maszew
- Miedze
- Miedźno
- Mikołajewice
- Mogilno
- Nobela
- Ostrów Warcki
- Pierzchnia Góra
- Piotrowice
- Proboszczowice
- Raczków
- Raszelki
- Rossoszyca
- Rożdżały
- Socha
- Tądów Dolny
- Tądów Górny
- Tomisławice
- Ustków
- Witów
- Włyń
- Wola Miłkowska
- Wola Zadąbrowska
- Zadąbrów-Rudunek
- Zadąbrów-Wiatraki
- Zagajew
- Zakrzew
- Zaspy
- Zielęcin

== Neighbouring gminas ==
Gmina Warta is bordered by the gminas of Błaszki, Dobra, Goszczanów, Pęczniew, Sieradz, Szadek, Wróblew, Zadzim and Zduńska Wola.
