= Nobela =

- Village
- Location within Poland
- Coordinates: 51°40′17″N 18°41′30″E
- Country: Poland
- Voivodeship: Łódź
- County: Sieradz
- Gmina: Warta

Nobela [nɔˈbɛla] is a village in the administrative district of Gmina Warta, within Sieradz County, Łódź Voivodeship, in central Poland.
