= Cracow (disambiguation) =

Cracow or Kraków is a city in Poland.

Cracow may also refer to:

== Places ==
- Free City of Cracow (1815–1846), also known as Republic of Cracow, a city-state
- Cracow, Queensland, a town in the Banana Shire, Australia

== People with the surname ==
- Georg Cracow (1525–1575), German statesman

== Other uses ==
- Poulaine, also known as cracow or crakow, a style of shoes popular in Europe in the 15th century

== See also ==
- Krakow (disambiguation)
- Krako (disambiguation)
