= Borek Lipiński =

- Village
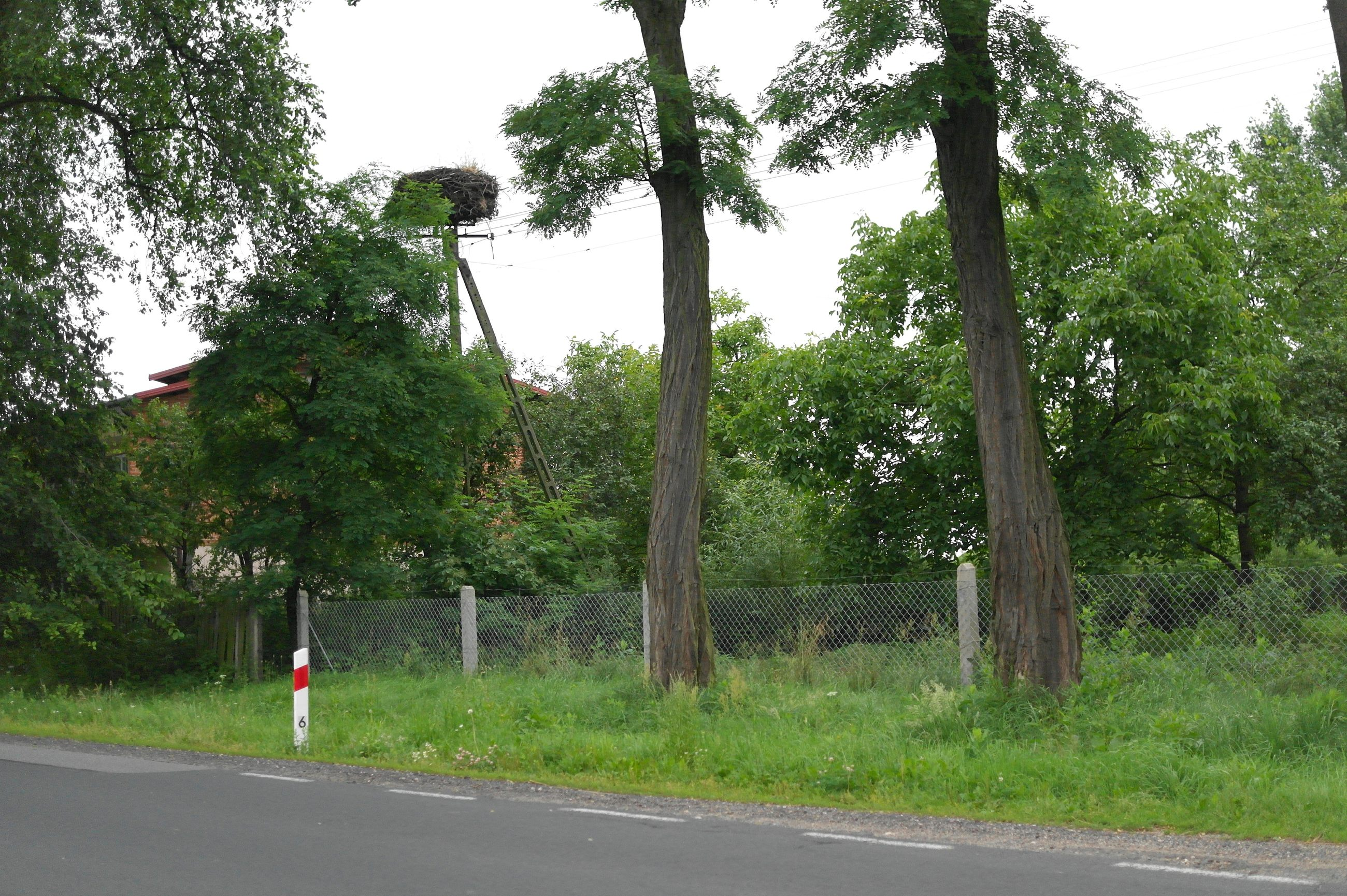

- Location within Poland
- Coordinates: 51°42′10″N 18°48′32″E
- Country: Poland
- Voivodeship: Łódź
- County: Sieradz
- Gmina: Warta

Borek Lipiński [ˈbɔrɛk liˈpiɲski] is a village in the administrative district of Gmina Warta, within Sieradz County, Łódź Voivodeship, in central Poland.
