= Miedze =

- Village
- Location within Poland
- Coordinates: 51°43′5″N 18°47′13″E
- Country: Poland
- Voivodeship: Łódź
- County: Sieradz
- Gmina: Warta

Miedze [ˈmjɛd͡zɛ] is a village in the administrative district of Gmina Warta, within Sieradz County, Łódź Voivodeship, in central Poland.
