= Tomisław =

Tomisław (Polish: [tɔˈmiswaf]) may refer to:

- Tomisław, Lower Silesian Voivodeship, a village in Gmina Osiecznica, Bolesławiec County in Lower Silesian Voivodeship, SW Poland
- Tomisław Tajner, Polish ski-jumper

== See also ==
- Tomisławice, Łódź Voivodeship, Poland
