= Augustynów, Sieradz County =

Augustynów
- Village
- Location within Poland
- Coordinates: 51°43′13″N 18°35′33″E
- Country: Poland
- Voivodeship: Łódź
- County: Sieradz
- Gmina: Warta

Augustynów [auɡusˈtɨnuf] is a village in the administrative district of Gmina Warta, within Sieradz County, Łódź Voivodeship, in central Poland.
