= Krako =

Krako or krakos, may refer to:

== Places ==
- Kråkö, Porvoo, Finland; an island
- Krako, historical homeland of the Fante people in what is now Techiman, Bono East, Ghana

== People ==
- Jakub Krako (born 1990), Paralympic skier for Slovakia
- Lene Olaug Kråkø, 2016 silver medalist for Norway at the IPSC Nordic Handgun Championship
- Peter Krako, guitarist for the Dutch band Twarres
- Krako, the founder of Upper Reka, Reka, North Macedonia

=== Fictional characters ===
- Jojo Krako, a fictional character from the 1968 TV episode "A Piece of the Action" (Star Trek: The Original Series) from the original Star Trek TV show
- Krako, a fictional character from the Mexican animated TV show Serafín (TV series)
- Krako, a DC Comics villain for Aquaman; see List of Aquaman enemies
- Krakos, a Marvel Comics character, a Homo mermanus
- Krakos, a polar bear from New Looney Tunes

== Other uses ==
- Krakos, the Archidendron pauciflorum tree

== See also ==
- Cracow (disambiguation)
- Krakow (disambiguation)
  - Kraków, Poland
- Poulaine, a style of medieval European long-toed shoe also known as a crakow
