= Czartki, Gmina Warta =

Czartki
- Village
- Location within Poland
- Coordinates: 51°43′23″N 18°32′27″E
- Country: Poland
- Voivodeship: Łódź
- County: Sieradz
- Gmina: Warta

Czartki [ˈt͡ʂartki] is a village in the administrative district of Gmina Warta, within Sieradz County, Łódź Voivodeship, in central Poland.
