= Dzierzązna, Sieradz County =

Dzierzązna
- Village
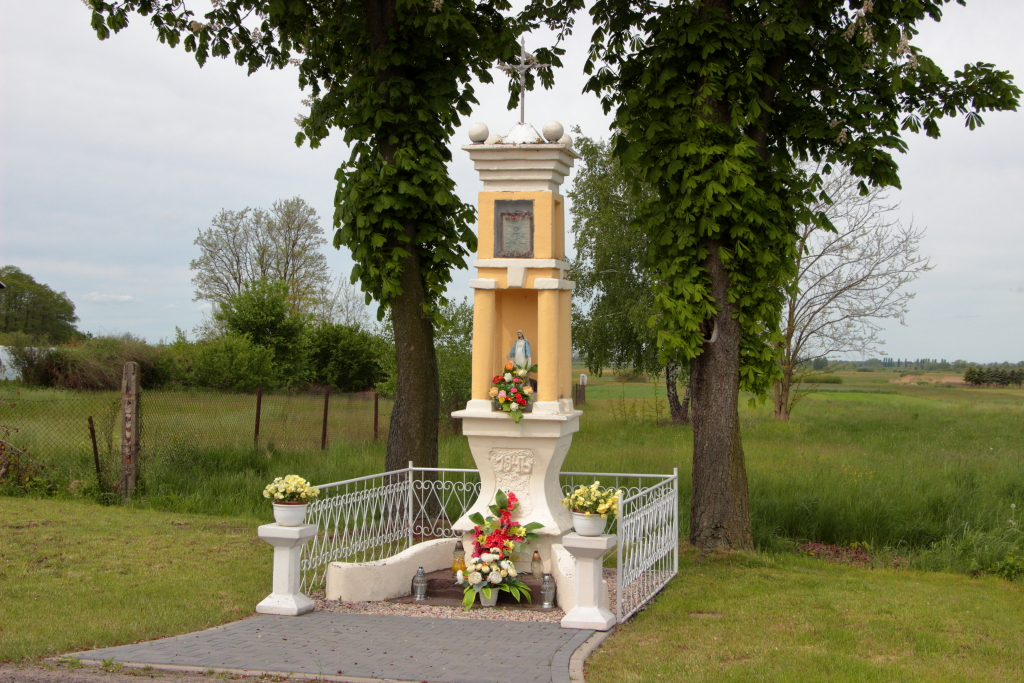

- Location within Poland
- Coordinates: 51°42′47″N 18°40′38″E
- Country: Poland
- Voivodeship: Łódź
- County: Sieradz
- Gmina: Warta

Dzierzązna [d͡ʑɛˈʐɔ̃zna] is a village in the administrative district of Gmina Warta, within Sieradz County, Łódź Voivodeship, in central Poland.
