= Lasek, Łódź Voivodeship =

Lasek
- Village
- Location within Poland
- Coordinates: 51°42′51″N 18°45′52″E
- Country: Poland
- Voivodeship: Łódź
- County: Sieradz
- Gmina: Warta
- Population: 150

Lasek [ˈlasɛk] is a village in the administrative district of Gmina Warta, within Sieradz County, Łódź Voivodeship, in central Poland.
