= Chorążka =

- Village
- Location within Poland
- Coordinates: 51°42′55″N 18°45′55″E
- Country: Poland
- Voivodeship: Łódź
- County: Sieradz
- Gmina: Warta
- Population: 5

Chorążka [xɔˈrɔ̃ʂka] is a village in the administrative district of Gmina Warta, within Sieradz County, Łódź Voivodeship, in central Poland.
