= Pierzchnia Góra =

- Village
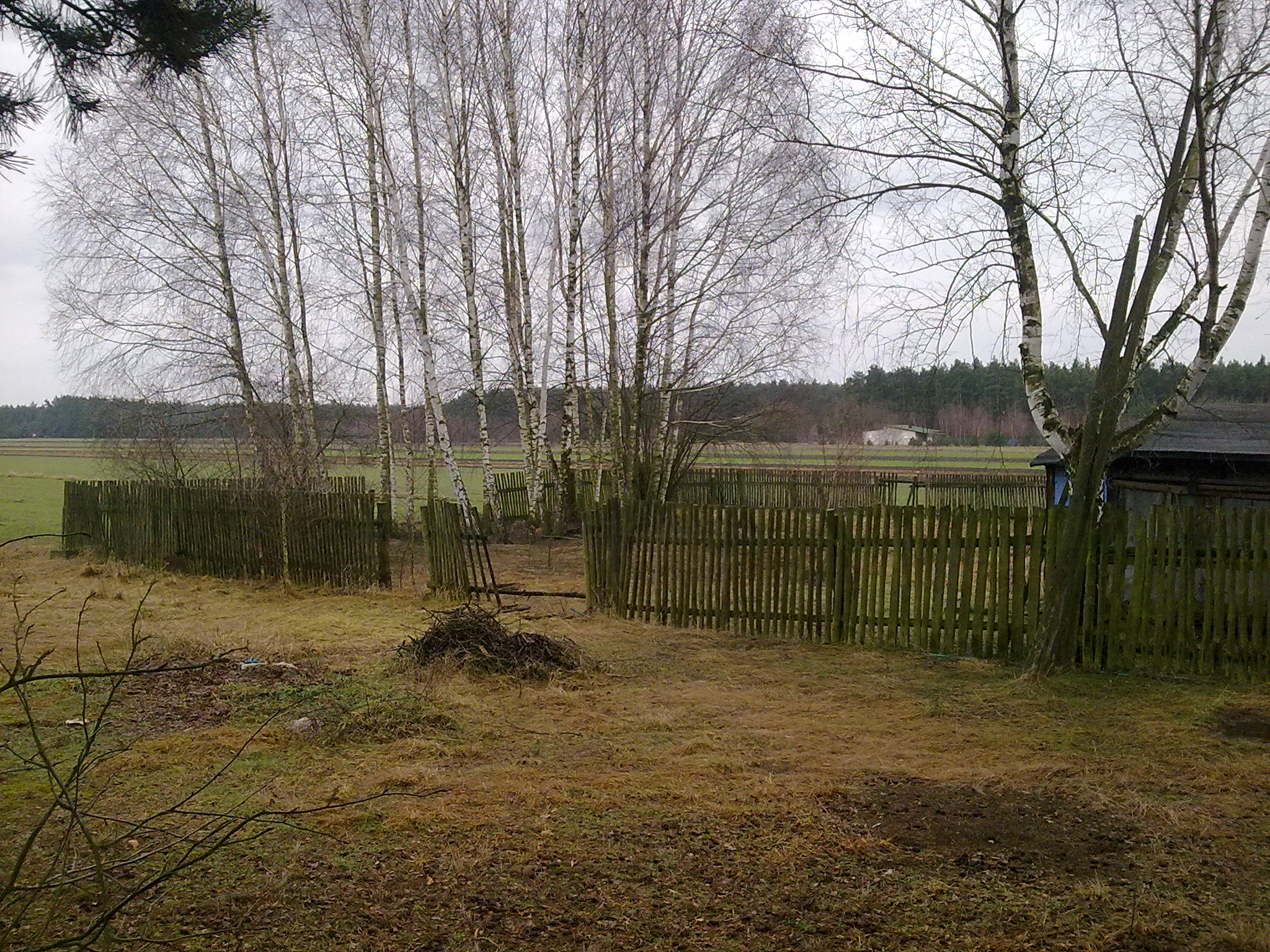

- Location within Poland
- Coordinates: 51°42′46″N 18°43′8″E
- Country: Poland
- Voivodeship: Łódź
- County: Sieradz
- Gmina: Warta

Pierzchnia Góra [ˈpjɛʂxɲa ˈɡura] is a village in the administrative district of Gmina Warta, within Sieradz County, Łódź Voivodeship, in central Poland.
