= Glinno, Łódź Voivodeship =

Glinno
- Village
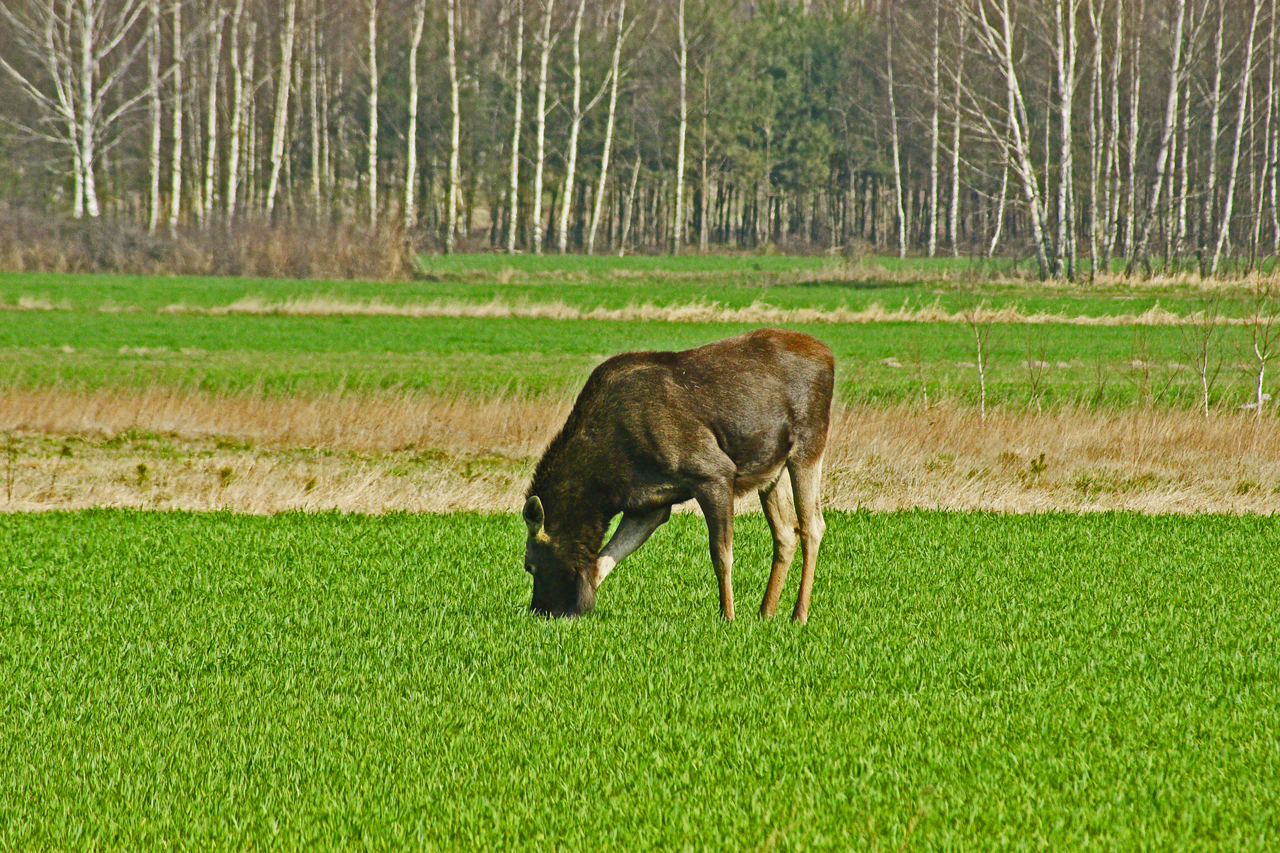

- Location within Poland
- Coordinates: 51°44′15″N 18°40′13″E
- Country: Poland
- Voivodeship: Łódź
- County: Sieradz
- Gmina: Warta

Glinno [ˈɡlinnɔ] is a village in the administrative district of Gmina Warta, within Sieradz County, Łódź Voivodeship, in central Poland.
