= Socha, Łódź Voivodeship =

Socha
- Village
- Location within Poland
- Coordinates: 51°44′47″N 18°35′21″E
- Country: Poland
- Voivodeship: Łódź
- County: Sieradz
- Gmina: Warta
- Population: 270

Socha [ˈsɔxa] is a village in the administrative district of Gmina Warta, within Sieradz County, Łódź Voivodeship, in central Poland.
