= Jeziorsko, Łódź Voivodeship =

Jeziorsko
- Village
- Location within Poland
- Coordinates: 51°47′44″N 18°38′54″E
- Country: Poland
- Voivodeship: Łódź
- County: Sieradz
- Gmina: Warta
- Population (approx.): 300

Jeziorsko [jɛˈʑɔrskɔ] is a village in the administrative district of Gmina Warta, within Sieradz County, Łódź Voivodeship, in central Poland.

The village has an approximate population of 300.
