= Gać Warcka =

- Village
- Location within Poland
- Coordinates: 51°40′16″N 18°31′50″E
- Country: Poland
- Voivodeship: Łódź
- County: Sieradz
- Gmina: Warta

Gać Warcka (Polish pronunciation: [ɡad͡ʑ ˈvart͡ska]) is a village in the administrative district of Gmina Warta, within Sieradz County, Łódź Voivodeship, in central Poland.
