= Lipiny, Gmina Warta =

Lipiny
- Village
- Location within Poland
- Coordinates: 51°42′28″N 18°48′58″E
- Country: Poland
- Voivodeship: Łódź
- County: Sieradz
- Gmina: Warta

Lipiny [liˈpinɨ] is a village in the administrative district of Gmina Warta, within Sieradz County, Łódź Voivodeship, in central Poland.
