= Zadąbrów-Wiatraki =

- Village
- Location within Poland
- Coordinates: 51°46′46″N 18°35′16″E
- Country: Poland
- Voivodeship: Łódź
- County: Sieradz
- Gmina: Warta

Zadąbrów-Wiatraki [zaˈdɔmbruf vjaˈtraki] is a village in the administrative district of Gmina Warta, within Sieradz County, Łódź Voivodeship, in central Poland.
