= Gołuchy =

- Village
- Location within Poland
- Coordinates: 51°40′4″N 18°35′22″E
- Country: Poland
- Voivodeship: Łódź
- County: Sieradz
- Gmina: Warta

Gołuchy [ɡɔˈwuxɨ] is a village in the administrative district of Gmina Warta, within Sieradz County, Łódź Voivodeship, in central Poland.
