= Cielce =

- Village
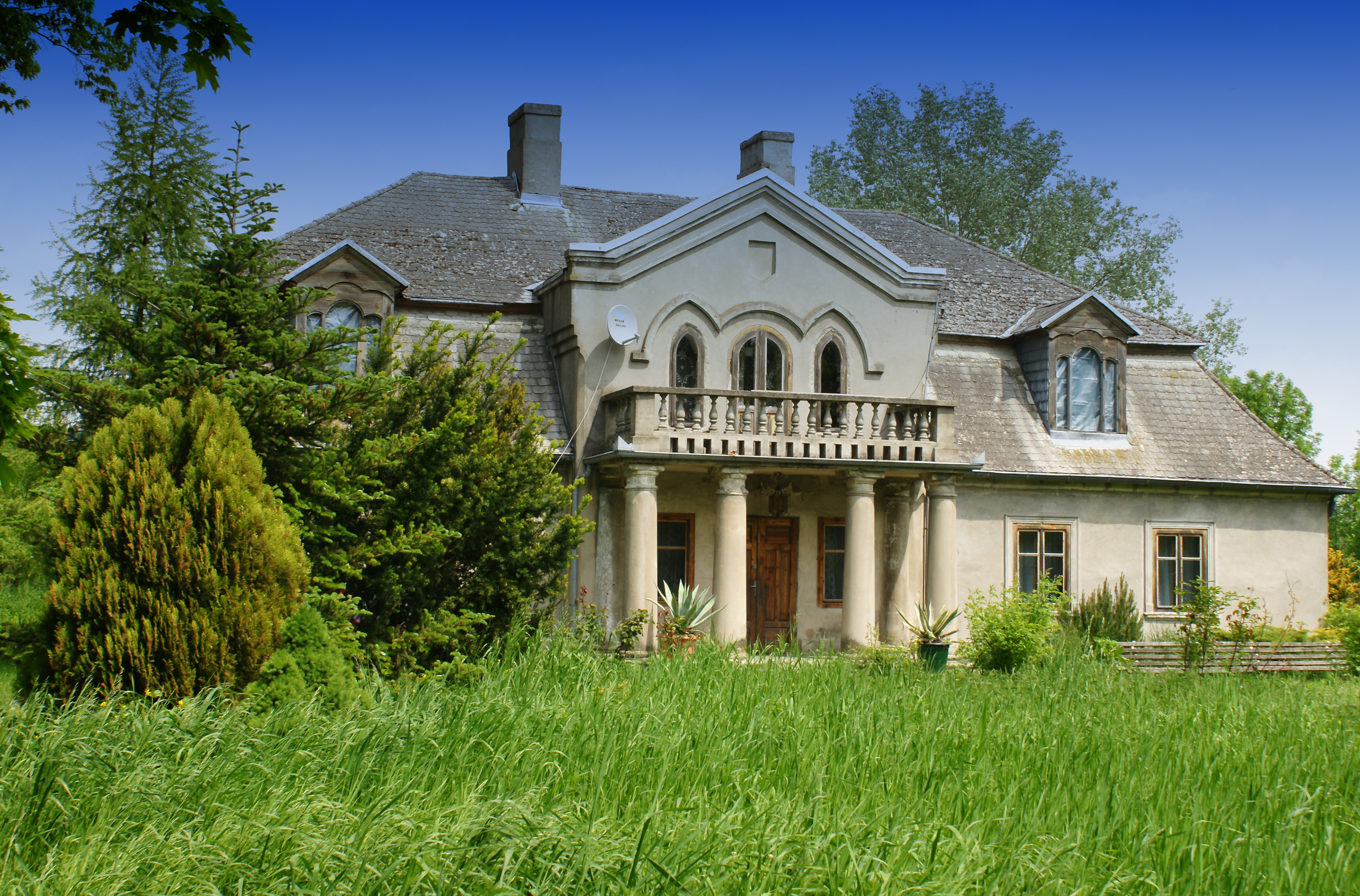
- Manor

- Location within Poland
- Coordinates: 51°44′N 18°34′E
- Country: Poland
- Voivodeship: Łódź
- County: Sieradz
- Gmina: Warta

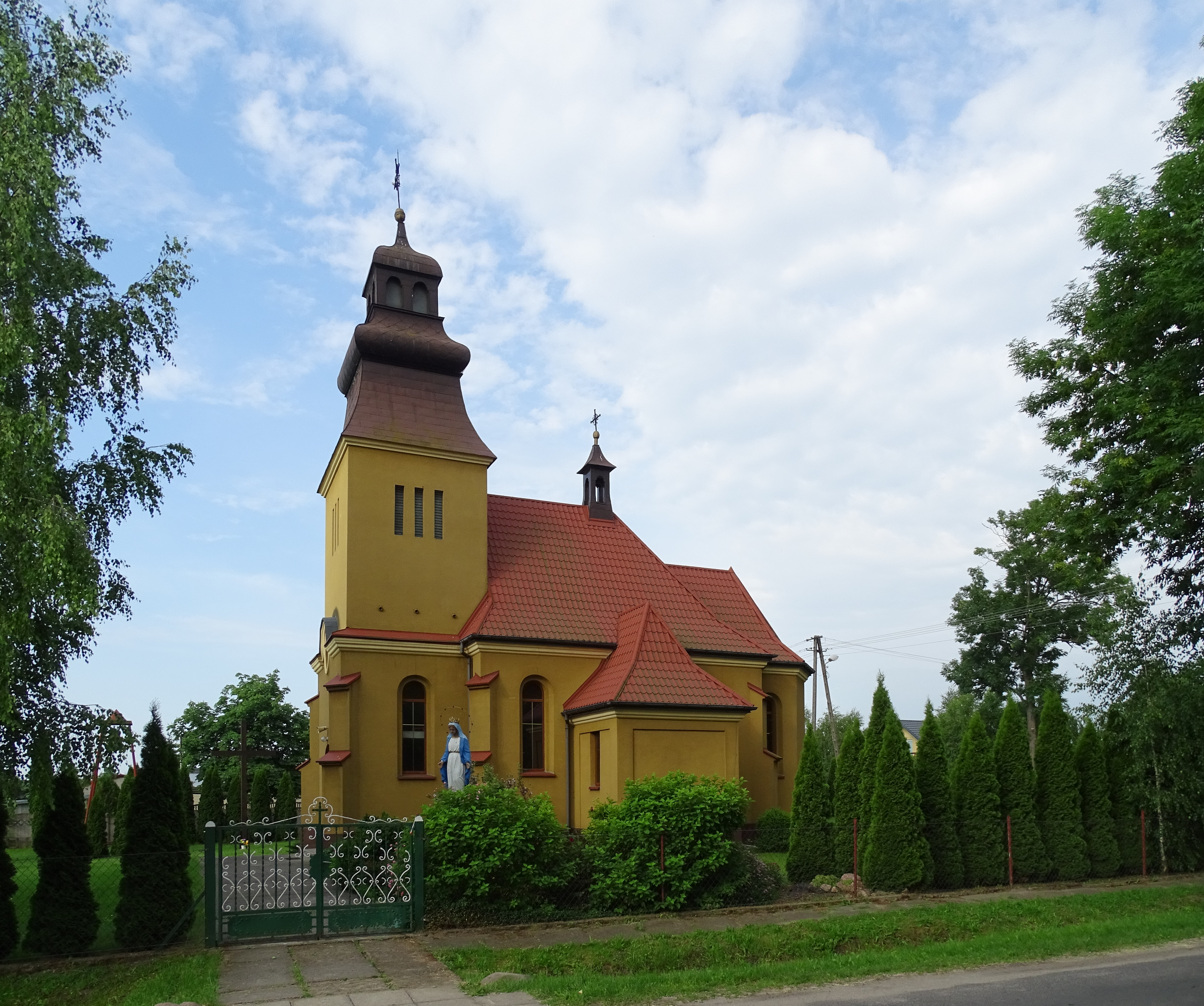
Chapel of Saint Teresa from 1932.

Cielce [ˈt͡ɕɛlt͡sɛ] is a village in the administrative district of Gmina Warta, within Sieradz County, Łódź Voivodeship, in central Poland. Village is a headquaters of Ochotnicza Straż Pożarna Cielce (volunteer fire department). Also, in 2026 in the village open a sport hall, near the primary school.
