= Piotrowice, Sieradz County =

Piotrowice
- Village
- Location within Poland
- Coordinates: 51°38′34″N 18°37′28″E
- Country: Poland
- Voivodeship: Łódź
- County: Sieradz
- Gmina: Warta

Piotrowice [pjɔtrɔˈvit͡sɛ] is a village in the administrative district of Gmina Warta, within Sieradz County, Łódź Voivodeship, in central Poland.
