= Tomislav Volek =

Czech musicologist

- Born: October 11, 1931 (age 94); Prague
- Education: PhD, Assoc. Prof. University of Prague
- Occupation: Musicologist
- Writing career
- Subjects: Music, Mozart

Tomislav Volek, is a Czech musicologist who is best known for his research on the music of Wolfgang Amadeus Mozart.

== Biography ==
Tomislav Volek (born 11 October 1931 in Prague) is a Czech musicologist specializing in the study of Wolfgang Amadeus Mozart and the musical culture of eighteenth-century Bohemia.

He studied musicology and history at Charles University in Prague from 1950 to 1955. He subsequently worked as an assistant at the Department of Musicology of the Faculty of Arts (1955–1964) and later as a researcher at the Institute of Musicology of the Czechoslovak Academy of Sciences (1965–1976).

During the period of political “normalization” in Czechoslovakia, Volek opposed prevailing ideological constraints in musicological research. After refusing to retract his views expressed in a 1971 article on music and politics, he was dismissed from the Academy of Sciences in 1976 and worked as an independent scholar until 1990.

After the political changes of 1989, he resumed systematic research and academic activity. He returned to teaching at Charles University as an external lecturer, offering courses on eighteenth-century Italian opera, musical classicism, and the interpretation of seventeenth- and eighteenth-century music. In 1998 he completed his habilitation with a study on the history of Italian opera in the Bohemian lands.

Volek's research focuses particularly on Mozart's operas associated with Prague, especially "Don Giovanni" and "La clemenza di Tito". In 1991, the Mozart anniversary year, he organized an international conference in Prague and participated in further international scholarly meetings.

Since 1989 he has served as president of the Mozart Society in the Czech Republic. In this role he was involved in a long-standing legal effort to secure the restitution of the Villa Bertramka in Prague, historically associated with Mozart, which was returned to the Society in 2009.

For his contributions to Mozart research, Volek has received several distinctions, including the Silver Medal of the International Mozarteum Foundation (1992), honorary membership of the Mozart Society of America (2009), and honorary membership of the Akademie für Mozart-Forschung at the Mozarteum Salzburg (2017).

== Books & Articles ==
- Mozart and Prague (Mozart a Praha). Supraphon, Prague 1973.
- The History of Czech Music in Pictures (Dějiny české hudby v obrazech = Geschichte der tschechischen Musik in Bildern: from the earliest monuments to the establishment of the National Theatre). Supraphon, Prague 1977.
- Mozart's Don Giovanni: Exhibition on the Occasion of the 200th Anniversary of the World Premiere in Prague 1787–1987 (Mozartův Don Giovanni: výstava k 200. výročí světové premiéry v Praze 1787–1987). State Library of the Czech Socialist Republic, Prague 1987.
- Prague operatic traditions and Mozart's Don Giovanni. In: Mozart's Don Giovanni in Prague. Theatre Institute Prague, 1987, pp. 21–91.
- The Mozartiana of Czech and Moravian archives. Archives Department of the Czech Ministry of Interior, Prague 1991.
- The significance of the Prague operatic tradition for the genesis of Don Giovanni and La clemenza di Tito (Die Bedeutung der Prager Operntradition für das Entstehen des Don Giovanni und Titus). In: Mozarts Opern für Prag. Theatre Institute Prague, 1991, pp. 21–100.
- Camillo Schoenbaum: Tomislav Volek. In: Stanley Sadie (ed.): The New Grove Dictionary of Music and Musicians, 2nd ed., vol. 26. London 2001, pp. 881–882.
- Tomislav Volek: Volek, Tomislav. In: Ludwig Finscher (ed.): Die Musik in Geschichte und Gegenwart, 2nd ed., supplement for both parts. Bärenreiter/Metzler, Kassel et al. 2008, cols. 1050–1051 (online edition, subscription required).
- Milada Jonášová, Tomislav Volek (eds.): Bohemian Aspects of the Life and Work of W. A. Mozart (Böhmische Aspekte des Lebens und des Werkes von W. A. Mozart). Institute of Ethnology of the Academy of Sciences of the Czech Republic, v.v.i., and Mozart Society of the Czech Republic, Prague 2011.
- Tomislav Volek: Mozart, die italienische Oper des 18. Jahrhunderts und das musikalische Leben im Königreich Böhmen. Mit der Don-Juan-Studie von Vladimír Helfert (Mozart, Italian Opera of the Eighteenth Century and Musical Life in the Kingdom of Bohemia. With the Don Juan study by Vladimír Helfert), ed. by Milada Jonášová and Matthias J. Pernerstorfer. 2 vols. Hollitzer Wissenschaftsverlag, Vienna 2016.
