= Baszków, Łódź Voivodeship =

Baszków
- Village
- Location within Poland
- Coordinates: 51°39′47″N 18°38′28″E
- Country: Poland
- Voivodeship: Łódź
- County: Sieradz
- Gmina: Warta

Baszków [ˈbaʂkuf] is a village in the administrative district of Gmina Warta, within Sieradz County, Łódź Voivodeship, in central Poland.
