= Krąków =

- Village
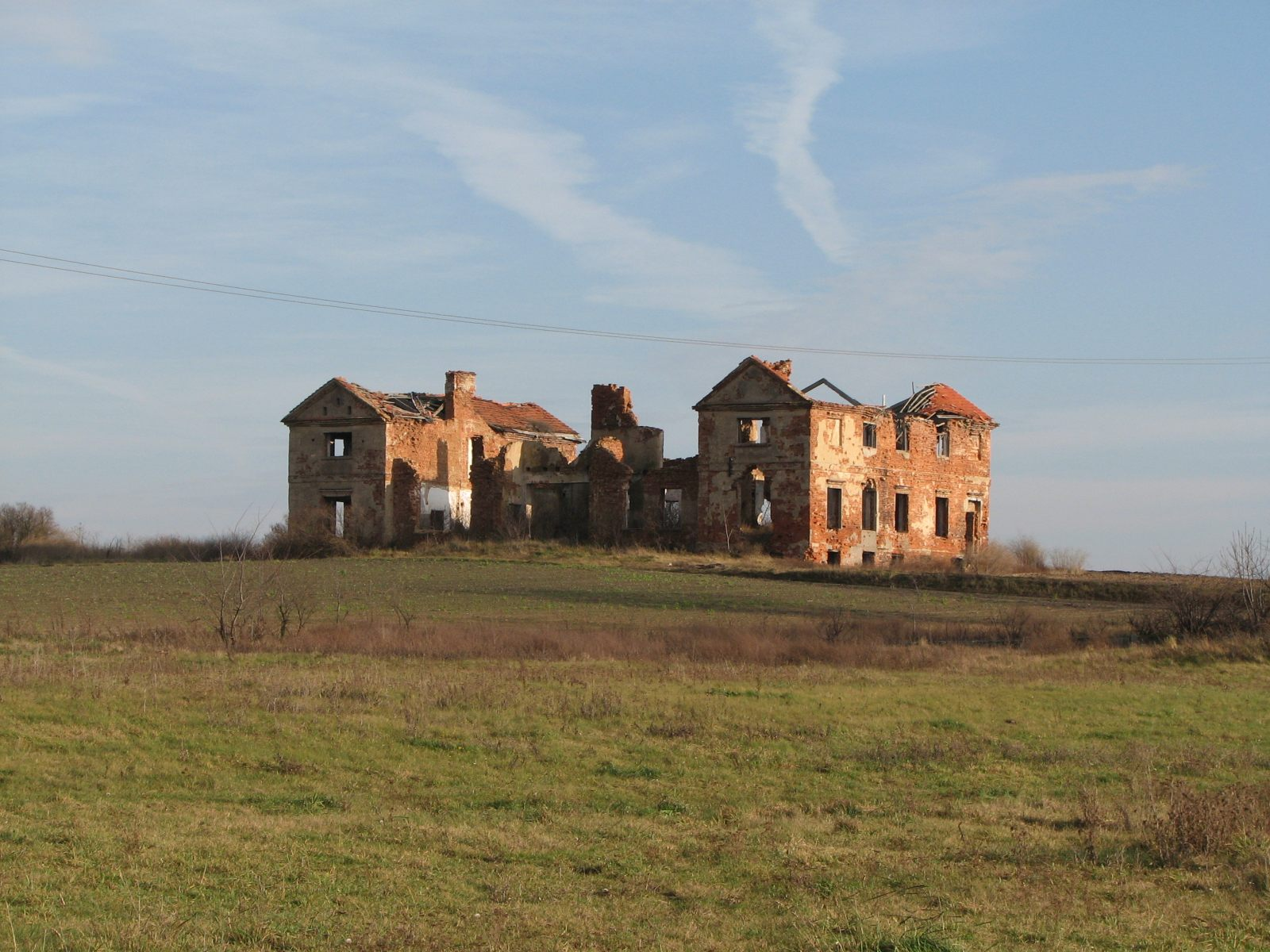
- Manor

- Location within Poland
- Coordinates: 51°43′47″N 18°30′48″E
- Country: Poland
- Voivodeship: Łódź
- County: Sieradz
- Gmina: Warta
- Population: 220

Krąków [ˈkrɔŋkuf] is a village in the administrative district of Gmina Warta, within Sieradz County, Łódź Voivodeship, in central Poland.
