= Krakau, Saxony =

Coordinates: 51.313017°N 13.855433°E

Krakau (German) or Krakow (Sorbian) was a small town in what is now the district of Bautzen in Saxony, Germany. It was located within the Sorbian area, where many inhabitants traditionally speak the West Slavic Sorbian language, and it shared its name with the much larger Polish city. The town was entirely vacated in 1938 when the area became a military training area. After the war, the town was briefly repopulated, before the Soviet occupation troops again evicted the inhabitants to resume use of the area for military purposes. The town was destroyed.

Krakau had 380 inhabitants as of 1834, 430 as of 1890 and 478 as of 1938. A memorial plaque commemorates the town.
