= Łabędzie, Łódź Voivodeship =

Łabędzie
- Village
- Location within Poland
- Coordinates: 51°40′30″N 18°35′22″E
- Country: Poland
- Voivodeship: Łódź
- County: Sieradz
- Gmina: Warta
- Population: 107

Łabędzie [waˈbɛnd͡ʑɛ] is a village in the administrative district of Gmina Warta, within Sieradz County, Łódź Voivodeship, in central Poland.
