= Dimitrie Osmanli =

Macedonian film, television, and theater director

Dimitrie Ruli Osmanli (1927–2006) was a Yugoslav and Macedonian film, television, and theater director. Osmanli was a multimedia director. Highly respected for introducing modern themes and genres in the age of socialist and patriotic realism, introducing the new creative approach with his first feature films, the short film "Puppets` Rebellion" (1957), and especially with the modern comedy "Peaceful Summer" (1961), a film keeping its charm and freshness up to date. One of the founders, the first dean, and a professor in the Faculty of Dramatic Arts ("Fakultet na dramski umetnosti") of the St.st. Cyrillus and Methodius University of Skopje. Dimitrie Osmanli was given a Macedonian Ministry of Culture award for his doyen contributions to the country's film industry. He was born in Bitola and lived in Skopje, and working in his country and abroad.

== Early life and education ==
Osmanli was an ethnic Aromanian. Osmanli graduated (March 12, 1952) in film and theater directing, from the Yugoslav, Belgrade-based High Academic Film School ("Visoka filmska škola") and the Academy Of Theater Art ("Akademija pozorišne umetnosti"). Dramatic Arts’ Academy, and attended postgraduate studies at IDHEC (Institut des Hautes Etudes Cinematographiques), Paris and in Cinecitta in Rome, both in the early 1960s.

== Career ==
=== Academic work ===
Osmanli was a professor of Film History and Acting in front of the camera and microphone. One of the initial professors of the Faculty of Dramatic Arts in St. Cyrilus and Methodius University in Skopje, its first Pro-dean in the founding period while primarily established as a part of the Faculty of Musical Ars, being elected the first Dean of the independent academic institution. He was the unique national multimedia director directing feature productions in theater, film, TV, and the radio.

=== Film, television and radio ===
He directed the short feature film Doll's Rebellion in 1957 in the poetic realism stile. His work includes four long length features; he first directed A Quiet Summer in 1961. Later, he directed Memento, 1967, Thirst, 1971 and Angels of the Dumps, (People of the In-between), 1995.

Osmanli created 11 documentary films, 14 television features, TV series, film reports, and a number of television productions, directed for studios in his country and abroad. He directed the TV play The Paradox of Diogenes for the Polish TV Katovicze, and the long-length feature The White Shirt, the TV play The Lost Son and the seven-episode TV series Morava '76; the latter three projects were for the Belgrade TV studio.

Osmanli's works have been given awards at both film and TV festivals. In 1987 at the Yugoslav TV festival held in Neum, he was bestowed with the special award for directing the TV film Skopje Reveries. In June 1998 the American Film Institute (AFI) presented his film Angels of the Dumps at the National Film Theater in the Kennedy Center, Washington, D.C., honoring him with a special two-day program named "Macedonian director Dimitrie Osmanli in person." The feature film Memento (1967) is re-discovered being widely shown under the European program A Season Of Classic Films in a number of European film centers and in an ex-Yugoslav film selection in the Museum of Modern Art (MoMA) in New York.

He has directed more than fifteen radio dramas by Macedonian, Yugoslav, Russian, and French authors.

=== Theatre ===
Osmanli directed the staging of about seventy theater plays from a number of periods and genres, including Ana Frank in 1957, as well as the first plays by Plaut, Lope de Vega, Marivaux, the Croat classic Miroslav Krleza, etc., on the national theater stage. In the mid-1970s, he performed the tragic farce entitled Both, Pain and Wrath, his own dramatization of the war theme novel by the Macedonian writer S. Janevski.

Osmanli staged a number of comedic plays, which have had runs of at least 50 performances, often over 100 showings; The Wedding Ceremony was presented more than 250 times, and the French vaudeville Flea in the Ear was performed regularly for 18 years. His comedy Member of the Parliament by the Serbian classical playwright Branislav Nushich played for 15 seasons on the stage of the National Theatre in Skopje.

Osmanli was involved with the Edessian Theater in Edessa, Greece, for more than twenty years. In the 1970s, he directed Woody Allen's satirical play God (Horis Ftera), Maria Baka-Stavrakou's The Holidays of Smiley (Oi Diakopes tou Gelastou), Nikolai Gogol's Wedding (Pantrologimata), and in 1999, Pirandello's Six Characters Searching the Author (Exi Prosopa Psahnoun Siggrafea). God, staged with the Edessian Theater, won first prize at the National Festival of Alternative Theaters in Corinthos, Greece.
