= Kawęczynek, Łódź Voivodeship =

Kawęczynek
- Village
- Location within Poland
- Coordinates: 51°39′54″N 18°32′45″E
- Country: Poland
- Voivodeship: Łódź
- County: Sieradz
- Gmina: Warta

Kawęczynek [kavɛnˈt͡ʂɨnɛk] is a village in the administrative district of Gmina Warta, within Sieradz County, Łódź Voivodeship, in central Poland.
