= Tomisławice, Łódź Voivodeship =

Tomisławice
- Village
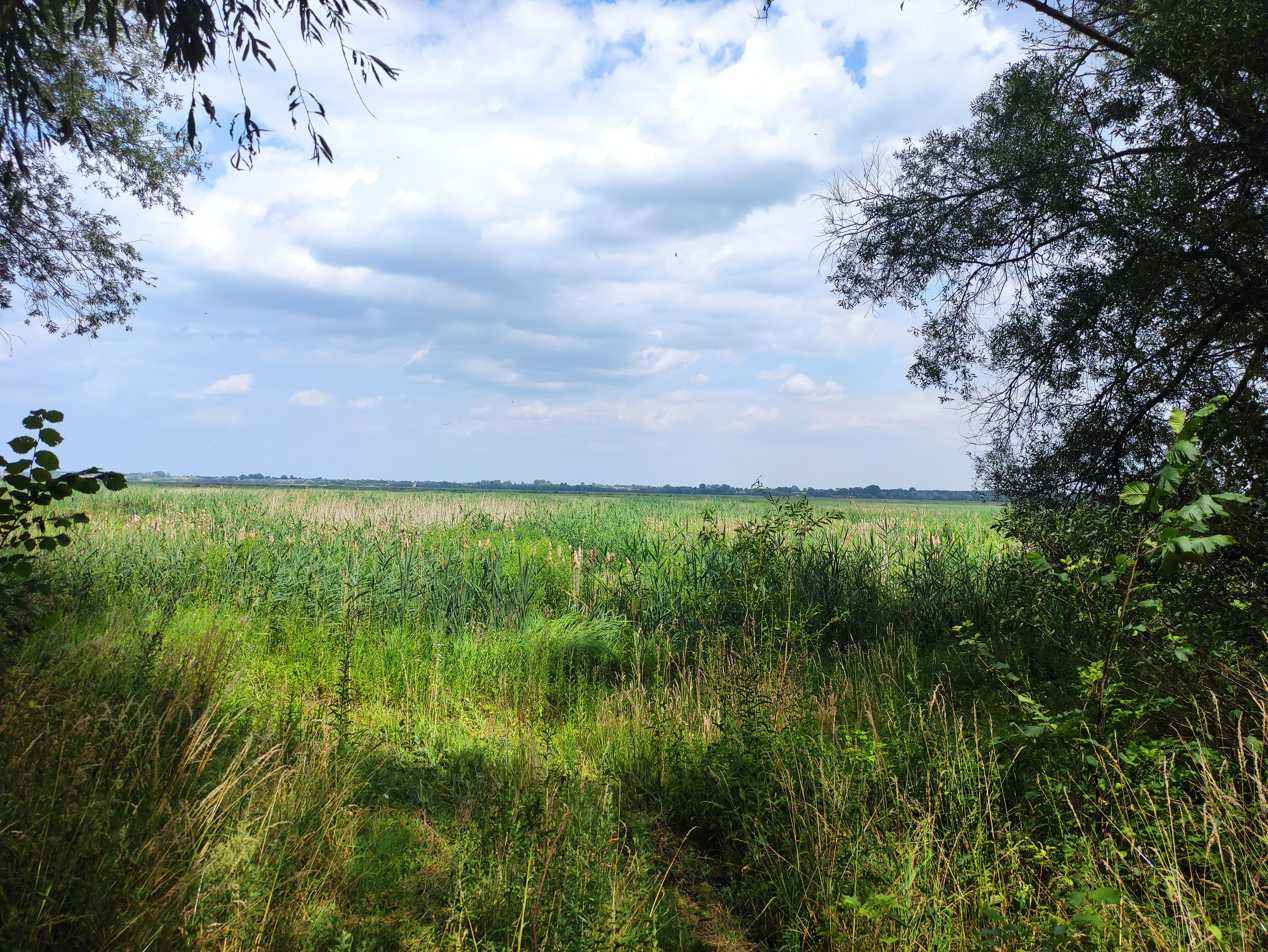

- Location within Poland
- Coordinates: 51°44′59″N 18°38′6″E
- Country: Poland
- Voivodeship: Łódź
- County: Sieradz
- Gmina: Warta

Tomisławice [tɔmiswaˈvit͡sɛ] is a village in the administrative district of Gmina Warta, within Sieradz County, Łódź Voivodeship, in central Poland.
