= Tomislav Osmanli =

Macedonian author, screenwriter and journalist

- Томислав Османли
- Born: 25 October 1956 (age 69); Bitola, SR Macedonia, SFR Yugoslavia (now North Macedonia)
- Education: Ss. Cyril and Methodius University of Skopje
- Occupations: author, playwright, screenwriter, journalist
- Spouse: Snežana Stanković (m. 2013, died)
- Children: 2
- Relatives: Dimitrie Osmanli (father)
- Writing career
- Language: Macedonian
- Period: 1974 – present
- Notable works: Film and Politics, Comics: Scripture of the Human Image

Tomislav Osmanli (Macedonian Cyrillic: Томислав Османли, Macedonian pronunciation: [tǒmislaʋ osˈmanɫɯ ]; born 25 October 1956) is a Macedonian author, screenwriter, playwright, and journalist.

== Biography ==
Osmanli was born in Bitola, People's Republic of Macedonia, at that time a constituent republic of Yugoslavia. His father Dimitrie Osmanli was an acclaimed Macedonian film, theater director and author, whilst his mother was of Greek heritage from Thessaloniki. Osmanli was raised to speak both Macedonian and Greek languages, and was taught Aromanian by his paternal uncle.

The family moved to Skopje when he was two years old. Osmanli studied law at the Saints Cyril and Methodius University, Skopje.

In 1981 Osmanli published his seminal work Филмот и политичкото (English: Film and Politics) a theoretical study of political cinema. In 1987 Osmanli released Стрип: Запис со човечки лик (English: Comics: Scripture of the Human Image), the first scholarly work dedicated to Comics studies published in Yugoslavia.

Osmanli served as an independent editor and member of the editing board of his nation's oldest daily newspaper Nova Makedonija from 1991 to 1998, and as chief of arts and cultural programs at Telma TV between 1998 and 2016.

== Personal life ==
Osmanli was married to Snežana Osmanli (née Stanković), director of the Macedonian Green Card Bureau, founder and first CEO of the insurance company Eurolink, a vice-president of the Skopje-based think-tank group Council on Foreign Relations, and before these activities, being an adviser to former Macedonian President Kiro Gligorov. She and her husband have two children. Snežana Osmanli died of cancer in 2013.

== Publications and other works ==
- Луѓе без адреси (People Without an Address), screenplay (1976)
- Филмот и политичкото (Film and Politics), Seventh Art's aesthetic and media theory (1981)
- Ѕвездите на '42 (Stars '42), screenplay author of the television feature film (1984)
- Salon Bums, satirical theater comedy (1986)
- Скопски сновиденија (Skopje Dreamaries), screenplay author of the television feature film (1987)
- Стрип: Запис со човечки лик (Comics: Scripture of the Human Image), Ninth Art's aesthetic and media theory (1987)
- Скопски диптих (Skopjan Diptych), book of two author's feature film screenplays (1991)
- Медиумот што недостасува (The Missing Medium), book of urban essays (1992)
- Победа над себе (Victory over Oneself), inter-ethnic campaign screenplay (1992)
- Ослушнувања во глуво доба (Listenings to a Deaf Age), book of political essays (1993)
- Мементо за еден град (Memento for a City), multimedia stage project (1993)
- Немирни сенки (Restless Shadows), film cabaret play (1993)
- Пеперутката на детството (The Butterfly of the Childhood), stories (1993)
- Ангели во отпад (Angels of the Dumps), feature movie screenplay author (1994)
- Двајца во Еден (Two in Eden), theater play (1995)
- Светулки во ноќта (Fireflies in a Night), theater play (1997)
- Новиот цар (The New King), theater play (1998)
- Смок лета на небото (Snakeguy Flies in the Skies), TV feature film screenplay (1999)
- Апокалиптична комедија (Apocalyptic Comedy), theater play (1999)
- Звездите над Скопје (Stars over Skopje), book of plays (2000)
- Техно ѕвезда (Techno Star), theater play (2000)
- Виолетни светлини и сенки (Purple Lights and Shadows), short stories collection (2001)
- Пат до Парамарибо (Road to Paramaribo), published bilingually, both in Macedonian and English, a theater play (2001)
- Игри низ жанровите (Games across Genres), book of plays (2003)
- Αρμονικη στηλη (Majestic, original title: Apocalyptic Comedy), a theater play, published in Greece (2004)
- Приказни од Скопје (Tales from Skopje), book of stories (2004)
- Луѓе од меѓувреме (Characters from a Meantime), three differen-genere author's screenplays (2008)
- Светилка за Ханука(Lamp for Hanukkah), published bilingually, both in Macedonian and English (2008)
- Каприча (Capriccios), book of stories (2009)
- Дваесет и првиот (Twenty-first), novel (2009)
- Грађански простор (Civic Space), study over the salons and the space of civic (2011)
- Зад аголот (Around the Corner), novel (2012)
- Бродот. Конзархија (Ship. Conarchy), novel (2016)
- Пруга за ледната пролет (Tracks to an Icy Spring), Holocaust theater stage project (2017)
- Океан од слики (Ocean of Images), book of stories (2018)
- Нишала од злато, (Pendulums of Gold), theater play (2018)
- Тајното братство на носталгичарите) (The Secret Nostalgics' Brotherhood), short story (2019)
- Скопски драми 1&2 (Skopje Dramas, volumes 1&2), theater plays (2019)
- Нови драми (New Plays), book of plays (2019)
- ПараδΩξicoN/Парадоксикон (Paradoxicon), book of stories and novellas (2020)
- Бдеења Блажеви - Пеења до потомците, (Blaže's Singing - Singings to the Posterity), a thousand-versed poem honoring the poet and linguist Blazhe Koneski (2021)
- Средби и разговори - со доајените на нашата уметност, (Meetings and Conversations with the Doyens of Our Art), six huge interviews (2021)
- Деветта уметност - антропоморфизмот на стрипот, (The Ninth Art - On the Anthropomorphism of the Comics), Ninth Art's aesthetic and media theory (2021)
- Столб што пее, (Singing Pillar), novel (2022)
- Пут у рај, (Road to Paradise), drama, three theater plays, published in Serbia (2023)
- Заборав (Oblivion), novel (2023)
- Αρμονικη στηλη (Singing Pillar), novel, published in Greece (2024)
- Стуб који пева (Singing Pillar), novel, published in Serbia (2025)
