= Tomislav Ljubenović =

Serbian politician (born 1951)

Tomislav Ljubenović (Serbian Cyrillic: Томислав Љубеновић; born May 2, 1951) is a politician in Serbia. He is a member of the far-right Serbian Radical Party and is currently serving his fourth term in the National Assembly of Serbia. He previously served in the Assembly of Serbia and Montenegro from 2004 to 2006.

== Private life ==
Ljubenović was born in Leskovac, in what was then the People's Republic of Serbia in the Federal People's Republic of Yugoslavia. He is a professor of metallurgy.

== Political career ==
=== Early candidacies (federal and republic levels) ===
Ljubenović received the second position on the Radical Party's electoral list for the Leskovac division in the 1997 Serbian parliamentary election. The party won three seats in the area, but he was not included in its assembly delegation. (From 1992 to 2000, Serbia's electoral law stipulated that one-third of parliamentary mandates would be assigned to candidates from successful lists in numerical order, while the remaining two-thirds would be distributed amongst other candidates on the lists by the sponsoring parties. It was common practice for the latter mandates to be awarded out of numerical order, and Ljubenović's position on the list did not give him the automatic right to a seat in the assembly.)

He sought election to the Parliament of Yugoslavia's Chamber of Citizens in the 2000 Yugoslavian general election, leading the Radical Party's list in Leskovac. The party did not win any seats in the division.

Serbia's electoral system was reformed in 2000, with the entire country becoming a single electoral division with members chosen by proportional representation. Ljubenović received the sixtieth position on the Radical Party's list; the party won twenty-three seats, and he was not selected to serve in the new parliament. (From 2000 to 2011, parliamentary mandates were awarded to sponsoring parties or coalitions rather than to individual candidates, and it was common practice for mandates to be awarded out of numerical order. Ljubenović could have been awarded a mandate despite his relatively low position, but he was not.)

=== National and Federal representative ===
Ljubenović received the forty-sixth position on the Radical Party's list for the 2003 parliamentary election. The party won eighty-two seats, emerging as the largest party in the assembly but still falling well short of a majority; it served in opposition in the parliament that followed. Ljubenović was on this occasion selected for an assembly mandate and took his seat when parliament met on January 27, 2004.

His first term in the National Assembly proved brief. By virtue of its performance in the election, the Radical Party won the right to nominate thirty members to the federal Assembly of Serbia and Montenegro. Ljubenović was selected as part of his party's delegation to this body on February 12, 2004, and so resigned his seat in the Serbian assembly. He served in the federal assembly for two years; it ceased to exist in 2006, when Montenegro declared independence.

=== Member of the National Assembly ===
Ljubenović was included on the Radical Party's electoral list for the 2007 Serbian parliamentary election. The party won eighty-one seats, remaining the largest single party in the assembly but also remaining in opposition. Ljubenović was again chosen to serve in the party's assembly delegation. He was later returned to a third term following the 2008 election and served in opposition to Mirko Cvetković's government over the next four years.

The Radical Party experienced a serious internal division in late 2008, with several leading members joining the breakaway Serbian Progressive Party under the leadership of Tomislav Nikolić and Aleksandar Vučić. Ljubenović remained with the Radicals.

Serbia's electoral system was again reformed in 2011, such that parliamentary mandates were awarded in numerical order to candidates on successful lists. Ljubenović was given the sixteenth position on the Radical Party's list for the 2012 Serbian parliamentary election. The party did not, on this occasion, cross the electoral threshold to win representation in the assembly. He was promoted to the tenth position in the 2014 election, in which the party again failed to win any seats.

The Radicals returned to parliament with the 2016 election, winning twenty-two mandates. Ljubenović, who received the eleventh position on the party's list, was accordingly re-elected. He currently serves on the parliamentary committee on the economy, regional development, trade, tourism, and energy; is a deputy member of the agriculture, forestry, and water management committee; and is a member of the parliamentary friendship groups with Belarus, Kazakhstan, Russia, and Slovakia.

=== Municipal politics ===
In addition to serving in the National Assembly, Ljubenović is also the leader of the Radical Party group in the Leskovac municipal assembly, of which he is a long-serving member. In 2011, it was reported that he faced misdemeanour charges after punching a fellow councillor who had resigned from the Radical Party.
