= Dušníky =

- Municipality
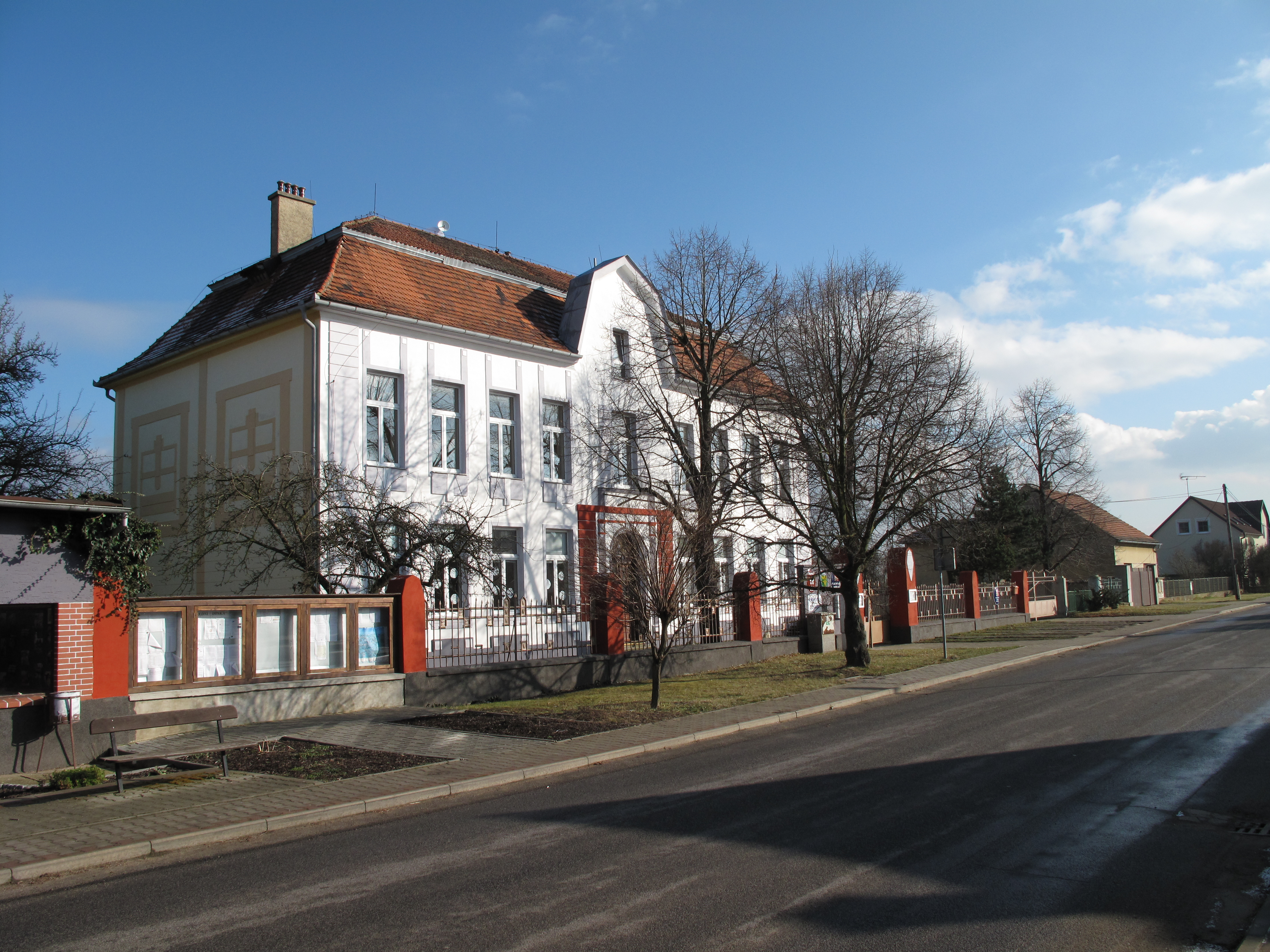
- Municipal office

- Flag Coat of arms

- Location in the Czech Republic
- Coordinates: 50°25′29″N 14°11′25″E
- Country: Czech Republic
- Region: Ústí nad Labem
- District: Litoměřice
- First mentioned: 1226

Area
  - Total: 4.28 km^{2} (1.65 sq mi)
- Elevation: 203 m (666 ft)

Population (2026-01-01)
  - Total: 439
  - Density: 103/km^{2} (266/sq mi)
- Time zone: UTC+1 (CET)
  - Summer (DST): UTC+2 (CEST)
- Postal code: 413 01
- Website: www.dusniky.cz

Dušníky (German: Duschnik) is a municipality and village in Litoměřice District in the Ústí nad Labem Region of the Czech Republic. It has about 400 inhabitants.

== Demographics ==
Historical population
Year	Pop.	±%
1869	298	—
1880	331	+11.1%
1890	335	+1.2%
1900	350	+4.5%
1910	358	+2.3%
1921	403	+12.6%
1930	385	−4.5%
1950	315	−18.2%
1961	315	+0.0%
1970	264	−16.2%
1980	271	+2.7%
1991	268	−1.1%
2001	293	+9.3%
2011	388	+32.4%
2021	412	+6.2%
Source: Censuses
